= List of Mesozoic birds =

This list of Mesozoic birds is a comprehensive list of all Mesozoic dinosaurs that have been assigned to the clade Avialae (birds, in the broadest sense). The list includes all commonly accepted genera, but also genera that are now considered invalid, doubtful (nomen dubium), or were not formally published (nomen nudum), as well as junior synonyms of more established names, and genera that are no longer considered avialan. The list currently includes 299 genera.

== Scope and terminology ==
There is no official, canonical list of Mesozoic bird genera, but some of the more complete ones include Holtz's list of Mesozoic dinosaurs, Molina-Perez & Larramendi's list of theropods, and Mickey Mortimer's Theropod Database. Lists of ex-birds are generally rare, but one example is the "Ex-Saurischian Taxa and Basal Saurischians" section of the Theropod Database.

=== Authors and year ===
The authors column lists the authors of the formal description responsible for the erection of the genus listed. They are not necessarily the same as the authors of the type species, as sometimes a species from one genus is determined sufficiently distinct to warrant the erection of a new genus to house it. If this is the case, only the latter authors will be listed. The year column notes the year the genus' description was published.

=== Status ===
Naming conventions and terminology follow the International Code of Zoological Nomenclature (ICZN). Technical terms used include:

- Junior synonym: A name which describes the same taxon as a previously published name. If two or more genera are formally designated and the type specimens are later assigned to the same genus, the first to be published (in chronological order) is the senior synonym, and all other instances are junior synonyms. Senior synonyms are generally used, except by special decision of the ICZN, but junior synonyms cannot be used again, even if deprecated. Junior synonymy is often subjective, unless the genera described were both based on the same type specimen.
- Nomen nudum (Latin for "naked name"): A name that has appeared in print but has not yet been formally published by the standards of the ICZN. Nomina nuda (the plural form) are invalid, and are therefore not italicized as a proper generic name would be. If the name is later formally published, that name is no longer a nomen nudum and will be italicized on this list. Often, the formally published name will differ from any nomina nuda that describe the same specimen.
- Preoccupied name: A name that is formally published, but which has already been used for another taxon. This second use is invalid (as are all subsequent uses) and the name must be replaced.
- Nomen dubium (Latin for "dubious name"): A name describing a fossil with no unique diagnostic features. As this can be an extremely subjective and controversial designation, this term is not used on this list.

=== Age ===
The age column denotes the epoch of geologic time to which the fossils date. Genera that are invalid, misidentified, or otherwise do not represent a valid Mesozoic bird are listed as age N/A because there was never a time in which a Mesozoic bird by that generic name actually lived.

=== Location and notes ===
The location column designates the geographic region where remains of the relevant genus have been found. The regions used are countries, despite the fact that there were no political boundaries in Mesozoic times; they are only used for convenience. Genera that are invalid, misidentified, or otherwise do not represent a valid Mesozoic bird are listed as location N/A because there was never a place in which a Mesozoic bird by that generic name actually lived. The notes column is a collection of annotations on the scientific significance and taxonomic history of listed genera, as well as elaborations on the information presented in other columns.

== List ==
Genus	Authors	Year	Status	Age	Location	Notes	Images
Abavornis	Panteleyev	1998	Valid	Late Cretaceous	Uzbekistan		
Aberratiodontus	Gong et al.	2004	Junior synonym	Early Cretaceous	China	Junior synonym of Yanornis.	
Abitusavis	Wang et al.	2020	Valid	Early Cretaceous	China		
Alamitornis	Agonlin & Martinelli	2009	Valid	Late Cretaceous	Argentina		
Alcmonavis	Rauhut et al.	2019	Valid	Late Jurassic	Germany		
Alethoalaornis	Li et al.	2007	Valid	Early Cretaceous	China		
Alexornis	Brodkorb	1976	Valid	Late Cretaceous	Mexico		
Ambiortus	Kurochkin	1982	Valid	Early Cretaceous	Mongolia		
Ambopteryx	Wang et al.	2019	Valid	Late Jurassic	China	Considered a non-avialan theropod by some researchers.	
Anatalavis	Olson & Parris	1987	Valid	Late Cretaceous	United States; England	The type species is known from the Late Cretaceous–Paleocene border, while a referred species is from the Eocene.	
Anchiornis	Xu et al.	2009	Valid	Late Jurassic	China	Considered a non-avialan theropod by some researchers.	
Angelinornis	Kashin	1972	Junior synonym	Late Cretaceous	United States	Junior synonym of Ichthyornis.	
Antarcticavis	Cordes-Person et al.	2020	Valid	Late Cretaceous	Antarctica		
Apatornis	Marsh	1873	Valid	Late Cretaceous	United States		
Apsaravis	Norell & Clarke	2001	Valid	Late Cretaceous	Mongolia		
Archaeopteryx	Meyer	1861	Valid	Late Jurassic	Germany	Considered a non-avialan theropod by some researchers.	
Archaeorhynchus	Zhou & Zhang	2006	Valid	Early Cretaceous	China		
Archaeornis	Petronievics	1917	Junior synonym	Late Jurassic	Germany	Junior synonym of Archaeopteryx.	
Archaeornithura	Wang et al.	2015	Valid	Early Cretaceous	China		
Archaeovolans	Czerkas & Xu	2002	Junior synonym	Early Cretaceous	China	Junior synonym of Yanornis.	
Asiahesperornis	Nesov & Prizemlin	1991	Valid	Late Cretaceous	Kazakhstan		
Asteriornis	Field et al.	2020	Valid	Late Cretaceous	Belgium		
Aurornis	Godefroit et al.	2013	Valid	Late Jurassic	China	Considered a non-avialan theropod by some researchers.	
Austinornis	Clarke	2004	Valid	Late Cretaceous	United States		
Avimaia	Bailleul et al.	2019	Valid	Early Cretaceous	China		
Avisaurus	Brett-Surman & Paul	1985	Valid	Late Cretaceous	United States		
Balaur	Csiki et al.	2010	Valid	Late Cretaceous	Romania	Originally (and sometimes still) thought to be a non-avialan theropod.	
Baminornis	Chen et al.	2025	Valid	Early Cretaceous	China		
Baptornis	Marsh	1877	Valid	Late Cretaceous	United States		
Bauxitornis	Dyke & Ősi	2010	Valid	Late Cretaceous	Hungary		
Beiguornis	Wang et al.	2022	Valid	Early Cretaceous	China		
Bellulia	Wang et al.	2016a	Preoccupied	N/A	N/A	Name preoccupied by the moth Bellulia Fibiger 2008 and replaced by Bellulornis.	
Bellulornis	Wang et al.	2016b	Valid	Early Cretaceous	China		
Bohaiornis	Hu et al.	2011	Valid	Early Cretaceous	China		
Boluochia	Zhou	1995	Valid	Early Cretaceous	China		
Bradycneme	Harrison & Walker	1975	Misidentification	N/A	N/A	Originally described as a bird; more likely a non-avialan theropod.	
Brevidentavis	O'Connor et al.	2021	Valid	Early Cretaceous	China		
Brevirostruavis	Li et al.	2021	Valid	Early Cretaceous	China		
Brodavis	Martin et al.	2012	Valid	Late Cretaceous	United States; Mongolia		
Caihong	Hu et al.	2018	Valid	Late Jurassic	China	Considered to be a non-avialan theropod by some researchers.	
Camptodontornis	Demirjian	2019	Valid	Early Cretaceous	China		
Camptodontus	Li et al.	2010	Preoccupied	N/A	N/A	Name preoccupied by the beetle Camptodontus Dejean, 1826 and replaced by Camptodontornis.	
Canadaga	Hou	1999	Valid	Late Cretaceous	Canada		
Castignovolucris	Buffetaut et al.	2023	Valid	Late Cretaceous	France		
Catenoleimus	Panteleyev	1998	Valid	Late Cretaceous	Uzbekistan		
Cathayornis	Zhou et al.	1992	Valid	Early Cretaceous	China		
Ceramornis	Brodkorb	1963	Valid	Late Cretaceous	United States		
Cerebavis	Kurochkin et al.	2006	Valid	Late Cretaceous	Russia		
Changchengornis	Ji et al.	1999	Valid	Early Cretaceous	China		
Changmaornis	Wang et al.	2013	Valid	Early Cretaceous	China		
Changzuiornis	Huang et al.	2016	Disputed	Early Cretaceous	China	Possibly synonymous with Juehuaornis.	
Chaoyangia	Hou & Zhang	1993	Valid	Early Cretaceous	China		
Chiappeavis	O'Connor et al.	2016	Valid	Early Cretaceous	China		
Chongmingia	Wang et al.	2016	Valid	Early Cretaceous	China		
Chromeornis	O'Connor et al.	2025	Valid	Early Cretaceous	China		
Chupkaornis	Tanaka et al.	2017	Valid	Late Cretaceous	Japan		
Cimoliornis	Owen	1846	Misidentification	N/A	N/A	Originally described as a bird; actually a pterosaur.	
Cimolopteryx	Marsh	1892	Valid	Late Cretaceous	United States	May be Paleocene.	
Colonosaurus	Marsh	1872	Junior synonym	Late Cretaceous	United States	Junior synonym of Ichthyornis.	
Concornis	Sanz & Buscalioni	1992	Valid	Early Cretaceous	Spain		
Confuciusornis	Hou et al.	1995	Valid	Early Cretaceous	China		
Coniornis	Marsh	1893	Junior synonym	Late Cretaceous	United States	Junior synonym of Hesperornis.	
Cosesaurus	Ellenberger & de Villalta	1974	Misidentification	N/A	N/A	Sometimes proposed to be a bird ancestor; actually a tanystropheid.	
Cratoavis	Carvalho et al.	2015	Valid	Early Cretaceous	Brazil		
Cratonavis	Li et al.	2023	Valid	Early Cretaceous	China		
Cretaaviculus	Bazhanov	1969	Valid	Late Cretaceous	Kazakhstan		
Cretornis	Fritsch	1880	Misidentification	N/A	N/A	Originally described as a bird; actually a pterosaur.	
Cruralispennia	Wang et al.	2017	Valid	Early Cretaceous	China		
Cuspirostrisornis	Hou	1997	Valid	Early Cretaceous	China		
Dalianraptor	Gao & Liu	2005	Disputed	N/A	N/A	Likely a chimaera consisting of a Jeholornis and another theropod.	
Dalingheornis	Zhang et al.	2006	Valid	Early Cretaceous	China		
Dapingfangornis	Li et al.	2006	Valid	Early Cretaceous	China		
Didactylornis	Yuan	2008	Junior synonym	Early Cretaceous	China	Junior synonym of Sapeornis.	
Dingavis	O'Connor et al.	2016	Disputed	Early Cretaceous	China	Possibly synonymous with Changzuiornis and/or Juehuaornis.	
Dunhuangia	Wang et al.	2015	Valid	Early Cretaceous	China		
Elbretornis	Walker & Dyke	2009	Valid	Late Cretaceous	Argentina	Possibly synonymous with Lectavis, Soroavisaurus and/or Yungavolucris.	
Elektorornis	Xing et al.	2019	Valid	Early Cretaceous	Myanmar		
Elopteryx	Andrews	1913	Misidentification	N/A	N/A	Originally described as a bird; more likely to be a non-avialan theropod.	
Elsornis	Chiappe et al.	2007	Valid	Late Cretaceous	Mongolia		
Enaliornis	Seeley	1876	Valid	Late Cretaceous	England		
Enantiophoenix	Cau & Arduini	2008	Valid	Late Cretaceous	Lebanon		
Enantiornis	Walker	1981	Valid	Late Cretaceous	Argentina		
Eoalulavis	Sanz et al.	1996	Valid	Early Cretaceous	Spain		
Eocathayornis	Zhou	2002	Valid	Early Cretaceous	China		
Eoconfuciusornis	Zhang et al.	2008	Valid	Early Cretaceous	China		
Eoenantiornis	Hou et al.	1999	Valid	Early Cretaceous	China		
Eogranivora	Zheng et al.	2018	Valid	Early Cretaceous	China		
Eopengornis	Wang et al.	2014	Valid	Early Cretaceous	China		
Eosinopteryx	Godefroit et al.	2013	Valid	Late Jurassic	China	Considered a non-avialan theropod by some researchers.	
Epidendrosaurus	Zhang et al.	2002	Junior synonym	Late Jurassic	China	Possible synonym of Scansoriopteryx.	
Epidexipteryx	Zhang et al.	2008	Valid	Late Jurassic	China	Considered a non-avialan theropod by some researchers.	
Eurolimnornis	Kessler & Jurcsák	1986	Misidentification	N/A	N/A	Originally described as a bird; reinterpreted as a pterodactyloid pterosaur.	
Evgenavis	O'Connor et al.	2014	Valid	Early Cretaceous	Russia		
Explorornis	Panteleyev	1998	Valid	Late Cretaceous	Uzbekistan		
Falcatakely	O'Connor et al.	2020	Valid	Late Cretaceous	Madagascar		
Feitianius	O'Connor et al.	2015	Valid	Early Cretaceous	China		
Flexomornis	Tykoski & Fiorillo	2010	Valid	Late Cretaceous	United States		
Fortipesavis	Clark & O'Connor	2021	Valid	Early Cretaceous	Myanmar		
Fortunguavis	Wang et al.	2014	Valid	Early Cretaceous	China		
Fujianvenator	Xu et al.	2023	Valid	Late Jurassic	China	Found within the family Anchiornithidae, which may represent non-avialan dinosaurs	
Fukuipteryx	Imai et al.	2019	Valid	Early Cretaceous	Japan		
Fumicollis	Bell & Chiappe	2015	Valid	Late Cretaceous	United States		
Gallornis	Lambrecht	1931	Valid	Early Cretaceous	France		
Gansus	Hou & Liu	1984	Valid	Early Cretaceous	China		
Gargantuavis	Buffetaut & Le Loeuff	1998	Valid	Late Cretaceous	France; Spain; Romania		
Gettyia	Atterholt et al.	2018	Valid	Late Cretaceous	United States		
Gobipipus	Kurochkin & Chatterjee	2013	Valid	Early Cretaceous	Mongolia	Very similar to embryonic Gobipteryx.	
Gobipteryx	Elżanowski	1994	Valid	Late Cretaceous	Mongolia		
Gorgonavis	Nebreda et al.	2026	Valid	Early Cretaceous	Spain		
Grabauornis	Dalsätt et al.	2014	Valid	Early Cretaceous	China		
Gracilornis	Li & Hou	2011	Valid	Early Cretaceous	China		
Graculavus	Marsh	1872	Valid	Late Cretaceous	United States	May be Paleocene.	
Gretcheniao	Chiappe et al.	2019	Valid	Early Cretaceous	China		
Griphornis	Woodward	1862	Junior synonym	Late Jurassic	Germany	Name officially rejected in favor of Archaeopteryx.	
Griphosaurus	Wagner	1862	Junior synonym	Late Jurassic	Germany	Name officially rejected in favor of Archaeopteryx.	
Guildavis	Clarke	2004	Valid	Late Cretaceous	United States		
Gurilynia	Kurochkin	1999	Valid	Late Cretaceous	Mongolia		
Halimornis	Chiappe	2002	Valid	Late Cretaceous	United States		
Hargeria	Lucas	1903	Junior synonym	Late Cretaceous	United States	Junior synonym of Hesperornis.	
"Hebeiornis"	Xu et al.	1999	Nomen nudum	N/A	N/A	Synonym of Vescornis due to being based on the same holotype. However, despite predating the description of Vescornis by five years, its description is so poor that it is regarded as a nomen nudum and a synonym.	
Heptasteornis	Harrison & Walker	1975	Misidentification	N/A	N/A	Originally described as a bird; more likely a non-avialan theropod.	
Hesperornis	Marsh	1872	Valid	Late Cretaceous	United States; Canada; Russia		
Holbotia	Zelenkov & Averianov	2015	Valid	Early Cretaceous	Mongolia		
Hollanda	Bell et al.	2010	Valid	Late Cretaceous	Mongolia		
Hongshanornis	Zhou & Zhang	2005	Valid	Early Cretaceous	China		
Horezmavis	Nessov & Borkin	1983	Valid	Late Cretaceous	Uzbekistan		
Houornis	Wang & Liu	2015	Valid	Early Cretaceous	China		
Huoshanornis	Wang et al.	2010	Valid	Early Cretaceous	China		
Iaceornis	Clarke	2004	Valid	Late Cretaceous	United States		
Iberomesornis	Sanz & Bonaparte	1992	Valid	Early Cretaceous	Spain		
Ichthyornis	Marsh	1873	Valid	Late Cretaceous	United States		
Ilerdopteryx	Lacasa-Ruiz	1985	Valid	Early Cretaceous	Spain		
Imparavis	Wang et al.	2024	Valid	Early Cretaceous	China		
Incolornis	Panteleyev	1998	Valid	Late Cretaceous	Uzbekistan		
Intiornis	Novas et al.	2010	Valid	Late Cretaceous	Argentina		
Iteravis	Zhou et al.	2014	Valid	Early Cretaceous	China		
Janavis	Benito et al.	2022	Valid	Late Cretaceous	Belgium		
Jeholornis	Zhou et al.	2002	Valid	Early Cretaceous	China		
Jianchangornis	Zhou et al.	2009	Valid	Early Cretaceous	China		
Jibeinia	Hou	1997	Valid	Early Cretaceous	China	Only known specimen missing.	
Jinfengopteryx	Ji et al.	2005	Misidentification	N/A	N/A	Originally described as a bird; actually a non-avian dinosaur.	
Jinguofortis	Wang et al.	2018	Valid	Early Cretaceous	China		
Jinzhouornis	Hou et al.	2002	Junior synonym	Early Cretaceous	China	Junior synonym of Confuciusornis.	
Jiuquanornis	Wang et al.	2013	Valid	Early Cretaceous	China		
Jixiangornis	Ji et al.	2002	Valid	Early Cretaceous	China		
Judinornis	Nessov & Borkin	1983	Valid	Late Cretaceous	Mongolia		
Juehuaornis	Wang et al.	2015	Valid	Early Cretaceous	China		
Junornis	Liu et al.	2017	Valid	Early Cretaceous	China		
Jurapteryx	Howgate	1984	Junior synonym	Late Jurassic	Germany	Junior synonym of Archaeopteryx.	
Kaririavis	Carvalho et al.	2021	Valid	Early Cretaceous	Brazil		
Khinganornis	Wang et al.	2020	Valid	Early Cretaceous	China		
Kizylkumavis	Nessov	1984	Valid	Late Cretaceous	Uzbekistan		
Kompsornis	Wang et al.	2020	Valid	Early Cretaceous	China		
Kookne	Novas et al.	2019	Valid	Late Cretaceous	Argentina		
Kunpengornis	Huang et al.	2025	Valid	Early Cretaceous	China		
Kuszholia	Nesov	1992	Valid	Late Cretaceous	Uzbekistan		
Lamarqueavis	Agnolin	2010	Valid	Late Cretaceous	Argentina; United States; Canada		
Laopteryx	Marsh	1881	Misidentification	N/A	N/A	Originally described as a bird; actually a pterosaur.	
Laornis	Marsh	1870	Valid	Late Cretaceous	United States	May be Paleocene.	
Largirostrornis	Hou	1997	Disputed	Early Cretaceous	China	Possible synonym of Cathayornis.	
Lectavis	Chiappe	1993	Valid	Late Cretaceous	Argentina		
Lenesornis	Kurochkin	1996	Valid	Late Cretaceous	Uzbekistan		
Lestornis	Marsh	1876	Junior synonym	Late Cretaceous	United States	Junior synonym of Hesperornis.	
Liaoningornis	Hou	1996	Valid	Early Cretaceous	China		
Liaoxiornis	Hou & Chen	1999	Valid	Early Cretaceous	China		
Limenavis	Clarke & Chiappe	2001	Valid	Late Cretaceous	Argentina		
Limnornis	Kessler & Jurcsak	1984	Misidentification	N/A	N/A	Name preoccupied by the ovenbird Limnornis Gould 1839 and replaced by Palaeocursornis. Originally described as a bird; actually a pterosaur.	
Lingyuanornis	Ji & Ji	1999	Junior synonym	N/A	N/A	Junior synonym of Liaoxiornis as it is based on the same holotype.	
Linyiornis	Wang et al.	2016	Valid	Early Cretaceous	China		
Lisboasaurus	Seiffert	1970	Misidentification	N/A	N/A	Sometimes proposed to be a bird; actually a crocodilian.	
Lonchodytes	Brodkorb	1963	Valid	Late Cretaceous	United States	May be Paleocene.	
Longchengornis	Hou	1997	Disputed	Early Cretaceous	China	Possible synonym of Cathayornis.	
Longicrusavis	O'Connor et al.	2010	Valid	Early Cretaceous	China		
Longipteryx	Zhang et al.	2001	Valid	Early Cretaceous	China		
Longirostravis	Hou et al.	2004	Valid	Early Cretaceous	China		
Longisquama	Sharov	1970	Misidentification	N/A	N/A	Sometimes proposed to be a bird ancestor; actually an indeterminate reptile.	
Longusunguis	Wang et al.	2014	Valid	Early Cretaceous	China		
Maaqwi	McLachlan et al.	2017	Valid	Late Cretaceous	Canada		
Magnusavis	Clark et al.	2024	Valid	Late Cretaceous	United States		
Martinavis	Walker et al.	2007	Valid	Late Cretaceous	France; Argentina		
Meemannavis	O'Connor et al.	2021	Valid	Early Cretaceous	China		
Megalancosaurus	Calzavara et al.	1980	Misidentification	N/A	N/A	Sometimes proposed to be a bird ancestor, but actually a drepanosaurid.	
Mengciusornis	Wang et al.	2019	Valid	Early Cretaceous	China		
Microenantiornis	Wei & Li	2017	Valid	Early Cretaceous	China		
Mirarce	Atterholt et al.	2018	Valid	Late Cretaceous	United States		
Mirusavis	Wang et al.	2020	Valid	Early Cretaceous	China		
Monoenantiornis	Hu & O'Connor	2016	Valid	Early Cretaceous	China		
Musivavis	Wang et al.	2022	Valid	Early Cretaceous	China		
Mystiornis	Kurochkin et al.	2011	Valid	Early Cretaceous	Russia		
Nanantius	Molnar	1986	Valid	Early Cretaceous	Australia		
Navaornis	Chiappe et al.	2024	Valid	Late Cretaceous	Brazil		
Neimengornis	Wang et al.	2021	Valid	Early Cretaceous	China		
Neobohaiornis	Shen et al.	2024	Valid	Early Cretaceous	China		
Neogaeornis	Lambrecht	1929	Valid	Late Cretaceous	Chile		
Neuquenornis	Chiappe & Calvo	1994	Valid	Late Cretaceous	Argentina		
Noguerornis	Lacasa-Ruiz	1989	Valid	Early Cretaceous	Spain		
Novacaesareala	Parris & Hope	2002	Valid	Late Cretaceous	United States	May be Paleocene.	
Novavis	O'Connor et al.	2025	In press	Early Cretaceous	China		
Oculudentavis	Xing et al.	2020	Misidentification	N/A	N/A	Originally described as a bird; reinterpreted as an indeterminate lizard.	
Omnivoropteryx	Czerkas & Ji	2002	Valid	Early Cretaceous	China		
Orienantius	Liu et al.	2019	Valid	Early Cretaceous	China		
Ostromia	Foth & Rauhut	2017	Valid	Late Jurassic	Germany	Considered a non-avialan theropod by some researchers.	
Otogornis	Hou	1994	Valid	Early Cretaceous	China		
Palaeocursornis	Kessler & Jurcsak	1986	Misidentification	N/A	N/A	Originally described as a bird; actually a pterosaur.	
Palaeonornis	Emmons	1857	Misidentification	N/A	N/A	Originally described as a bird; actually a junior synonym of the phytosaur Rutiodon.	
Palaeopteryx	Jensen	1981	Misidentification	N/A	N/A	Originally described as a bird; more likely a non-avian theropod.	
Palaeornis	Mantell	1844	Misidentification	N/A	N/A	Name preoccupied by the parrot Palaeornis Vigors 1825; name later replaced by Rexarthuria. Originally described as a bird; actually a pterosaur.	
Palaeotringa	Marsh	1870	Valid	Late Cretaceous	United States	May be Paleocene.	
Palintropus	Brodkorb	1970	Valid	Late Cretaceous	United States; Canada		
Parabohaiornis	Wang et al.	2014	Valid	Early Cretaceous	China		
Parahesperornis	Martin	1984	Valid	Late Cretaceous	United States		
Parahongshanornis	Li et al.	2011	Valid	Early Cretaceous	China		
Parapengornis	Hu et al.	2015	Valid	Early Cretaceous	China		
Paraprotopteryx	Zheng et al.	2007	Valid	Early Cretaceous	China		
Parascaniornis	Lambrecht	1933	Junior synonym	Late Cretaceous	Sweden	Junior synonym of Baptornis.	
Parvavis	Wang et al.	2014	Valid	Late Cretaceous	China		
Pasquiaornis	Tokaryk et al.	1997	Valid	Late Cretaceous	Canada		
Patagopteryx	Alvarenga & Bonaparte	1992	Valid	Late Cretaceous	Argentina		
Pedopenna	Xu & Zhang	2005	Valid	Late Jurassic	China	Considered a non-avialan theropod by some researchers.	
Pelagornis	Seeley	1866	Preoccupied	N/A	N/A	Named preoccupied by the Miocene bird Pelagornis Lartet 1857 and replaced by Enaliornis.	
Pengornis	Zhou et al.	2008	Valid	Early Cretaceous	China		
Piksi	Varricchio	2002	Misidentification	N/A	N/A	Originally described as a bird; reinterpreted as a pterodactyloid pterosaur.	
Piscivoravis	Zhou et al.	2013	Valid	Early Cretaceous	China		
Piscivorenantiornis	Wang & Zhou	2017	Valid	Early Cretaceous	China		
Platanavis	Nesov	1992	Valid	Late Cretaceous	Uzbekistan		
Plegadornis	Wetmore	1962	Preoccupied	N/A	N/A	Name preoccupied by the modern bird Plegadornis Brehm 1855; junior synonym of Ichthyornis.	
Plumadraco	Clark et al.	2026	Valid	Early Cretaceous	China		
Polarornis	Chatterjee	2002	Valid	Late Cretaceous	Antarctica		
Potamornis	Elzanowski et al.	2001	Valid	Late Cretaceous	United States		
Praeornis	Rautian	1978	Valid	Late Jurassic	Kazakhstan		
Priscavolucris	Gomez Pallerola	1979	Misidentification	N/A	N/A	Originally described as a bird; reinterpreted as a hybodontiform fish.	
"Proornis"	Lim	1993	Nomen nudum	N/A	N/A		
Protarchaeopteryx	Ji & Ji	1997	Misidentification	N/A	N/A	Originally described as a bird; actually a non-avian dinosaur.	
Protoavis	Chatterjee	1991	Misidentification	N/A	N/A	Originally described as a bird; more likely a chimaera of several vertebrates.	
Protopteryx	Zhang & Zhou	2000	Valid	Early Cretaceous	China		
Pterodactylus	Rafinesque	1815	Misidentification	N/A	N/A	Sometimes thought to be a bird before being described as a pterosaur.	
Pterygornis	Wang et al.	2015	Valid	Early Cretaceous	China		
Pujatopouli	Irazoqui et al.	2025	Valid	Late Cretaceous	Antarctica		
Qiliania	Ji et al.	2011	Valid	Early Cretaceous	China		
Rahona	Forster et al.	1998a	Preoccupied	N/A	N/A	Name preoccupied by the moth Rahona Griveaud 1975 and replaced by Rahonavis.	
Rahonavis	Forster et al.	1998b	Valid	Late Cretaceous	Madagascar	Considered a non-avialan theropod by some researchers.	
Rapaxavis	Morschhauser et al.	2009	Valid	Early Cretaceous	China		
Rhamphorhynchus	Meyer	1846	Misidentification	N/A	N/A	Originally thought to be a bird before being described as a pterosaur.	
Samrukia	Naish et al.	2012	Misidentification	N/A	N/A	Originally described as a bird; actually a pterosaur.	
Sapeornis	Zhou & Zhang	2002	Valid	Early Cretaceous	China		
Sazavis	Nesov	1989	Valid	Late Cretaceous	Uzbekistan		
Scansoriopteryx	Czerkas & Yuan	2002	Valid	Late Jurassic	China	Considered a non-avialan theropod by some researchers.	
Schizooura	Zhou et al.	2012	Valid	Early Cretaceous	China		
Serikornis	Lefèvre et al.	2017	Valid	Late Jurassic	China	Considered a non-avialan theropod by some researchers.	
Shangyang	Wang & Zhou	2019	Valid	Early Cretaceous	China		
Shanweiniao	O'Connor et al.	2009	Valid	Early Cretaceous	China		
Shengjingornis	Li et al.	2012	Valid	Early Cretaceous	China		
Shenqiornis	Wang et al.	2010	Valid	Early Cretaceous	China		
Shenshiornis	Hu	2010	Junior synonym	Early Cretaceous	China	Junior synonym of Sapeornis.	
Shenzhouraptor	Ji et al.	2002	Disputed	Early Cretaceous	China	Possible synonym of Jeholornis.	
Shuilingornis	Wang et al.	2025	Valid	Early Cretaceous	China		
Similiyanornis	Wang et al.	2020	Valid	Early Cretaceous	China		
Sinornis	Sereno & Rao	1992	Valid	Early Cretaceous	China		
Songlingornis	Hou	1997	Valid	Early Cretaceous	China		
Soroavisaurus	Chiappe	1993	Valid	Late Cretaceous	Argentina		
Struthiosaurus	Bunzel	1871	Misidentification	N/A	N/A	Originally thought to be a bird; actually an ankylosaurian dinosaur.	
"Styginetta"	Stidham	2001	Nomen nudum	N/A	N/A	Obscure; named in a thesis.	
Sulcavis	O'Connor et al.	2013	Valid	Early Cretaceous	China		
Telmatornis	Marsh	1870	Valid	Late Cretaceous	United States		
Tenuicruris	White et al.	2026	Valid	Early Cretaceous	Australia		
Teviornis	Kurochkin et al.	2002	Valid	Late Cretaceous	Mongolia		
Tianyuornis	Zheng et al.	2014	Valid	Early Cretaceous	China		
Tingmiatornis	Bono et al.	2016	Valid	Late Cretaceous	Canada		
Torotix	Brodkorb	1963	Valid	Late Cretaceous	United States		
Tytthostonyx	Olson & Parris	1987	Valid	Late Cretaceous	United States		
Vegavis	Clarke et al.	2005	Valid	Late Cretaceous	Antarctica		
Vescornis	Zhang et al.	2004	Disputed	Early Cretaceous	China	Possible junior synonym of Jibeinia.	
Volgavis	Nessov & Yarkov	1989	Valid	Late Cretaceous	Russia		
Vorona	Forster et al.	1996	Valid	Late Cretaceous	Madagascar		
Wasaibpanchi	Malkani	2021	Disputed	Late Cretaceous	Pakistan	Publication status uncertain.	
Wellnhoferia	Elżanowski	2001	Disputed	Late Jurassic	Germany	Possible junior synonym of Archaeopteryx.	
Wyleyia	Harrison & Walker	1973	Valid	Early Cretaceous	England		
Xiangornis	Hu et al.	2012	Valid	Early Cretaceous	China		
Xinghaiornis	Wang et al.	2013	Valid	Early Cretaceous	China		
Xiaotingia	Xu et al.	2011	Valid	Late Jurassic	China	Considered a non-avialan theropod by some researchers.	
Yandangornis	Cai & Zhao	1999	Valid	Late Cretaceous	China		
Yangavis	Wang et al.	2018	Valid	Early Cretaceous	China		
Yanornis	Zhou & Zhang	2001	Valid	Early Cretaceous	China		
Yatenavis	Herrera et al.	2022	Valid	Late Cretaceous	Argentina		
Yi	Xu et al.	2015	Valid	Late Jurassic	China	Considered a non-avialan theropod by some researchers.	
Yixianornis	Zhou & Zhang	2001	Valid	Early Cretaceous	China		
Yixianosaurus	Xu & Wang	2003	Valid	Early Cretaceous	China	Considered a non-avialan theropod by some researchers.	
Yuanchuavis	Wang et al.	2021	Valid	Early Cretaceous	China		
Yuanjiawaornis	Hu et al.	2015	Valid	Early Cretaceous	China		
Yuezhouornis	Xu et al.	2026	Valid	Late Jurassic	China	May be a non-avialan dinosaur	
Yumenornis	Wang et al.	2013	Valid	Early Cretaceous	China		
Yungavolucris	Chiappe	1993	Valid	Late Cretaceous	Argentina		
Yuornis	Xu et al.	2021	Valid	Late Cretaceous	China		
Zhengheornis	Wang et al.	2026	Valid	Late Jurassic	China		
Zhongjianornis	Zhou et al.	2010	Valid	Early Cretaceous	China		
Zhongornis	Gao et al.	2008	Valid	Early Cretaceous	China		
Zhouornis	Zhang et al.	2013	Valid	Early Cretaceous	China		
Zhylgaia	Nessov	1988	Valid	Late Cretaceous	Kazakhstan	Dating is uncertain; may be Late Cretaceous or Paleogene.	
Zhyraornis	Nessov	1984	Valid	Late Cretaceous	Uzbekistan		

== See also ==
- List of dinosaur genera - for non-avialan dinosaurs
