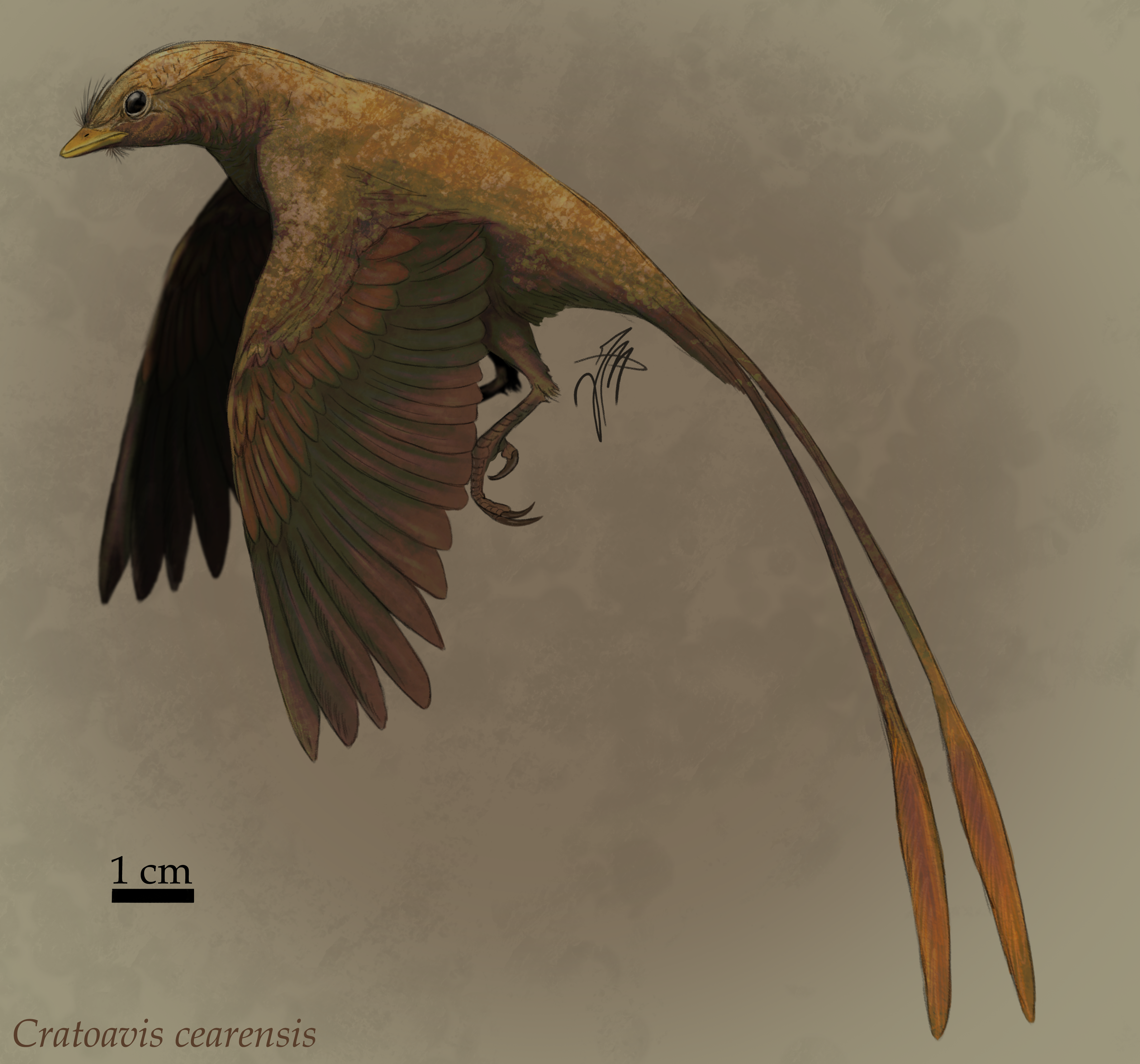

Scientific classification
- Domain: Eukaryota
- Kingdom: Animalia
- Phylum: Chordata
- Clade: Dinosauria
- Clade: Saurischia
- Clade: Theropoda
- Clade: Avialae
- Clade: †Enantiornithes
- Clade: †Euenantiornithes
- Genus: †Cratoavis; Carvalho et al., 2015
- Species: †C. cearensis

Binomial name
- †Cratoavis cearensis Carvalho et al., 2015

= Cratoavis =

Cratoavis Temporal range: Aptian ~125–113 Ma

Extinct genus of dinosaurs

Cratoavis is a genus of enantiornithines. The type and only currently described species is C. cearensis, from the Early Cretaceous of Araripe Basin, Ceará, Brazil. The fossil, an articulated skeleton with feathers attached to the wings and surrounding the body, extends considerably the temporal record of the group at South America.

The genus was named after the Crato Formation, in which the specimen was found. The holotype is associated with elements of at least two Dastilbe specimens, which were situated close to the region corresponding to the intestine and cecum. This indicates that these fish were probably contained within the digestive tract of Cratoavis, which would make the holotype preserving a direct evidence of piscivory (fish-eating).

== Phylogeny ==
Cratoavis in the cladogram from Wang et al., 2022:

- Enantiornithes l
  - Cruralispennia
  - - Protopteryx
    - - - Elsornis
        - Flexomornis
      - - Longipterygidae
          - Iberomesornis
          - bh
            - bh
              Longirostravis
            - Rapaxavis
        - Euenantiornithes
          - c
            - e
              Sinornis
            - e
              - Enantiornis
              - - Halimornis
                - - Concornis
                  - Neuquenornis
            - c
              - b
                - Eoalulavis
                - Liaoningornis
              - - Gobipteryx
                - Hebeiornis
          - - Eocathayornis
            - - - Qiliania
                - Avisauridae e
                  - - Intiornis
                    - Soroavisaurus
                  - - Avisaurus
                    - - Gettyia
                      - n
                        Mirarce
              - - Feitianius
                - - - fn
                      Longusunguis
                    - fn
                      - n
                        Dunhuangia
                      - fn
                        Musivavis
                  - - Pengornithidae m
                      - Pengornis
                      - m
                        - Yuanchuavis
                        - - Eopengornis
                          - Parapengornis
                    - - - Grabauornis
                        - - Parvavis
                          - - Cratoavis
                            - Gretcheniao
                      - - - Huoshanornis
                          - Shengjingornis
                        - - Zhouornis
                          - Bohaiornithidae
                            - Bohaiornis
                            - ij
                              - Eoenantiornis
                              - - Fortunguavis
                                - - Mystiornis
                                  - - Shenqiornis
                                    - Sulcavis

Key to letters:

b = Boluochia
c = Cathayornis
e = Enantiophoenix
f = Houornis
h = Longipteryx
i = Parabohaiornis
j = Pterygornis
l = Vorona
m = Yuanjiawaornis
n = Yungavolucris
