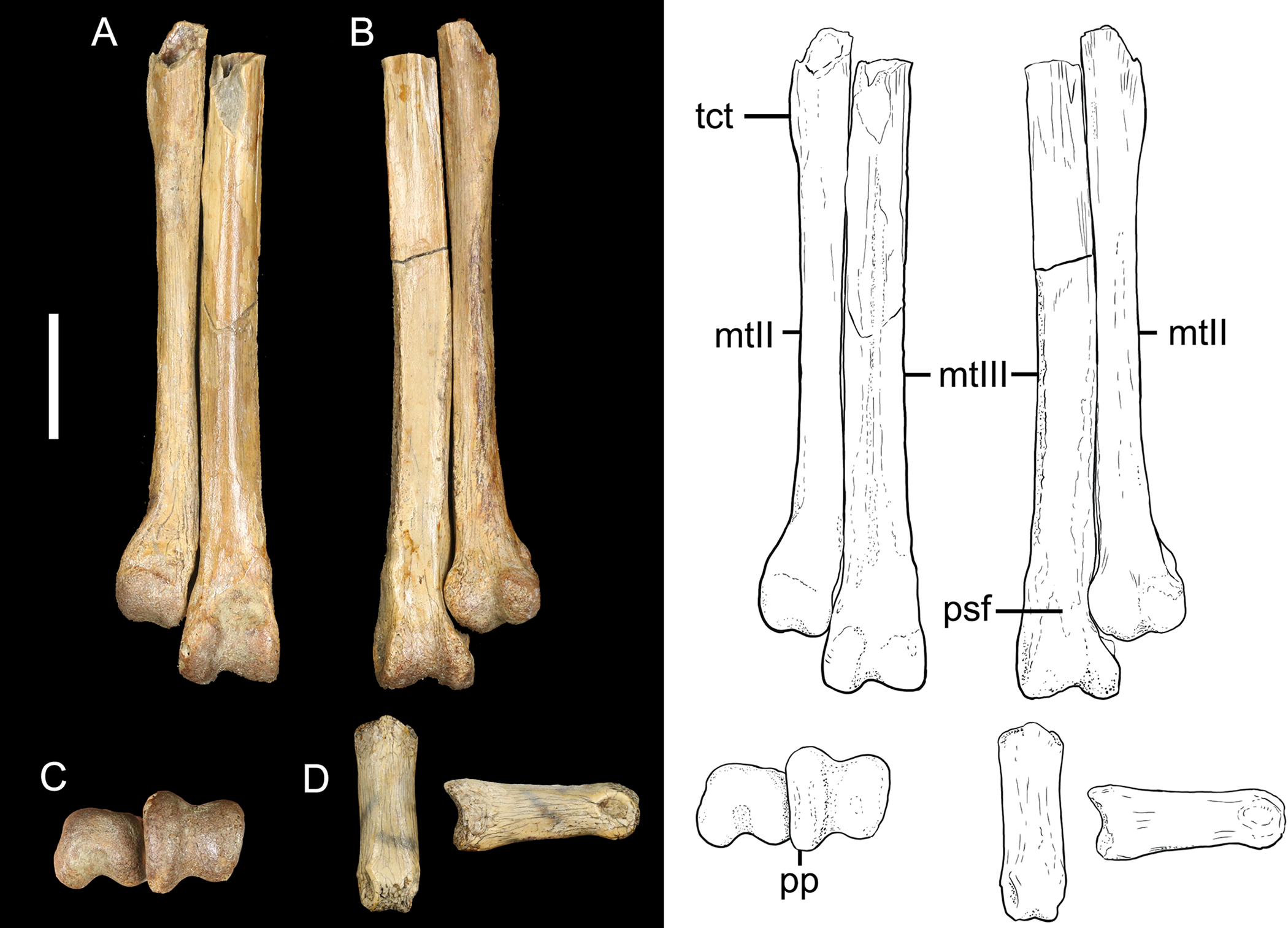
- Holotype specimen

Scientific classification
- Kingdom: Animalia
- Phylum: Chordata
- Class: Reptilia
- Clade: Dinosauria
- Clade: Saurischia
- Clade: Theropoda
- Clade: Avialae
- Clade: †Enantiornithes
- Genus: †Magnusavis
- Species: †M. ekalakaensis

Binomial name
- †Magnusavis ekalakaensis Clark et al., 2024

Synonyms
- Magnusavis ekalakaenis Clark et al., 2024 (lapsus calami)

= Magnusavis =

Magnusavis Temporal range: Late Cretaceous (Maastrichtian), 66 Ma

Genus of enantiornithean birds

Magnusavis (meaning "big bird") is an extinct genus of large enantiornithean birds from the Late Cretaceous (Maastrichtian-aged) Hell Creek Formation of Montana, United States. The genus contains a single species, M. ekalakaensis, known from an incomplete right tarsometatarsus and toe bone.

== Discovery and naming ==
The Magnusavis holotype specimen, CCM V2019.5.1, was discovered in sediments of the Hell Creek Formation on BLM land in Carter County, Montana, United States. The specimen consists of part of the right tarsometatarsus missing metatarsal IV and the top of II and III, in addition to an isolated phalanx from an unknown toe.

In 2024, Clark et al. described Magnusavis ekalakaensis as a new genus and species of enantiornithean birds based on these fossil remains. The generic name, Magnusavis, combines the Latin words magnus ("big") and avis ("bird"). The specific name, ekalakaensis, references the Montana town of Ekalaka (a Lakota word meaning "one who wanders"), which is near the type locality and where the holotype is accessioned.

== Classification ==
In their phylogenetic analyses, Clark et al. recovered Magnusavis as a member of the avian clade Enantiornithes, a group of diverse birds that went extinct at the end of the Cretaceous. Their results did not place this taxon within any enantiornithean family, but rather as a member of a group leading to the raptorial avisaurids. Their results are displayed in the cladogram below:

- Ornithothoraces
  - Euornithes
  - †Enantiornithes
    - - Protopteryx
      - Iberomesornis
    - - - Shanweiniao
        - - Rapaxavis
          - Longirostravis
      - - Longipteryx
        - - - Bauxitornis
            - Gobipteryx
          - - Eocathayornis
            - - - Eoenantiornis
                - - Eoalulavis
                  - - Concornis
                    - Cathayornis
              - - - Pengornis
                  - Eopengornis
                - - Magnusavis
                  - Mystiornis
                  - Neuquenornis
                  - Halimornis
                  - Intiornis
                  - Shenqiornis
                  - Elsornis
                  - Avisauridae
                    - MOR 3070
                    - Soroavisaurus
                    - - - Avisaurus darwini
                        - Avisaurus archibaldi
                      - - Mirarce
                        - Gettyia
