= Enantiornis =

Enantiornis Temporal range: Maastrichtian ~70 Ma

Scientific classification
- Kingdom: Animalia
- Phylum: Chordata
- Class: Reptilia
- Clade: Dinosauria
- Clade: Saurischia
- Clade: Theropoda
- Clade: Avialae
- Clade: †Enantiornithes
- Order: †Enantiornithiformes; Martin, 1983
- Family: †Enantiornithidae; Nesov, 1984
- Genus: †Enantiornis; Walker, 1981
- Species: †E. leali

Binomial name
- †Enantiornis leali Walker, 1981

Extinct genus of dinosaurs

Enantiornis is a genus of Enantiornithes. The type and only currently accepted species E. leali is from the Late Cretaceous Lecho Formation at El Brete, Argentina. It was described from specimen PVL-4035, a coracoid, proximal scapula and proximal humerus found close to each other and suspected to represent the left shoulder of a single individual.

== Description ==
The genus and the larger group it belongs to, get their name from the reversed scapula-coracoid connection they possess compared to modern birds and the hesperornithids that were their contemporaries: Enanti "opposite", ornis is "bird".

Another left shoulder and wing, almost complete and found associated in one lump of rock, as well as a few isolated bones were also assigned to this species mainly based on size. It is among the largest enantiornithines discovered to date, with a length in life of around 78.5 cm (30.9 in), hip height of 34 cm (13 in), weight of 6.75 kg (14.9 lb), and wingspan comparable to herring gulls, around 1.2 m (3 ft 11 in). Its ecological niche resembled that of a mid-sized vulture or eagle.

== Taxonomy and phylogeny ==
E. leali was possibly fairly closely related to Avisaurus, another genus of probably carnivorous enantiornithines, though its exact relationship is unclear. It was placed in a family of its own, Enantiornithidae. Other species from Asia that were previously placed in this genus are now split off. The former Enantiornis martini is now placed in Incolornis, while the former Enantiornis walkeri is now tentatively assigned to Explorornis. The reason for this is that these species were described when the diversity of enantiornithines was underestimated.

As no hindlimb elements are known from Enantiornis, it might include one of the El Brete enantiornithines known only from leg bones, namely Lectavis, Soroavisaurus or Yungavolucris. However, these apparently were all smaller than Enantiornis. Hindlimb material tentatively assigned to Martinavis and Elbretornis seems somewhat and a lot too small, respectively, to represent Enantiornis.

The cladogram below is from Wang et al., 2022:

- Enantiornithes l
  - Cruralispennia
  - - Protopteryx
    - - - Elsornis
        - Flexomornis
      - - Longipterygidae
          - Iberomesornis
          - bh
            - bh
              Longirostravis
            - Rapaxavis
        - Euenantiornithes
          - c
            - e
              Sinornis
            - e
              - Enantiornis
              - - Halimornis
                - - Concornis
                  - Neuquenornis
            - c
              - b
                - Eoalulavis
                - Liaoningornis
              - - Gobipteryx
                - Hebeiornis
          - - Eocathayornis
            - - - Qiliania
                - Avisauridae e
                  - - Intiornis
                    - Soroavisaurus
                  - - Avisaurus
                    - - Gettyia
                      - n
                        Mirarce
              - - Feitianius
                - - - fn
                      Longusunguis
                    - fn
                      - n
                        Dunhuangia
                      - fn
                        Musivavis
                  - - Pengornithidae m
                      - Pengornis
                      - m
                        - Yuanchuavis
                        - - Eopengornis
                          - Parapengornis
                    - - - Grabauornis
                        - - Parvavis
                          - - Cratoavis
                            - Gretcheniao
                      - - - Huoshanornis
                          - Shengjingornis
                        - - Zhouornis
                          - Bohaiornithidae
                            - Bohaiornis
                            - ij
                              - Eoenantiornis
                              - - Fortunguavis
                                - - Mystiornis
                                  - - Shenqiornis
                                    - Sulcavis

Key to letters:

b = Boluochia
c = Cathayornis
e = Enantiophoenix
f = Houornis
h = Longipteryx
i = Parabohaiornis
j = Pterygornis
l = Vorona
m = Yuanjiawaornis
n = Yungavolucris
