= Neuquenornis =

Neuquenornis Temporal range: Late Cretaceous, 85 Ma

Scientific classification
- Kingdom: Animalia
- Phylum: Chordata
- Class: Reptilia
- Clade: Dinosauria
- Clade: Saurischia
- Clade: Theropoda
- Clade: Avialae
- Clade: †Enantiornithes
- Family: †Avisauridae
- Genus: †Neuquenornis; Chiappe & Calvo 1994
- Species: †N. volans

Binomial name
- †Neuquenornis volans Chiappe & Calvo 1994

Extinct species of bird

Neuquenornis volans is a species of enantiornithean birds which lived during the late Cretaceous period in today's Patagonia, Argentina. It is the only known species of the genus Neuquenornis. Its fossils were found in the Santonian Bajo de la Carpa Formation, dating from about 85-83 million years ago. This was a sizeable bird for its time, with a tarsometatarsus 46.8mm long. Informal estimates suggest that it measured nearly 30 cm (12 in) in length excluding the tail.

== Etymology ==
The naming means "Flying bird from Neuquén Province". Neuquenornis, from Neuquén Province + Ancient Greek ornis (όρνις) "bird". volans, Latin for "flying" in reference to the species' well-developed wing skeleton.

== Description ==
N. volans was described by Chiappe and Calvo in 1994. It was also mentioned in previous papers by Chiappe, but named only by its catalog number. The holotype fossil is catalogued as MUCPv-142. It is in the collection of the Museo de Ciencias Naturales, Universidad Nacional del Comahue, Neuquen, Argentina. MUCPv-142, a skull and a partial postcranial remains, indicates an animal with a length of 23.5 cm (9.3 in), hip height of 17 cm (6.7 in), and weight of 205 g (7.2 oz).

== Phylogeny ==
Chiappe and Calvo (1994) placed N. volans in the Family Avisauridae, near Avisaurus in the Enantiornithiformes. A more recent, unpublished, unreviewed, analysis that includes many newly described Enantiornithes finds it closer to Concornis and Cathayornis (or Sinornis).

The cladogram below is from Wang et al., 2015:

- Ornithothoraces
  - Euornithes
  - †Enantiornithes
    - †Protopteryx
    - †Pengornithidae
    - †Longipterygidae
    - †Euenantiornithes
      - †Eocathayornis
      - - †Elsornis
        - - †Dunhuangia
          - †Fortunguavis
          - - †Bohaiornithidae
            - - †Pterygornis
              - - †Eoenantiornis
                - - †Cathayornis
                  - - †Vescornis
                    - †Neuquenornis
                    - †Gobipteryx
                    - †Eoalulavis
                    - - †Qiliania
                      - †Concornis

The cladogram below is from Wang et al., 2022:

- Enantiornithes l
  - Cruralispennia
  - - Protopteryx
    - - - Elsornis
        - Flexomornis
      - - Longipterygidae
          - Iberomesornis
          - bh
            - bh
              Longirostravis
            - Rapaxavis
        - Euenantiornithes
          - c
            - e
              Sinornis
            - e
              - Enantiornis
              - - Halimornis
                - - Concornis
                  - Neuquenornis
            - c
              - b
                - Eoalulavis
                - Liaoningornis
              - - Gobipteryx
                - Hebeiornis
          - - Eocathayornis
            - - - Qiliania
                - Avisauridae e
                  - - Intiornis
                    - Soroavisaurus
                  - - Avisaurus
                    - - Gettyia
                      - n
                        Mirarce
              - - Feitianius
                - - - fn
                      Longusunguis
                    - fn
                      - n
                        Dunhuangia
                      - fn
                        Musivavis
                  - - Pengornithidae m
                      - Pengornis
                      - m
                        - Yuanchuavis
                        - - Eopengornis
                          - Parapengornis
                    - - - Grabauornis
                        - - Parvavis
                          - - Cratoavis
                            - Gretcheniao
                      - - - Huoshanornis
                          - Shengjingornis
                        - - Zhouornis
                          - Bohaiornithidae
                            - Bohaiornis
                            - ij
                              - Eoenantiornis
                              - - Fortunguavis
                                - - Mystiornis
                                  - - Shenqiornis
                                    - Sulcavis

Key to letters:

b = Boluochia
c = Cathayornis
e = Enantiophoenix
f = Houornis
h = Longipteryx
i = Parabohaiornis
j = Pterygornis
l = Vorona
m = Yuanjiawaornis
n = Yungavolucris

== Paleobiology ==
Long legs with hooked claws were well suited for perching as well as for gathering food on ground or shallow water. A nesting colony has been attributed to this bird, showcasing that it display megapode-like egg burial behaviour.
