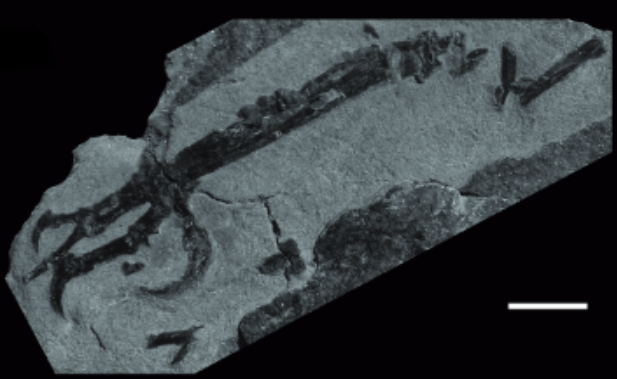
- The holotype partial hind limb of Intiornis

Scientific classification
- Kingdom: Animalia
- Phylum: Chordata
- Class: Reptilia
- Clade: Dinosauria
- Clade: Saurischia
- Clade: Theropoda
- Clade: Avialae
- Clade: †Enantiornithes
- Family: †Avisauridae
- Genus: †Intiornis; Novas et al. 2010
- Species: †I. inexpectatus

Binomial name
- †Intiornis inexpectatus Novas et al. 2010

= Intiornis =

Intiornis Temporal range: Campanian ~75 Ma

Extinct genus of birds

Intiornis (meaning "Inti bird", the binominal naming means "Unexpected Sun bird") is an extinct genus of avisaurid enantiornithean birds which existed in what is now North-West Argentina during the late Cretaceous period (Campanian age).

== Description ==
The genus is known from a partial hind limb found in beds of the Upper Cretaceous Las Curtiembres Formation. Three primary toes on a limb of Intiornis are nearly the same length. It was named by Fernando Emilio Novas, Federico Lisandro Agnolín and Carlos Agustín Scanferla in 2010, and the type species is Intiornis inexpectatus. With the body length of around 15 cm (5.9 in) Intiornis was the size of a sparrow, thus representing the smallest enantiornithes known from South America. Its closest relative was Soroavisaurus from the Lecho Formation (Maastrichtian age) of northwestern Argentina.

== Phylogeny ==
The cladogram below is from Wang et al., 2022:

- Enantiornithes l
  - Cruralispennia
  - - Protopteryx
    - - - Elsornis
        - Flexomornis
      - - Longipterygidae
          - Iberomesornis
          - bh
            - bh
              Longirostravis
            - Rapaxavis
        - Euenantiornithes
          - c
            - e
              Sinornis
            - e
              - Enantiornis
              - - Halimornis
                - - Concornis
                  - Neuquenornis
            - c
              - b
                - Eoalulavis
                - Liaoningornis
              - - Gobipteryx
                - Hebeiornis
          - - Eocathayornis
            - - - Qiliania
                - Avisauridae e
                  - - Intiornis
                    - Soroavisaurus
                  - - Avisaurus
                    - - Gettyia
                      - n
                        Mirarce
              - - Feitianius
                - - - fn
                      Longusunguis
                    - fn
                      - n
                        Dunhuangia
                      - fn
                        Musivavis
                  - - Pengornithidae m
                      - Pengornis
                      - m
                        - Yuanchuavis
                        - - Eopengornis
                          - Parapengornis
                    - - - Grabauornis
                        - - Parvavis
                          - - Cratoavis
                            - Gretcheniao
                      - - - Huoshanornis
                          - Shengjingornis
                        - - Zhouornis
                          - Bohaiornithidae
                            - Bohaiornis
                            - ij
                              - Eoenantiornis
                              - - Fortunguavis
                                - - Mystiornis
                                  - - Shenqiornis
                                    - Sulcavis

Key to letters:

b = Boluochia
c = Cathayornis
e = Enantiophoenix
f = Houornis
h = Longipteryx
i = Parabohaiornis
j = Pterygornis
l = Vorona
m = Yuanjiawaornis
n = Yungavolucris

== Paleobiology ==
Long toes of equal length and large curved claws suggest adaptability for perching.
