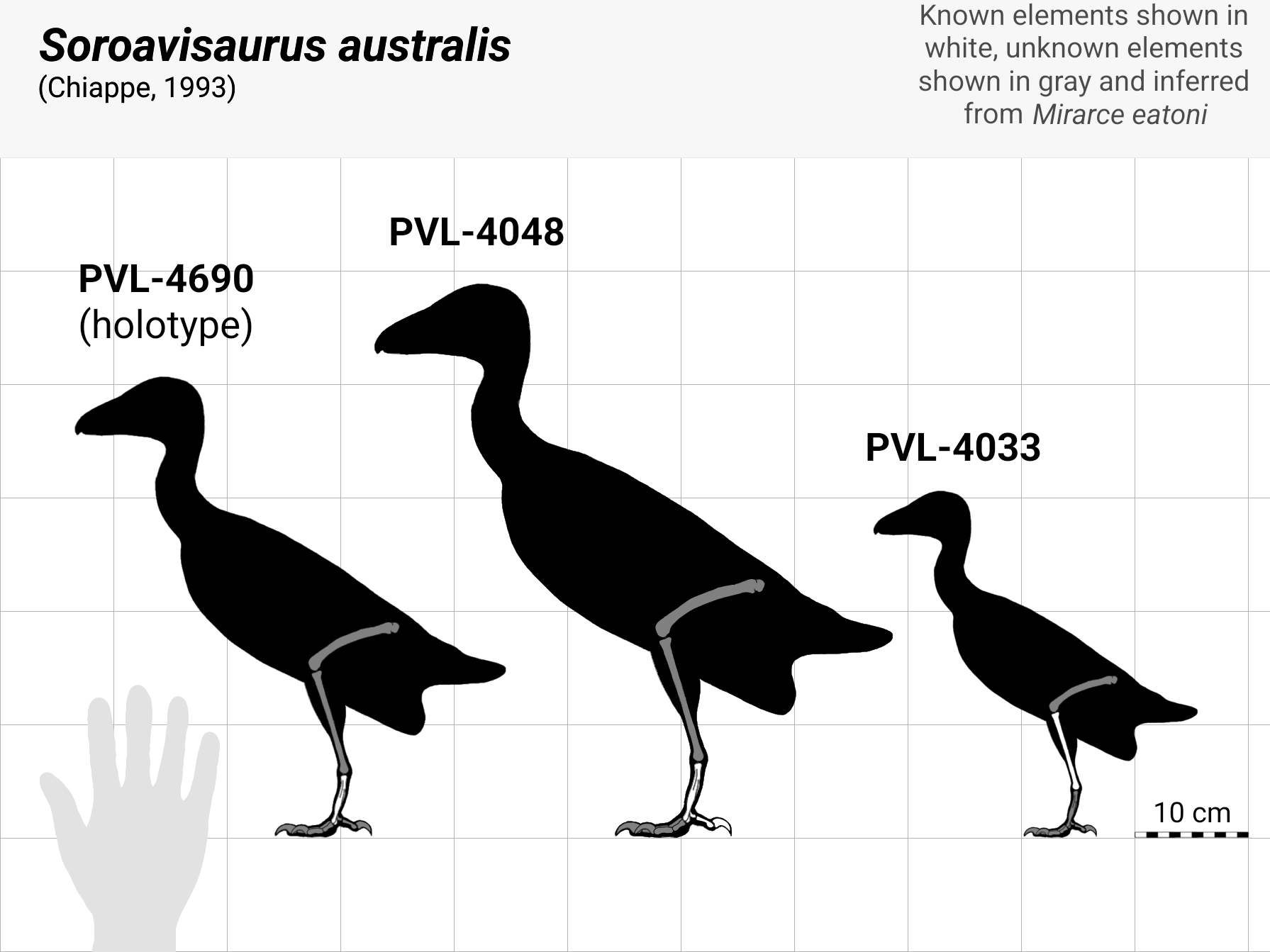
- Skeletal diagram showing preserved elements of the three known specimens

Scientific classification
- Kingdom: Animalia
- Phylum: Chordata
- Class: Reptilia
- Clade: Dinosauria
- Clade: Saurischia
- Clade: Theropoda
- Clade: Avialae
- Clade: †Enantiornithes
- Family: †Avisauridae
- Genus: †Soroavisaurus; Chiappe, 1993
- Species: †S. australis

Binomial name
- †Soroavisaurus australis Chiappe, 1993

= Soroavisaurus =

Soroavisaurus Temporal range: Late Cretaceous (Maastrichtian), ~71–69 Ma

Extinct genus of birds

Soroavisaurus is an extinct genus of enantiornithine birds that lived in South America during the Late Cretaceous period, about 71–69 million years ago. The only known species, Soroavisaurus australis, was named in 1993; the generic name means "sister to Avisaurus" (another enantiornithine believed to be its relative) while the specific name means "southern". All specimens confidently assigned to this species are fossilised leg bones collected from the Lecho Formation of El Brete, a locality in the province of Salta, Argentina. Some authors have proposed that either Enantiornis or Martinavis, which are known from wing bones found at the same locality, may represent the same animal as Soroavisaurus. However it is difficult to confirm which (if either) of these truly is the same species.

The body length of Soroavisaurus has been estimated at about 40 cm (16 in), but the disparity in size among known specimens suggests that some individuals grew larger than others. This animal is characterised by its tarsometatarsus, a leg bone formed by the fusion of the tarsal and metatarsal bones; specifically, there is a gap in the upper part between two of the metatarsals, which is not known in any other enantiornithine. Soroavisaurus is a member of the family Avisauridae, but its exact position within this family has been debated; the North American forms Avisaurus and Gettyia were originally thought to be its closest relatives, but other South American forms like Intiornis were later proposed to be closer to it, and some authors place Soroavisaurus as an early-diverging member of the family.

Soroavisaurus would have been a carnivore, using its sharp, curved talons to carry prey while flying in a manner reminiscent of modern birds of prey, though its foot structure suggests that its exact ecological niche differs from that of its living counterparts. The Lecho Formation dates to the Maastrichtian age and was deposited on a warm, humid coastal plain with tropical forests, ponds and lagoons. In this habitat, Soroavisaurus would have lived alongside many animals, including other species of enantiornithine birds and non-avian dinosaurs.

== Discovery and naming ==
In 1975, fossil-bearing deposits of the Lecho Formation were discovered at the locality of El Brete, Salta Province, Argentina by a team from the Fundación Miguel Lillo. In the years after this, Argentine paleontologist José Bonaparte carried out field surveys at this site. Among the discoveries made were about 60 fossilised bird bones, which were added to the collection of the National University of Tucumán. In 1981, British paleontologist Cyril Walker published a study in which he illustrated some of these bones and determined that while they represent multiple species, all of them would have been members of a group which he named the Enantiornithes. In particular, he points out that three types of tarsometatarsi (one of the bones in a bird leg) are present in the collection.

Twelve years after Walker's study was published, Argentine paleontologist Luis M. Chiappe studied the bird tarsometatarsi from El Brete and named each of the three types as new genera and species, one of which was given the name Soroavisaurus australis. The generic name combines the Latin word soror (meaning "sister") with Avisaurus (another fossil bird), as Chiappe determined these two types of birds to be close relatives, while the specific name means "southern". He designated a left tarsometatarsus with the specimen number PVL-4690 as the holotype of this species, in addition to assigning another specimen (PVL-4048) to it. Both of these specimens were formerly thought to be remains of a species of Avisaurus.

More of the enantiornithine specimens from El Brete have been assigned to Soroavisaurus after the genus was erected, though some of these referrals have been questioned. In 2002, Walker and Chiappe suggested the specimens PVL-4030 and PVL-4033 to be fossilised tibiotarsi (another bone in a bird leg) of Soroavisaurus. Walker had previously considered both of these specimens to be comparable to Martinavis, referring to both as cf. Martinavis in an unpublished manuscript. In 2009, he authored another study with Irish paleontologist Gareth J. Dyke which once again finds PVL-4030 to be a Martinavis specimen, assigning it to an unnamed species of the genus. However, this study still considers PVL-4033 to be a Soroavisaurus tibiotarsus.

In a study published in 2007, it was suggested that Soroavisaurus may be a junior synonym of Enantiornis, which is known from the same locality. While Soroavisaurus is only known from leg remains, Enantiornis is known from wing material, and the authors suggest that these fossils may represent different parts of the same species. If this were the case, Enantiornis would be the valid name of this animal, as it was established before Soroavisaurus was. However, the authors acknowledge that it is difficult to determine which (if any) of the El Brete enantiornithines known only from wing bones represent the same species as any of those known only from leg bones, and that one of the Martinavis species (rather than Enantiornis) may instead represent the wings of Soroavisaurus. As Soroavisaurus was named before Martinavis, the former would be the valid name of the animal in this case.

== Description ==
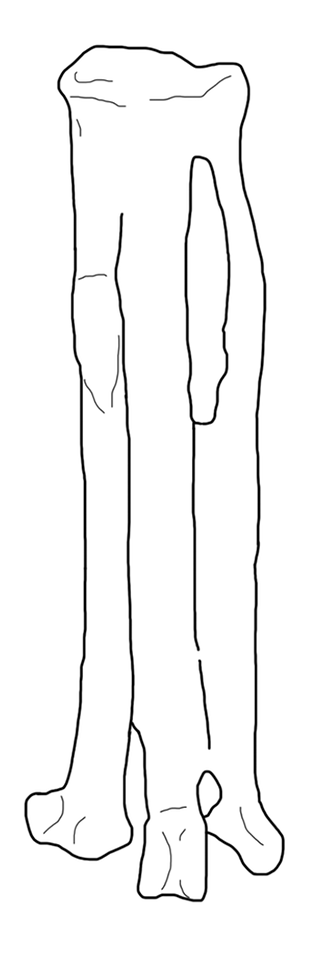
Illustration of the holotype tarsometatarsus

All known specimens of Soroavisaurus preserve only bones from the hind limbs. The holotype, PVL-4690, is a 46.9 mm (1.85 in) long left tarsometatarsus. A larger specimen, PVL-4048, includes another left tarsometatarsus, which is 51.5 mm (2.03 in) long and associated with the whole hallux (digit I) and four intermediate phalanges (toe bones). In a book published in 2012, science illustrator Matthew P. Martyniuk estimated that the animal had a body length of about 40 cm (16 in) in life, but did not estimate its wingspan as none of its wing elements have been preserved, instead stating that the wingspan is "unknown". The tarsometatarsus is slender and formed from the fusion of the tarsal and metatarsal bones, though the metatarsals of Soroavisaurus are fused only in the proximal (upper) portion. The metatarsals are shaped such that they form a depression in the hind part of the tarsometatarsus starting near the top and stretching down about two-thirds the length of the bone. When seen from above, the articular (joint) surface at the proximal end of the tarsometatarsus is kidney-shaped, as the hind surface curves slightly inwards. Of the three metatarsals (II, III and IV) that form the tarsometatarsus, metatarsal III is the largest. It is located between the other two, and is spaced more widely apart from metatarsal II than from metatarsal IV. Metatarsal IV is weaker than the other two as it is flattened and slender, particularly in its proximal half, such that a gap is formed between it and metatarsal III in the upper part of the tarsometatarsus. This gap is a defining feature of Soroavisaurus and is not present in any other known enantiornithine bird.

At the bottom end of the tarsometatarsus are three swollen structures known as trochleae, one at the end of each metatarsal, which would each have joined to a toe. The trochlea of metatarsal II is the largest. The trochlea of metatarsal IV has a vaguely triangular outline when viewed from below, with a bony projection on the inner edge which almost seals a small gap between metatarsals III and IV. This is a feature distinguishing Soroavisaurus from the related Avisaurus, in which the trochlea of metatarsal IV has a more crescent-like outline when seen from below, and the projection sealing the gap between metatarsals III and IV is higher up on the latter metatarsal.

The specimen PVL-4048 preserves the first digit and its associated metatarsal (referred to as digit I and metatarsal I respectively). Metatarsal I is a curved, flattened bone resembling the letter J in shape, and is thinner at the end connecting to the leg than at the end that joins to the toe. Though this metatarsal is not reversed, its associated digit is. Digit I is formed by two phalanx bones; the one joined to metatarsal I has a swollen articular surface that joins to the other phalanx, which in turn forms a sharp, curved talon.

== Classification ==
Soroavisaurus belongs to an extinct clade of avialans (birds, in a broad sense) known as the Enantiornithes. Within this clade, it has been determined to be a close relative of the North American Avisaurus, and has therefore been placed alongside it in the family Avisauridae. In the initial description of Soroavisaurus published in 1993, Luis M. Chiappe considered it to be at a sister group position to the clade consisting of Avisaurus and a then-unnamed avisaurid from the Two Medicine Formation of Montana (which has since been named Gettyia). Later studies added more genera into Avisauridae which are sometimes recovered as closer relatives of Soroavisaurus than Avisaurus or Gettyia, with one published in 2018 placing Soroavisaurus as the sister group to a clade consisting of Intiornis and Neuquenornis. A similar result was recovered in a 2022 study, though this study places Neuquenornis outside of Avisauridae, leaving Intiornis and Soroavisaurus as sister taxa. The cladogram below shows the position of Soroavisaurus within its family according to said study:

- Avisauridae
  - - Intiornis
    - Soroavisaurus
  - - Avisaurus
    - - Gettyia
      - Mirarce

A 2024 publication revised the classification of Avisauridae and retained only six members in the family, excluding other genera that were formerly considered members of this group. With this revision, Intiornis was no longer deemed the closest relative of Soroavisaurus, and instead was considered a more basal (earlier-diverging) member of a group leading to Avisauridae. Meanwhile, Soroavisaurus was retained in a basal position within Avisauridae. The cladogram below shows the results of this publication:

- - Magnusavis
  - Mystiornis
  - Neuquenornis
  - Halimornis
  - Intiornis
  - Shenqiornis
  - Elsornis
  - Avisauridae
    - MOR 3070
    - Soroavisaurus
    - - - Avisaurus darwini
        - Avisaurus archibaldi
      - - Mirarce
        - Gettyia

== Paleobiology ==
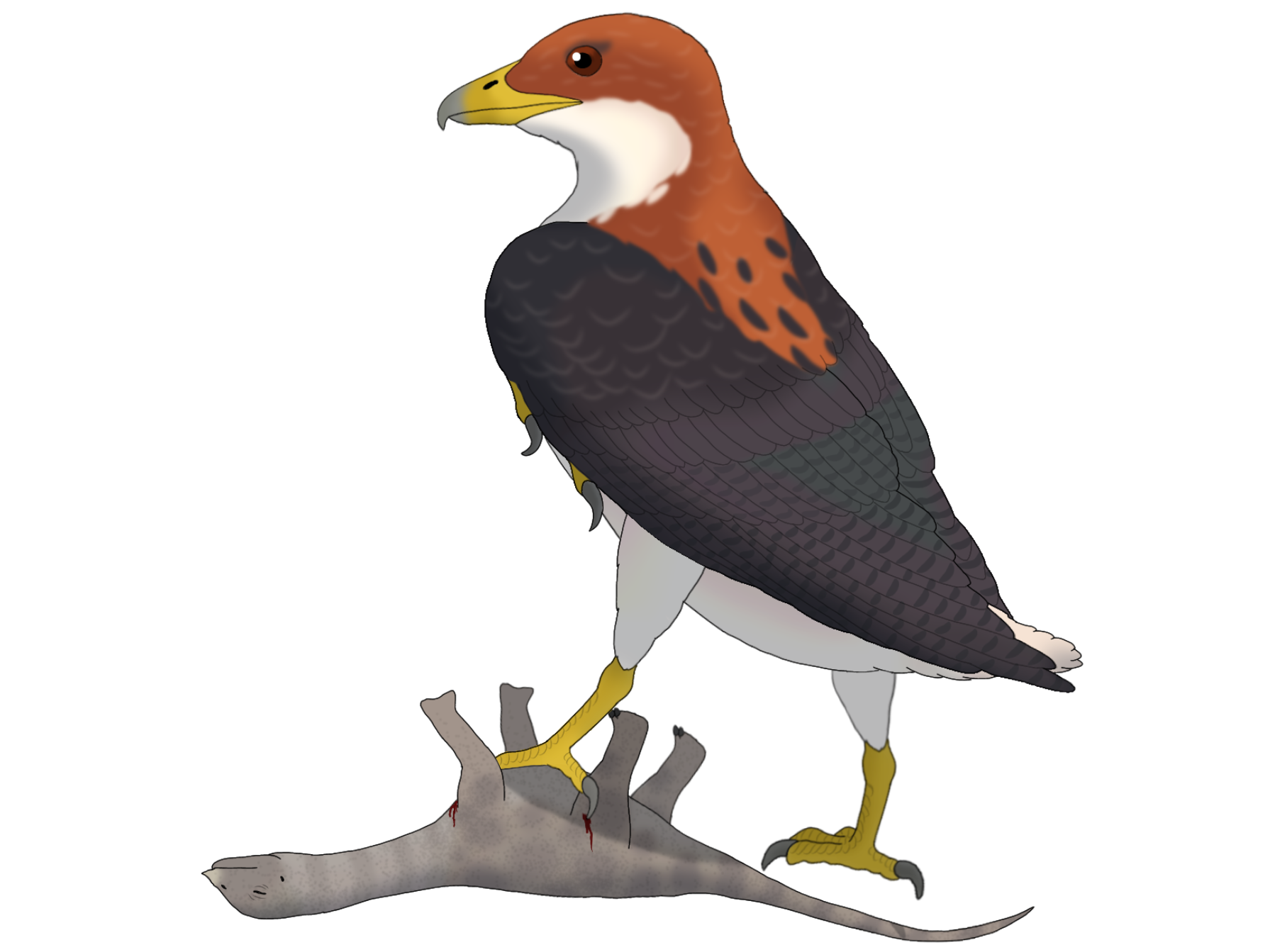
Life restoration of Soroavisaurus preying on a Saltasaurus hatchling

Based on its large size and strong talons, Soroavisaurus was likely a carnivore capable of perching, and has been hypothesized to occupy a similar ecological niche to extant birds of prey. A study published in 2024 found that the tarsometatarsi of members of the Avisauridae family (which Soroavisaurus belongs to) show adaptations forming an efficient lever system for carrying large prey while flying, which are also seen in various modern birds of prey. However, avisaurids show a variety of such adaptations, some of which are more similar to accipitrids (hawks and eagles) while others are closer to the condition in strigid owls. This suggests that while avisaurids were predatory, their exact ecological niche is not represented by any living bird of prey.

== Paleoenvironment ==
All known specimens of Soroavisaurus originate from exposures of the Lecho Formation at the locality of El Brete, which date back to the Maastrichtian age of the Cretaceous period. More specifically, the age of the Lecho Formation has been estimated to be between 71 and 69 million years, so its deposits would have formed during the start or middle of the Maastrichtian. Based on the type of sediment that these deposits are composed of, El Brete is believed to have been a coastal plain during that time, pockmarked with ponds and lagoons. In addition, the area would have been near the Tropic of Capricorn, giving it a humid and warm climate that supported coastal tropical forests.

Apart from Soroavisaurus, fossils of multiple other types of enantiornithine birds have been found at El Brete, which would have lived alongside it. These include genera named as Lectavis, Yungavolucris, Elbretornis, Enantiornis and Martinavis, though there has been some debate as to how many of these are truly distinct from each other. Apart from these birds, the only named animal genera known from the El Brete fossil assemblage are two types of dinosaur, namely the small theropod Noasaurus and the sauropod Saltasaurus. However, isolated teeth suggest the presence of at least one unnamed type of large, predatory abelisaurid. Other animals including lizards, crocodiles, turtles and fish were presumably also present in this environment, though remains of such animals have not been found at El Brete.
