= Luis M. Chiappe =

Argentine paleontologist (born 1962)

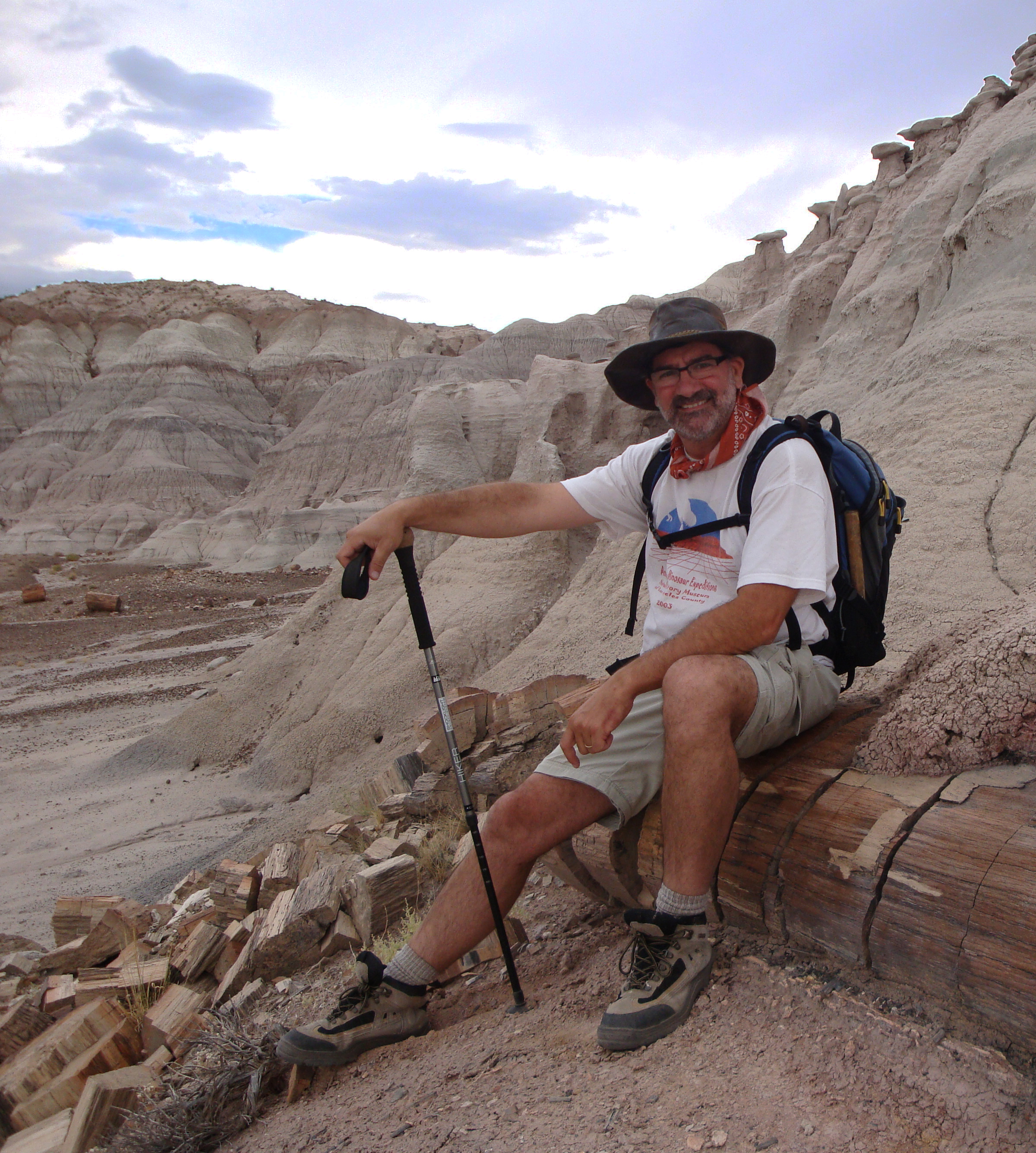
- Luis M. Chiappe in the field 2009
- Born: 18 June 1962 (age 64); Buenos Aires, Argentina
- Occupations: Paleontologist, Professor, Vice President of Research and Collections at the Natural History Museum of Los Angeles County, Author
- Scientific career
- Fields: Paleontology
- Workplaces: Natural History Museum of Los Angeles County
- Doctoral students: Jingmai O'Connor

Luis María Chiappe (born 18 June 1962) is an Argentine paleontologist born in Buenos Aires who is best known for his discovery of the first sauropod nesting sites in the badlands of Patagonia in 1997 and for his work on the origin and early evolution of Mesozoic birds. He has been the Senior Vice President of Research and Collections at the Natural History Museum of Los Angeles County since 2012 and was the founding director of the museum's Dinosaur Institute. He was a postdoctoral researcher at the American Museum of Natural History, New York after immigrating from Argentina. Chiappe curated the award-winning Dinosaur Hall at the Natural History Museum of Los Angeles County, and led the decade-long work on the green dinosaur Gnatalie which culminated with a new mount in the NHM Commons.

Chiappe is a fellow of the John Simon Guggenheim Memorial Foundation, a laureate of the Alexander Humboldt Foundation, a Fellow of the American Association for the Advancement of Science, an adjunct professor at the University of Southern California, and a member of the Real Academia de Ciencias de España.

== Academic contributions ==
Chiappe has published over 200 articles in peer-reviewed journals, with nearly 17,000 citations. He has numerous publications in high-profile scientific journals, including Nature, Science, Annual Review of Ecology and Systematics, Current Biology, Gondwana Research, PNAS, Nature Communications, Proceedings of the Royal Society B: Biological Sciences, and Scientific Reports. He is best known for his extensive work on the origin and early evolution of birds, although he is also well-known for work on sauropod nesting sites and embryos from Patagonia, on which he has authored several books and articles, and on pterosaur embryos.

Below is a list of taxa that Chiappe has contributed to naming:

| Year | Taxon | Authors |
|---|---|---|
| 2026 | Gorgonavis alcyone gen. et sp. nov. | Nebreda, Chiappe, Navalón, Terol, Serrano, Buscalioni, & Marugán-Lobón |
| 2025 | Shuilingornis angelai gen. et sp. nov. | Wang, Cau, Wang, Kundrát, Zhang, Liu, & Chiappe |
| 2024 | Navaornis hestiae gen. et sp. nov. | Chiappe, Navalón, Martinelli, de Souza Carvalho, Santucci, Wu, & Field |
| 2019 | Gretcheniao sinensis gen. et sp. nov. | Chiappe, Qingjin, Serrano, Sigurdsen, Min, Bell, & Di |
| 2019 | Elektorornis chenguangi gen. et sp. nov. | Xing, O'Connor, Chiappe, McKellar, Carroll, Hu, Bai, & Lei |
| 2019 | Orienantius ritteri gen. et sp.. nov. | Liu, Chiappe, Zhang, Serrano, & Meng |
| 2015 | Fumicollis hoffmani gen. et sp. nov. | Bell & Chiappe |
| 2014 | Gansus zheni sp. nov. | Liu, Chiappe, Zhang, Bell, Meng, Ji, & Wang |
| 2014 | Changyuraptor yangi gen. et sp. nov. | Han, Chiappe, Ji, Habib, Turner, Chinsamy, Liu, & Han |
| 2013 | Zhouornis hani sp. nov. | Zhang, Chiappe, Han, & Chinsamy |
| 2013 | Overosaurus paradasorum gen. et sp. nov. | Coria, Filippi, Chiappe, Garcia, & Arcucci |
| 2013 | Sulcavis geeorum, gen. et sp. nov. | O'Connor, Zhang, Chiappe, Meng, Quanguo, & Di |
| 2010 | Fruitadens haagarorum gen. et sp. nov. | Butler, Galton, Porro, Chiappe, Henderson, & Erickson |
| 2010 | Morsoravis sedilis gen. et sp. nov. | Bertelli, Lindow, Dyke, & Chiappe |
| 2010 | Shenqiornis mengi gen. et sp. nov. | Wang, O'Connor, Zhao, Chiappe, Gao, & Cheng |
| 2010 | Longicrusavis houi gen. et sp. nov. | O'Connor, Gao, & Chiappe |
| 2010 | Hollanda luceria gen. et sp. nov. | Bell, Chiappe, Erickson, Suzuki, Watabe, Barsbold, Tsogtbaatar |
| 2009 | Shanweiniao cooperorum gen. et sp. nov. | O'Connor, Wang, Chiappe, Gao, Meng, Cheng, & Liu |
| 2008 | Zhongornis haoae gen. et sp. nov. | Gao, Chiappe, Meng, O'Connor, Wang, Cheng, & Liu |
| 2007 | Kelenken guillermoi gen. et sp. nov. | Bertelli, Chiappe, & Tambussi |
| 2007 | Elsornis keni gen. et sp. nov. | Chiappe, Suzuki, Dyke, Watabe, Tsogtbaatar, & Barsbold |
| 2006 | Dalingheornis liweii gen. et sp. nov. | Zihui, Lianhai, Yoshikasu, O'Connor, Martin, & Chiappe |
| 2006 | Juravenator starki gen. et sp. nov. | Göhlich & Chiappe |
| 2002 | Aucasaurus garridoi gen. et sp. nov. | Coria, Chiappe, & Dingus |
| 2002 | Halimornis thompsoni gen. et sp. nov. | Chiappe, Lamb, & Ericson |
| 2001 | Limenavis patagonica gen. et sp. nov. | Clarke & Chiappe |
| 1999 | Changchengornis hengdaoziensis gen. et sp. nov. | Qiang, Chiappe, & Shu' An |
| 1998 | Shuvuuia deserti gen. et sp. nov. | Chiappe, Norell, & Clark |
| 1996 | Vorona berivotrensis gen. et sp. nov. | Forster, Chiappe, Krause, & Sampson |
| 1996 | Eoalulavis hoyasi gen. et sp. nov. | Sanz, Chiappe, Pérez-Moreno, Buscalioni, Moratalla, Ortega, & Poyato-Ariza |
| 1995 | Avisaurus gloriae sp. nov. | Varrichio & Chiappe |
| 1994 | Neuquenornis volans gen. et sp. nov. | Chiappe & Calvo |
| 1993 | Yungavolucris brevipedalis gen. et sp. nov. | Chiappe |
| 1993 | Soroavisaurus australis gen. et sp. nov. | Chiappe |
| 1993 | Lectavis brenticola gen. et sp. nov. | Chiappe |
| 1993 | Mononychus olecranus gen. et sp. nov. | Altangerel, Norell, Chiappe, & Clark |
| 1988 | Amargasuchus minor gen. et sp. nov. | Chiappe |
| 1988 | Caiman tremembensis sp. nov. | Chiappe |

=== Books ===
- Chiappe, L.M.; Qingjin, M. 2016. Birds of Stone. (Johns Hopkins University Press, 2016), ISBN 978-1421420240.
- Chiappe, L.M. 2007. Glorified Dinosaurs: The Origin and Early Evolution of Birds. (Wiley-Liss, 2007), ISBN 978-0471247234.
- Dingus, L.; Chiappe, L.M. The Tiniest Giants: Discovering Dinosaur Eggs (Doubleday Books, 1999), ISBN 0385326424.
- Chiappe, L.M.; Dingus, L. Walking on Eggs: The Astonishing Discovery of Thousands of Dinosaur Eggs in the Badlands of Patagonia (Scribner, 2001), ISBN 0-7432-1377-7.
- Chiappe, L.M.; Dingus, L. The Lost Dinosaurs: The Astonishing Discovery of the World's Largest Prehistoric Nesting Ground (Abacus, 2002), ISBN 0-3491-1351-3
- Chiappe, L.M.; Witmer L. Mesozoic Birds: Above the Heads of Dinosaurs (University of California Press, 2002), ISBN 0-520-20094-2.

== In popular culture ==
Chiappe has been featured in many TV documentaries, including the 2016 BBC documentary, Attenborough and the Giant Dinosaur, showing Sir David Attenborough the dinosaur egg nesting site at Auca Mahuevo, and eggs from that site in the Museo Carmen Funes in Plaza Huincul, Neuquén Province, Argentina.
