= Explorornis =

Explorornis Temporal range: Turonian, 90 Ma

Scientific classification
- Domain: Eukaryota
- Kingdom: Animalia
- Phylum: Chordata
- Clade: Dinosauria
- Clade: Saurischia
- Clade: Theropoda
- Clade: Avialae
- Clade: †Enantiornithes
- Clade: †Euenantiornithes
- Genus: †Explorornis; Panteleev, 1998

Type species
- †Explorornis nessovi Panteleev, 1998

Species
- †E. nessovi Panteleev, 1998; †E. walkeri (Nesov & Panteleev, 1993 [originally Enantiornis)

Extinct genus of birds

Explorornis ("discovered bird", from Latin explōrō "to discover" and Ancient Greek ornis (όρνις) "bird") is a genus of Mesozoic birds which lived during the mid-late Turonian stage, around 90 million years ago, in the Bissekty Formation of the Kyzyl Kum, in present-day Uzbekistan.

E. walkeri (specimen PO 4825) was originally placed in Enantiornis, but the description of the type species E. nessovi (PO 4819), showed that it was not congeneric with the South American Enantiornis, which makes far more sense considering biogeography and age. The two species are named after famous paleontologists: Lev Alexandrovich Nesov (1947–1995) and Alick Donald Walker.

These were all smallish birds, maybe 15–20 cm long in life, except E. walkeri which was probably more than 25 cm long.

Since only the coracoids are known, the phylogenetic position of these taxa is somewhat unresolved. While they do resemble the more advanced Enantiornithes more than they do any other bird, confirmation of their placement with Euenantiornithes would still require more material.
