= Incolornis =

Incolornis Temporal range: Late Cretaceous, 89–86 Ma

Scientific classification
- Domain: Eukaryota
- Kingdom: Animalia
- Phylum: Chordata
- Clade: Dinosauria
- Clade: Saurischia
- Clade: Theropoda
- Clade: Avialae
- Clade: †Enantiornithes
- Clade: †Euenantiornithes
- Genus: †Incolornis; Panteleev, 1998

Type species
- †Incolornis silvae Panteleev, 1998

Species
- †I. martini (Nessov & Panteleev, 1993 [originally Enantiornis); †I. silvae Panteleev, 1998

Extinct genus of birds

Incolornis (meaning "inhabitant bird") is an extinct genus of basal birds from the Late Cretaceous (Coniacian, 89–86 mya). Remains have been found in the Bissekty Formation in Uzbekistan. It is only known from fragmentary coracoids. The systematic position of the genus is unclear; it might have been an enantiornithine bird.

Two species are known, Incolonis silvae and Incolornis martini; the latter was initially placed in the genus Enantiornis. The estimated length of these animals was 135 mm for I. silvae and 220 mm for I. martini.
