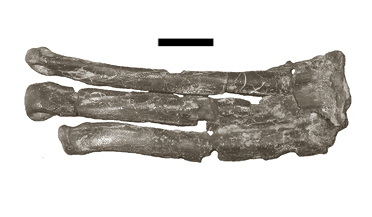
- Holotype right tarsometatarsus

Scientific classification
- Kingdom: Animalia
- Phylum: Chordata
- Class: Reptilia
- Clade: Dinosauria
- Clade: Saurischia
- Clade: Theropoda
- Clade: Avialae
- Clade: †Enantiornithes
- Family: †Avisauridae
- Genus: †Bauxitornis; Dyke & Ősi, 2010
- Species: †B. mindszentyae

Binomial name
- †Bauxitornis mindszentyae Dyke & Ősi, 2010

= Bauxitornis =

Bauxitornis Temporal range: Late Cretaceous, 85 Ma

Extinct genus of birds

Bauxitornis is an extinct genus of avisaurid enantiornithean birds which lived in what is now Hungary during the late Cretaceous period (Santonian age). Although first mentioned in a 2008 review of Hungarian Cretaceous bird fossils, it was named in a more comprehensive review by Gareth J. Dyke and Attila Ősi in 2010. The type species is Bauxitornis mindszentyae. The generic name "Bauxitornis" refers to the locality at which it was discovered, a Bauxite mine. The specific name "mindszentyae" honors Andrea Mindszenty, Ősi's advisor.

== Description ==
The holotype of Bauxitornis is MTV V 2009.31.1 (previously known as MTM Gyn/439), a right tarsometatarsus. At 51 mm (2 inches) in length, this bone indicates that Bauxitornis was a comparatively large enantiornithean similar to Soroavisaurus and Avisaurus.

In addition, several other traits support the placement of Bauxitornis as an avisaurid. The inside edge of the trochlea (toe joint) of metatarsal III (the middle preserved midfoot bone) possesses a small but noticeable bony tab (known as a plantar projection) which extends towards the underside of the ankle. Although the tarsometatarsus is mostly unfused, the proximal (near) parts of metatarsals II and III have fused together into a flat area that extends about a third the length of their shafts. The proximal end of the tarsometatarsus bends laterally (outwards).

However, Bauxitornis can be distinguished from these other enantiornitheans due to having a shortened metatarsal II (the innermost preserved midfoot bone) without a tubercule (scarred bump) for the M. tibialis cranialis muscle. In addition, Bauxitornis's longest metatarsal is metatarsal IV (the outermost midfoot bone) rather than metatarsal III.

== Classification ==
While usually thought to be an avisaurid enantiornithean, one study finds it to be a more basal avialan closely related to Balaur bondoc.
