= Dalingheornis =

Dalingheornis Temporal range: Aptian, 122 Ma

Scientific classification
- Kingdom: Animalia
- Phylum: Chordata
- Class: Reptilia
- Clade: Dinosauria
- Clade: Saurischia
- Clade: Theropoda
- Clade: Avialae
- Clade: †Enantiornithes
- Genus: †Dalingheornis; Zhang et al., 2006
- Species: †D. liweii

Binomial name
- †Dalingheornis liweii Zhang et al., 2006

Extinct genus of birds

Dalingheornis is a genus of enantiornithean birds which lived during the early Cretaceous period, about 122 Ma ago, and are known from a single juvenile fossil found in the upper part of the Yixian Formation at Dawangzhangzi, Liaoning province, People's Republic of China. It is the first known Mesozoic bird with heterodactyl feet specifically adapted for climbing, and was probably among the most arboreal of the enantiornitheans. Unlike its relatives, it had an unusually long (17mm) skeletal tail made up of 20 vertebrae, similar to the tails of dromaeosaurids. However, this may have been a juvenile feature. The fossil was named after Yang Liwei, the first Chinese astronaut in space.

== Description ==
Some sources have doubted the presence of heterodactyl feet in this genus. Lockley et al. (2007) found that its metatarsal II was not strongly curved inwards compared to other enantiornitheans, and they also noted that the supposed reversed second toe claw probably acquired that position after the animal died. In 2009, Jingmai O'Connor considered Dalingheornis to be a nomen dubium due to its remains being stored in a private collection. However, this proposal has been criticized by Mickey Mortimer, as Dalingheornis is a valid genus under ICZN guidelines despite its inaccessibility to paleontologists.
