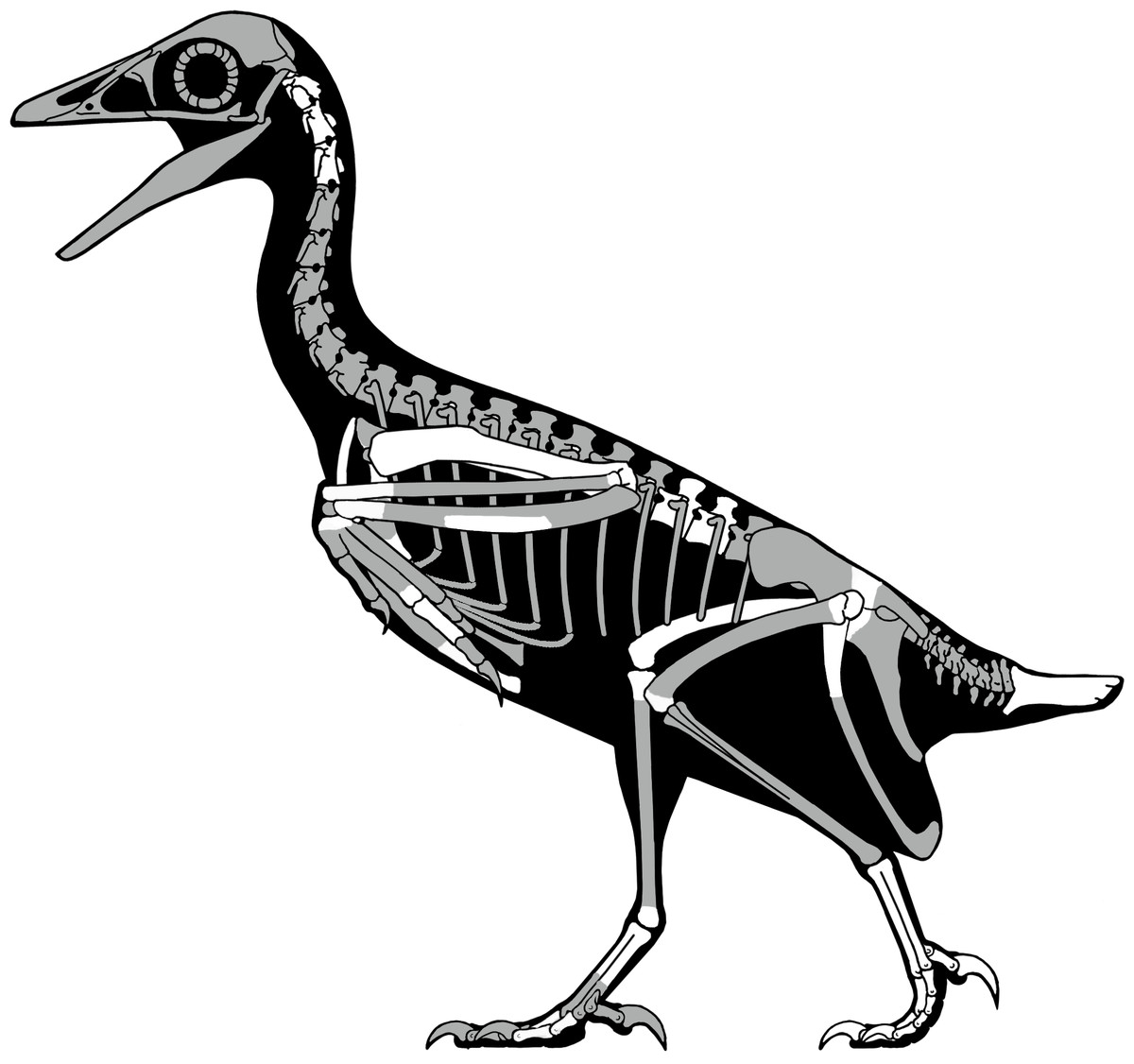
- Skeletal reconstruction of Mirarce

Scientific classification
- Kingdom: Animalia
- Phylum: Chordata
- Class: Reptilia
- Clade: Dinosauria
- Clade: Saurischia
- Clade: Theropoda
- Clade: Avialae
- Clade: †Enantiornithes
- Clade: †Euenantiornithes
- Family: †Avisauridae; Brett-Surman and Paul, 1985

Genera
- †Avisaurus; †Bauxitornis?; †Concornis?; †Enantiophoenix?; †Gettyia; †Halimornis?; †Intiornis; †Mirarce; †Mystiornis?; †Neuquenornis?; †Soroavisaurus

Synonyms
- Concornithidae? Kurochkin, 1996; Mystiornithidae Kurochkin et al., 2011

= Avisauridae =

Avisauridae Temporal range: Early-Late Cretaceous, 125–66 Ma

Extinct family of dinosaurs

Avisauridae is a family of extinct enantiornithine dinosaurs from the Cretaceous period, distinguished by several features of their ankle bones. Depending on the definition used, Avisauridae is either a broad and widespread group of advanced enantiornithines (following Cau & Arduini, 2008), or a small family within that group, restricted to species from the Late Cretaceous of North and South America (following Chiappe, 1992).

== Description ==
Avisaurids were among the largest and last enantiornithines to have lived, although they are also among the most poorly preserved. The majority of them are known primarily from fossilized tarsometatarsal bones, the part of a bird's leg formed by fused metatarsals (the bones which comprise the foot in humans). As a result, members of this family are distinguished from other enantiornithines exclusively by features of the tarsometatarsal and pedal phalanges (toe bones).

Unlike in some prehistoric birds, avisaurid tarsometatarsals were not completely fused, with the distal (outer) parts of the metatarsals being separate from each other. The proximal (near) half of metatarsal III (the long bone in the middle of the tarsometatarsus) is convex from the front. The inside edge of this bone's trochlea (toe joint) has a bony tab which points downward, known as a plantar projection. The innermost bone of the tarsometatarsus, metatarsal I, is small, laterally compressed (flattened from side-to-side), and J-shaped from the side. It is connected to a reversed hallux sporting a very large and curved claw.

Chiappe and Calvo (1994) found that the Avisauridae shared adaptations of the foot — including a fully reversed and distally placed hallux with a large claw — that indicated the ability to perch in trees. They argued that an arboreal habit was most likely for all of the Avisauridae. Their large size and tarso-metatarsus anatomy also indicate that they occupied a niche similar to modern birds of prey.

== History and classification ==
Avisauridae was erected as a family by Michael Brett-Surman and Gregory S. Paul in 1985. At that time the family consisted of a few fossils that they believed belonged to small non-avian dinosaurs. They doubted that these fossils belonged to birds due to the presence of several features of the tarsometatarsus. In Avisaurus (the only avisaurid known at that time), only the proximal parts of the metatarsals were fused, the proximal part of metatarsal III was wide, and the hypotarsus (a wide ridge extending down the back of the tarsometatarsus) was poorly developed.

However, Chiappe later reassigned the Avisauridae to the class Aves (which is equivalent to the clade Avialae in modern usage) and the subclass Enantiornithes in 1992. He noted that the features used to exclude avisaurids from birds are in fact present in some early birds such as Archaeopteryx, as well as various Cretaceous bird groups. Avisaurids also had a thin metatarsal IV (the outermost long bone of the tarsometatarsus) and a bony knob on the front of metatarsal II (the most innermost long bone of the tarsometatarsus) for the insertion of M. tibialis cranialis (the muscle which flexes the ankle, also known as the M. tibialis anticus or M. tibialis anterior), both believed to be enantiornithean features.

Chiappe in 1993 defined the family as the common ancestor of Neuquenornis volans and Avisaurus archibaldi plus all its descendants. In 2008, the family was given a broader definition courtesy of Cau and Arduini. They redefined the group as Avisaurus archibaldi and all genera more closely related to it than to either Longipteryx, Gobipteryx or Sinornis. Matt Martyniuk gave the name Avisauroidea to this group, although the erection of that name has been criticized by Cau. Under this broader definition, several other enantiornitheans, such as Enantiophoenix, would qualify as members of the family. Nevertheless, enantiornithean taxonomy is notably difficult to resolve, and some analyses on enantiornitheans have not resolved the family. However, this may be due to such analyses focusing on early Cretaceous enantiornitheans (which are numerous and well-preserved) rather than fragmentary late Cretaceous taxa, such as most avisaurids. Another member of Avisauridae is, Elsornis, due to its pectoral skeleton, it's likely that it could not fly, however, it may have glided like the Archaeopteryx.

The following is a cladogram based on Cau and Arduini (2008):

- - Sinornis
  - Avisauridae
    - Enantiophoenix
    - - Halimornis
      - - Concornis
        - - Neuquenornis
          - - Avisaurus
            - Soroavisaurus

A 2024 study reduces the group to just six taxa: MOR 3070, Soroavisaurus, two Avisaurus species, Mirarce and Gettyia.
