= Gettyia =

Gettyia Temporal range: Late Cretaceous, 75–74 Ma

Scientific classification
- Kingdom: Animalia
- Phylum: Chordata
- Class: Reptilia
- Clade: Dinosauria
- Clade: Saurischia
- Clade: Theropoda
- Clade: Avialae
- Clade: †Enantiornithes
- Family: †Avisauridae
- Genus: †Gettyia; Atterholt, Hutchinson, and O'Connor, 2018

Type species
- †Gettyia gloriae Atterholtt, Hutchinson, and O'Connor, 2018

Synonyms
- Avisaurus gloriae Varrichio and Chiappe, 1995

Extinct genus of birds

Gettyia is an extinct genus of avisaurid enantiornithean bird from the Late Cretaceous of North America.

== Description ==
Gettyia is known from a single right tarsometatarsus. This bone was similar to that of other North American avisaurids such as Avisaurus and Mirarce, but it was much smaller. The second metatarsal had a tubercule (knob-like structure) on its front edge, which likely connected to the tibialis cranialis muscle which flexes the ankle. Other avisaurids typically had this tubercule located midway on the shaft of the metatarsal, or closer to the ankle than the toes. Gettyia, on the other hand, had its tibialis cranialis tubercule located more than halfway down the shaft. The third and fourth metatarsals are more extensively fused than in other avisaurids, as fusion occurs not only near the ankle, but also near the toes.

== Paleobiology ==
The more distally placed tibialis cranialis tubercule of Gettyia suggests that it had a more specialized lifestyle compared to other avisaurids. Zeffer & Norberg (2003) have found that living birds with a distally placed tibialis cranialis tubercules were biomechanically inclined to emphasize force of flexion, rather than speed. Birds of prey in particular utilize forceful flexion during their hunting behavior. Arboreal parrots and other climbing birds also make use of forceful flexion to obtain stability while foraging or hanging from tree branches. More terrestrial birds typically need more speed and less force, to assist locomotion like walking and hopping.

== Paleoecology ==
Gettyia is known from the humid low-lying swamps, lakes, and river basins of the western shore of the Western Interior Seaway, and from the much more arid uplands between that area and the Cordilleran Overthrust Belt which eventually formed the Rocky Mountains.

== Classification ==
Gettyia was originally named Avisaurus gloriae by Varrichio and Chiappe (1995) for MOR 553E/6.19.91.64, a tarsometatarsus from the late Campanian Upper Two Medicine Formation of Glacier County, Montana, USA. The species name honors Gloria Siebrecht, a volunteer fossil collector at the Museum of the Rockies who discovered the specimen. A new partial skeleton of an enantiornithean that would come to be known as Mirarce prompted Atterholt et al. (2018) to re-evaluate avisaurid taxonomy. They found that Mirarce was intermediate between "Avisaurus" gloriae and Avisaurus archibaldi, showing that the two "Avisaurus" species were not actually members of a single monophyletic genus. To solve this problem, they created the genus name Gettyia for Avisaurus gloriae, honoring the late Mike Getty.
