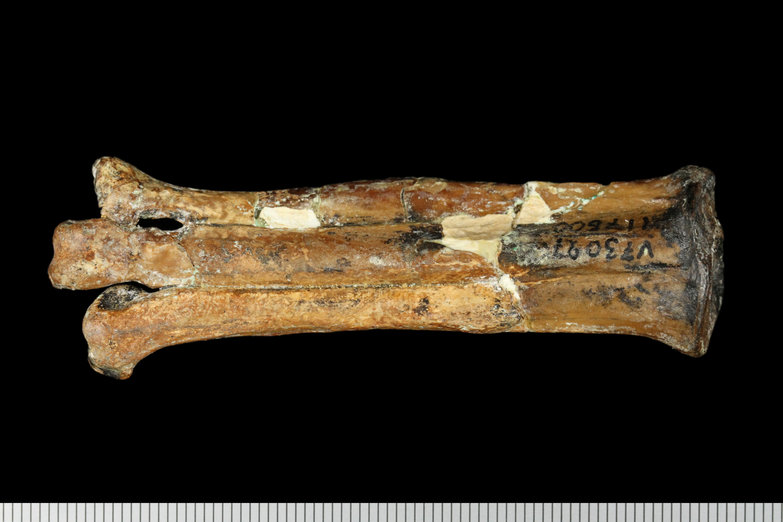
- Holotype tarsometatarsus of A. archibaldi

Scientific classification
- Kingdom: Animalia
- Phylum: Chordata
- Class: Reptilia
- Clade: Dinosauria
- Clade: Saurischia
- Clade: Theropoda
- Clade: Avialae
- Clade: †Enantiornithes
- Family: †Avisauridae
- Genus: †Avisaurus; Brett-Surman & Paul, 1985

Type species
- †Avisaurus archibaldi Brett-Surman & Paul, 1985

Species
- †A. archibaldi Brett-Surman and Paul, 1985 (type); †A. darwini Clark et al., 2024

= Avisaurus =

Avisaurus Temporal range: Late Cretaceous (Maastrichtian), 68–66 Ma

Extinct genus of birds

Avisaurus (meaning "bird lizard") is a genus of enantiornithine avialan from the Late Cretaceous of North America.

== Discovery ==
Avisaurus archibaldi was discovered in the Late Cretaceous Hell Creek Formation of North America (Maastrichtian, from c.70.6–66 million years ago), making it one of the last enantiornithines. It was collected in 1975 in the UCMP locality V73097, in Garfield County, Montana, USA. The holotype is represented by a single fossil of a tarsometatarsus in the collection of the University of California Museum of Paleontology. It has the catalog number UCMP 117600. The species name honors J. David Archibald, its discoverer, from The University of California, Berkeley. It was initially described as the left tarsometatarsus of a non-avian theropod by Brett-Surman and Paul in 1985. It was later redescribed as the right tarsometatarsus of an enantiornithine bird by Chiappe in 1992.

Avisaurus gloriae Varricchio and Chiappe 1995, discovered in the late Campanian Upper Two Medicine Formation of Glacier County, Montana, USA, was renamed Gettyia by Atterholt et al. (2018). In 2024, another species of Avisaurus from the Hell Creek Formation was named as Avisaurus darwini, with the specific name in honor of Charles Darwin.

== Description ==
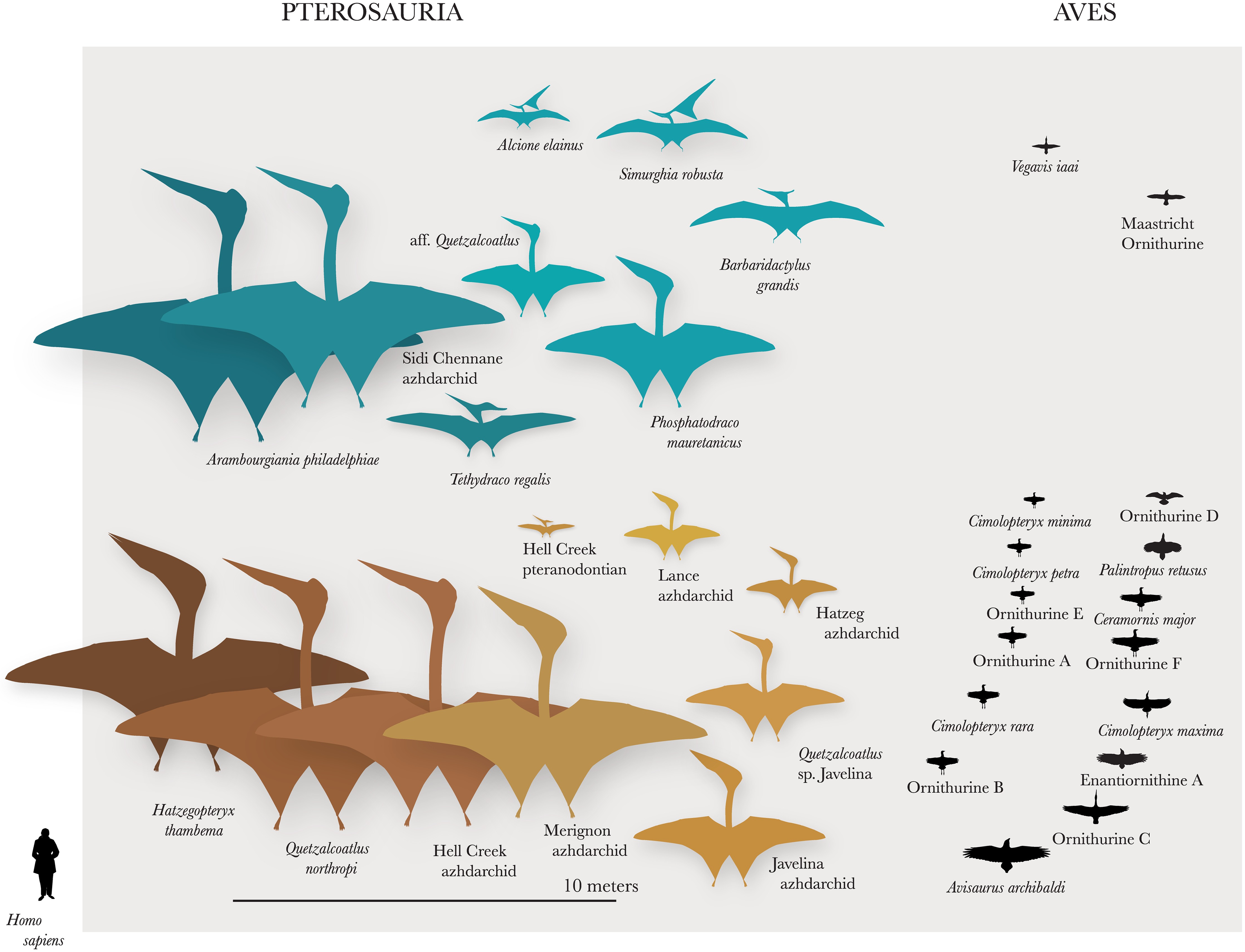
Size (lower right) compared to contemporary birds, pterosaurs, and a human

Avisaurus was a large enantiornithine, with A. darwini weighing up to 1.2 kilograms (2.6 lb) and A. archibaldi weighing up to 1.7 kilograms (3.7 lb). The type specimen of A. archibaldi has a maximum length of 73.9 mm (2.91 in), making it one of the largest known tarsometatarsi of an enantiornithine.

== Classification ==
This genus belongs to the enantiornithine family Avisauridae, which also contains similar animals from South America such as Soroavisaurus, Neuquenornis and Intiornis.

Brett-Surman and Paul (1985) explicitly considered the possibility that A. archibaldi was an enantiornithine. The authors described and named UCMP 117600 formally, but they looked at other enantiornithine material, including the "metatarsus" PVL 4690 from Argentina. The authors assigned this latter fossil to Avisaurus sp. From this they concluded that members of the genus Avisaurus existed in both North and South America in the Late Cretaceous. Moreover, the authors concluded that the length/width ratio and degree of metacarpal fusion of these bones were more like those of non — avian dinosaurs. A terrestrial dinosaur genus in both continents would then support Brett — Surman's theory that there had been a land connection between the two continents.

Further discoveries and further study by Chiappe showed that all of the material belonged to enantiornithine birds, and PVL 4690 was given its own genus Soroavisaurus.

== Paleoenvironment and paleobiology ==
Avisaurus remains fossilized in the humid low-lying swamps, lakes, and river basins of the western shore of the Western Interior Seaway, Hell Creek Formation.

Inwardly curved claws of the Avisaurus tarsis resemble those of eudromaeosaurs, indicating that it was predatory. It likely preyed on other vertebrates, with similarity to some modern raptors.

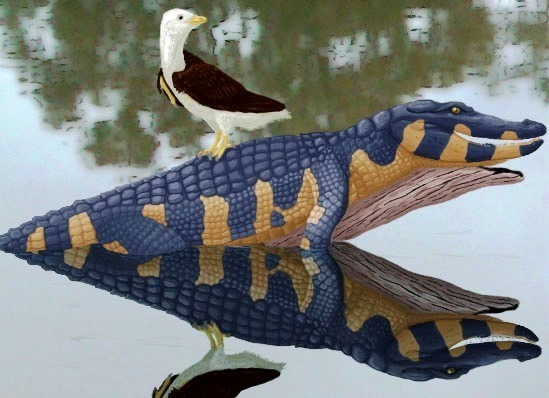
Reconstruction of Avisaurus and Brachychampsa

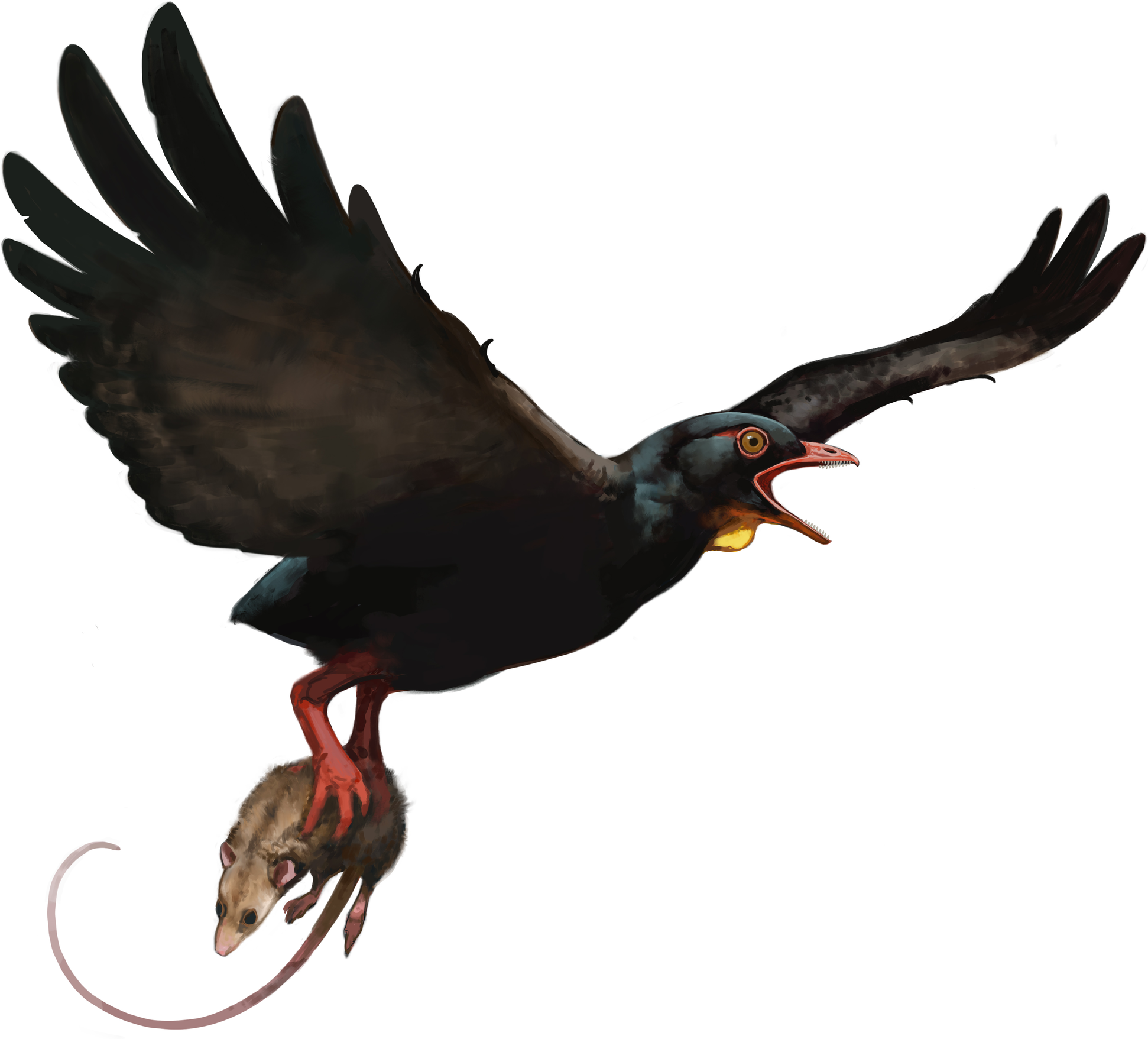
Reconstruction of Avisaurus darwini with prey
