= Enantiophoenix =

Enantiophoenix Temporal range: Late Cretaceous, 95 Ma

Scientific classification
- Kingdom: Animalia
- Phylum: Chordata
- Class: Reptilia
- Clade: Dinosauria
- Clade: Saurischia
- Clade: Theropoda
- Clade: Avialae
- Clade: †Enantiornithes
- Family: †Avisauridae
- Genus: †Enantiophoenix; Cau & Arduini, 2008
- Species: †E. electrophyla

Binomial name
- †Enantiophoenix electrophyla Cau & Arduini, 2008

Extinct genus of enantiornithean birds

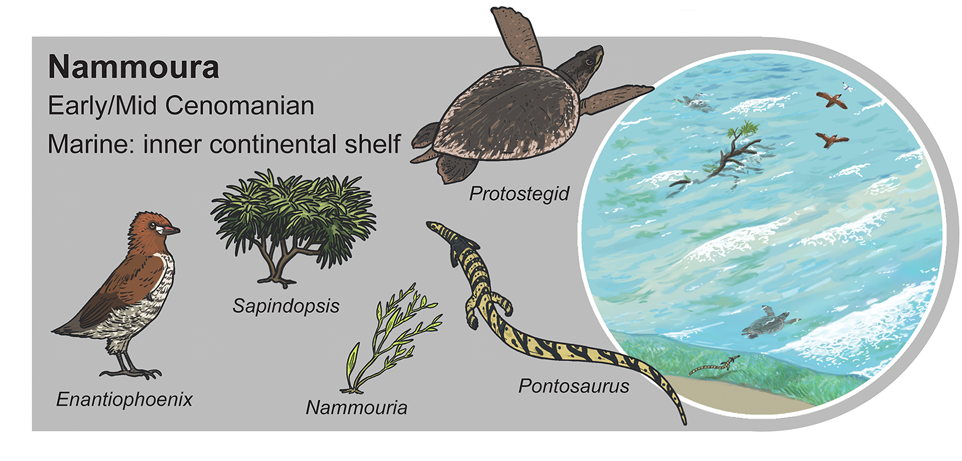
Flora, fauna and depositional environment of the Nammoura locality, including Enantiophoenix

Enantiophoenix is an extinct genus of enantiornithean birds known from fossil remains recovered from the Sannine Formation of Lebanon. Lumps of amber preserved with one specimen indicate it may have fed on tree sap.
