= Pterygornis =

Pterygornis Temporal range: Aptian

Scientific classification
- Kingdom: Animalia
- Phylum: Chordata
- Class: Reptilia
- Clade: Dinosauria
- Clade: Saurischia
- Clade: Theropoda
- Clade: Avialae
- Clade: †Enantiornithes
- Genus: †Pterygornis
- Species: †P. dapingfangensis

Binomial name
- †Pterygornis dapingfangensis Wang et al., 2016

Extinct genus of theropod dinosaur

Pterygornis is an extinct monotypic genus of enantiornithean dinosaur that lived in East Asia during the Aptian stage of the Early Cretaceous epoch.

== Etymology ==
The generic name Pterygornis is derived from the Latin word ‘pteryg’, meaning wing, and the Ancient Greek word ‘ornis’, meaning bird. The specific epithet of the type species, Pterygornis dapingfangensis, is derived from the town of Dapingfang, where its fossils were found.
