= Huoshanornis =

Huoshanornis Temporal range: Early Cretaceous, 120 Ma

Scientific classification
- Domain: Eukaryota
- Kingdom: Animalia
- Phylum: Chordata
- Clade: Dinosauria
- Clade: Saurischia
- Clade: Theropoda
- Clade: Avialae
- Clade: †Enantiornithes
- Genus: †Huoshanornis; Wang et al., 2010
- Species: †H. huji

Binomial name
- †Huoshanornis huji Wang et al., 2010

Extinct genus of birds

Huoshanornis is a genus of enantiornithine birds which existed in what is now Jiufotang Formation of Western Liaoning Province, China during the early Cretaceous period. Its fossil remains were found at Chaoyang City. It was first named by Xia Wang, Zihui Zhang, Chunling Gao, Lianhai Hou, Qingjin Meng and Jinyuan Liu in 2010 and the type species is Huoshanornis huji.
