= Musivavis =

Musivavis Temporal range: Early Cretaceous, (Aptian), 122–118.9 Ma

Scientific classification
- Kingdom: Animalia
- Phylum: Chordata
- Class: Reptilia
- Clade: Dinosauria
- Clade: Saurischia
- Clade: Theropoda
- Clade: Avialae
- Clade: †Enantiornithes
- Clade: †Euenantiornithes
- Genus: †Musivavis; Wang et al., 2022
- Species: †M. amabilis

Binomial name
- †Musivavis amabilis Wang et al., 2022

Extinct genus of birds

Musivavis (meaning "mosaic bird") is a genus of euenantiornithean bird from the Early Cretaceous (Aptian) Jiufotang Formation of Liaoning Province, China. The genus contains a single species, Musivavis amabilis, known from a nearly complete, articulated skeleton.

== Discovery and naming ==
The Musivavis holotype specimen, MHGU-3000, was discovered in a layer of the Jiufotang Formation of Chaoyang, Liaoning Province, China. This specimen consists of a nearly complete specimen, preserved on a single slab.

In 2022, Wang et al. described Musivavis amabilis, a new genus and species of enantiornthine, based on these fossil remains. The generic name, "Musivavis", combines the Latin "musivum", meaning "mosaic", and "avis", meaning "bird". The specific name, "amabilis", is a Latin word meaning "lovely" or "beautiful", in reference to the preservation quality of the holotype.

== See also ==
- List of bird species described in the 2020s
