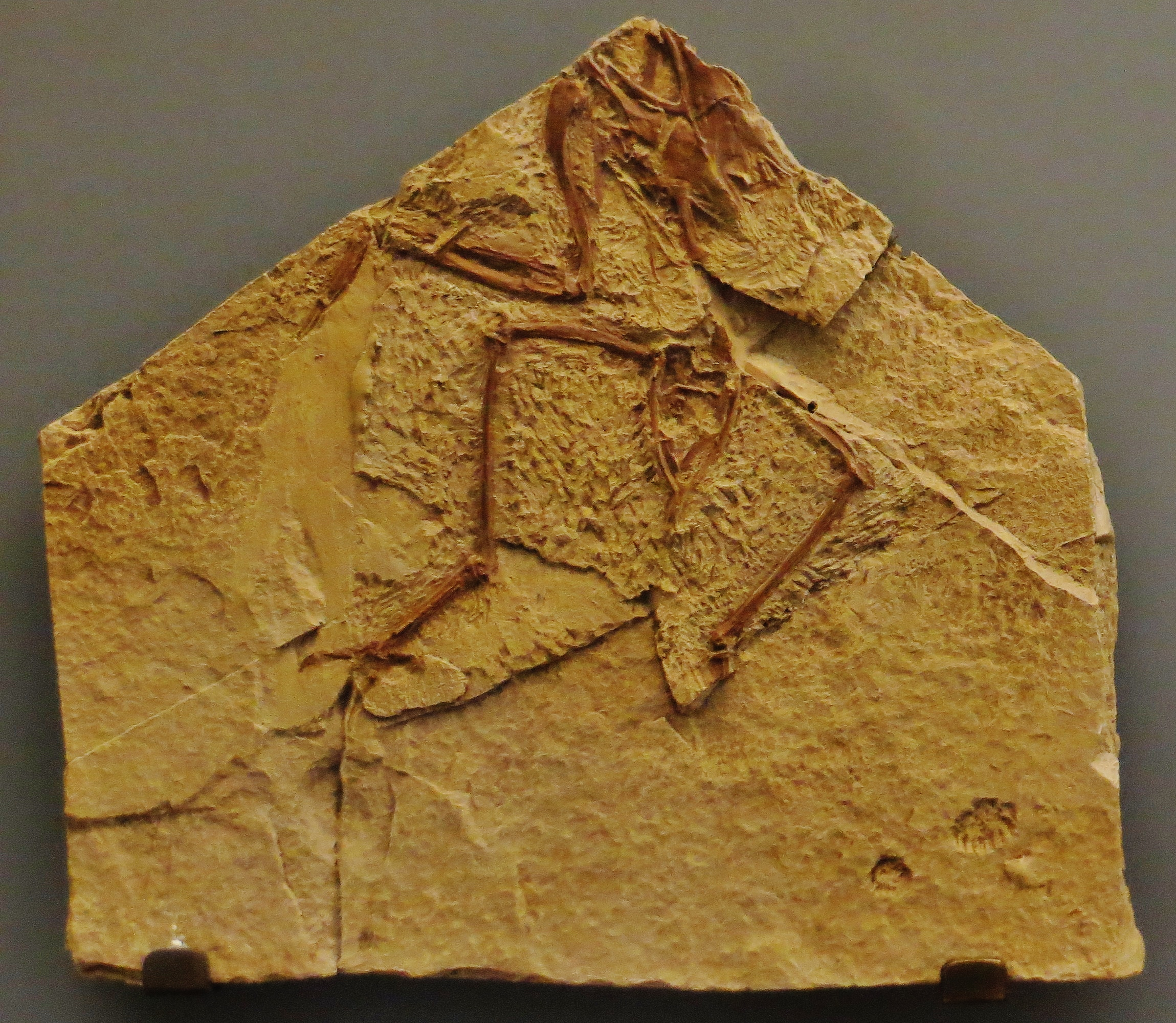
- Fossil cast

Scientific classification
- Kingdom: Animalia
- Phylum: Chordata
- Class: Reptilia
- Clade: Dinosauria
- Clade: Saurischia
- Clade: Theropoda
- Clade: Avialae
- Clade: †Enantiornithes
- Family: †Avisauridae
- Genus: †Concornis; Sanz & Buscalioni, 1992
- Species: †C. lacustris

Binomial name
- †Concornis lacustris Sanz & Buscalioni, 1992

= Concornis =

Concornis Temporal range: Early Cretaceous, 125 Ma

Extinct genus of birds

Concornis is a genus of enantiornithean birds which lived during the early Cretaceous period, in the late Barremian age about 125 million years ago. Its remains are known from the Calizas de La Huérgina Formation at Las Hoyas, Cuenca province, Spain. The single known species, Concornis lacustris, was described from the remains of one fairly complete individual skeleton.

== Description ==
The holotype of Concornis, MCCM-LH-1184 (also known as LH-2814) was initially described in 1992, while the specimen was still partially covered in sandstone. This preliminary description was published to record an aspect of the specimen which would be erased upon further preparation: faint traces of wing feathers visible under ultraviolet light. Once the specimen was prepared, most of these traces were destroyed but in return the skeleton was able to be studied in closer detail. A large redescription was published in 1995 once further preparation concluded. The specimen is almost complete, only missing a few elements such as the skull, neck, and pygostyle.

Concornis was an averaged sized enantiornithean, with an estimated wingspan of 34 centimeters (13 inches) and an estimated weight of about 70 g (2.5 oz). This would have made it proportionally similar to a common starling (Sturnus vulgaris). Its skull is unknown, but it almost certainly retained teeth in a snout (as in most other enantiornitheans) rather than a beak. It was probably an accomplished flyer for its time, though perhaps not as nimble and somewhat lacking in stamina compared to modern birds. It is not known whether it had an alula, although it is likely as such a feature is present in other enantiornitheans such as Eoalulavis. Inferring from the features of other enantiornitheans, Concornis also likely possessed a long, narrow pygostyle which connected to a single pair of ribbon-like tail feathers, rather than a fan-like tail of pennaceous feathers as in modern birds. The legs were fairly long and neither dedicated to perching on branches nor to running on the ground; it had a large hallux as is generally absent in terrestrial birds.

== Classification ==
Upon its initial description it was believed to be more primitive than Enantiornithes; In 1992, this group was poorly known and, as the primitive Iberomesornis was not yet considered to belong there either, contained only very advanced taxa. A wave of Chinese paleontological discoveries in the mid 1990s led to the group becoming much more well known, and the placement of C. lacustris within it was eventually verified. In fact, despite its early age, C. lacustris seems to be a fairly derived member of Enantiornithes.

A relationship with Sinornis and Cathayornis has been suggested mainly based on a peculiarly autapomorphic sternum. There is a keel that is Y-shaped and small compared to that of modern birds. The end of the sternum also bears deep notches.

A 2008 analysis placed Concornis in the family Avisauridae due to several features of the tibiotarsus (shinbone and upper ankle bones). Under this classification, Concornis is the oldest (and the most complete) member of the family.

== Paleoecology ==
The habitat and habits of Concornis lacustris are by and large conjectural. Its legs and flight apparatus suggest it was a truly multifunctional generalist bird able to bound through vegetation, run on the ground, and fly equally well. Compared to living birds adapted to each of these ecological niches, it would have certainly been inferior. It was found in an aquatic environment, suggesting it occupied at least partly a "shorebird" niche, and given its size would presumably have fed on small invertebrates like insects or crustaceans. There were terrestrial predators around in its habitat - including its non-avialan theropod relatives and crocodilians - from which Concornis would have found it far easier to fly up to some branch rather than to run away.

A 2018 study analyzed the proportions of Concornis and Eoalulavis (a contemporary enantiornithean) to determine the optimal flight pattern for those genera. The study found that they likely engaged in bounding flight, a form of flight popular among modern small and short-winged birds. A bird engaging in bounding flight alternates between upward-thrusting flaps and short dives with folded wings. The study also found that they were capable of continuous flapping flight, but were likely unable to glide due to having a high body mass to wingspan ratio. The study concluded that Eolalulavis, Concornis, and likely many other enantiornitheans alternated between the fast bounding flight and the slower but more efficient flapping flight depending on the circumstances, similar to modern songbirds and woodpeckers.
