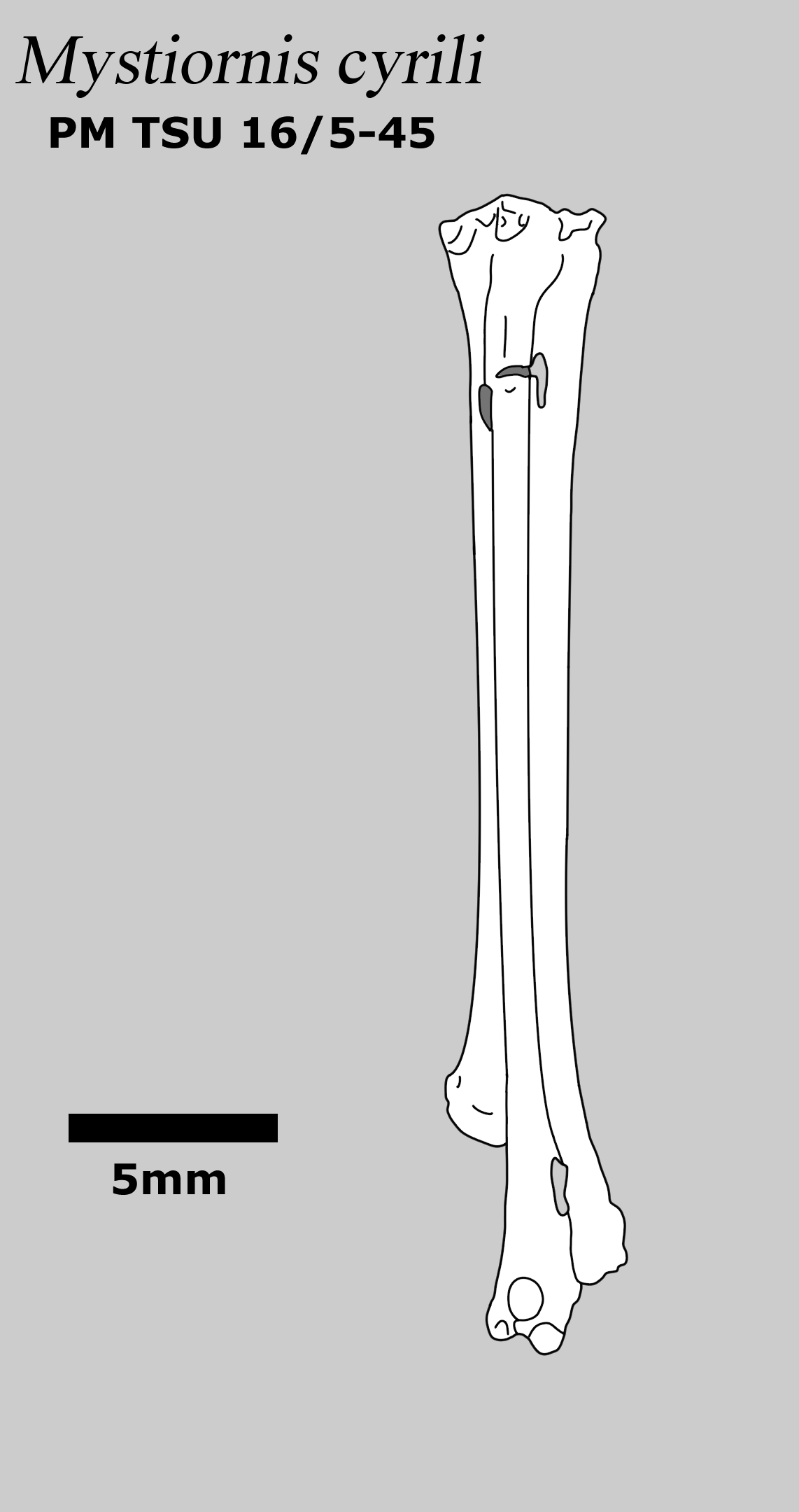

Scientific classification
- Kingdom: Animalia
- Phylum: Chordata
- Class: Reptilia
- Clade: Dinosauria
- Clade: Saurischia
- Clade: Theropoda
- Clade: Avialae
- Clade: †Enantiornithes
- Family: †Avisauridae
- Genus: †Mystiornis; Kurochkin et al., 2011
- Species: †M. cyrili

Binomial name
- †Mystiornis cyrili Kurochkin et al., 2011

= Mystiornis =

Mystiornis Temporal range: 125 Ma

Extinct genus of birds

Mystiornis is an extinct genus of bird which existed in what is now western Siberia, Russia during the early Cretaceous period (Barremian/Aptian age). It is known from an isolated metatarsus found in the Shestakovo-1 locality of southern Western Siberia. It was named by Evgeny N. Kurochkin, Nikita V. Zelenkov, Alexandr O. Averianov and Sergei V. Leshchinskiy in 2011, and the type species is Mystiornis cyrili. While most recent studies place it as an enantiornithean, specifically an avisaurid, the authors note that the placement in both groups is tentative and further material will be required to make a firm decision on placement due to the unusual features of the existing material.

Based on the strongly shortened metatarsal II and orientation of throchleae, Mystiornis had diving adaptations similar to that of Gansus and Neogaeornis. It was the size of a thrush.
