= Tarsometatarsus =

Bird bone

Pigeon skeleton. Number 8 indicates both left and right tarsometatarsus

The tarsometatarsus (tarsus singular, tarsi plural) is a bone that is only found in the lower leg of birds and some non-avian dinosaurs. It is formed from the fusion of several bird bones found in other types of animals, and homologous to the mammalian tarsus (ankle bones) and metatarsal bones (foot). Despite this, the tarsometatarsus of flying types is often referred to as just the shank, tarsus or metatarsus.

Tarsometatarsal fusion occurred in several ways and extents throughout bird evolution. Particularly, in Neornithes (modern birds), although the bones are joined along their entire length, the fusion is most thorough at the distal (metatarsal) end. In the Enantiornithes, a group of Mesozoic avialans, the fusion was complete at the proximal (tarsal) end, but the distal metatarsi were still partially distinct.

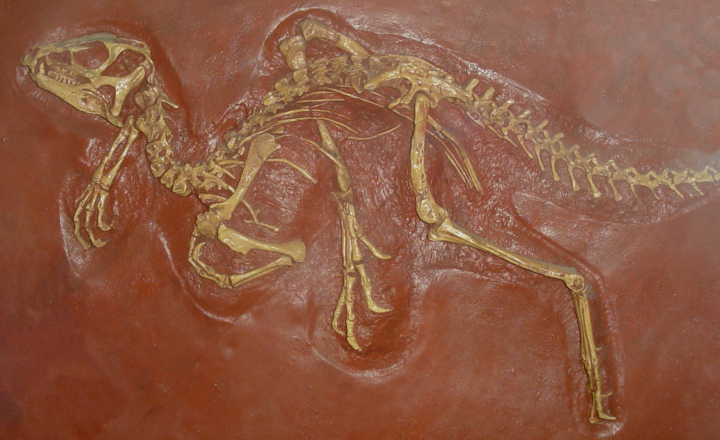
Cast of the type specimen of Heterodontosaurus tucki. Left tarsometatarsus is clearly visible.

While these fused bones are best known from birds and their relatives, avians are neither the only group nor the first to possess tarsometatarsi. In a remarkable case of parallel evolution, they were also present in the Heterodontosauridae, a group of tiny ornithischian dinosaurs quite distantly related to birds. The oldest remains of this taxon date from the Late Triassic more than 200 million years ago, and predate the first birds with tarsometatarsi by nearly 100 million years.

== See also ==
- Tarsometatarsal joints, a joint (not a bone) in the human foot
- Carpometacarpus, a similarly fused bone in bird hands
