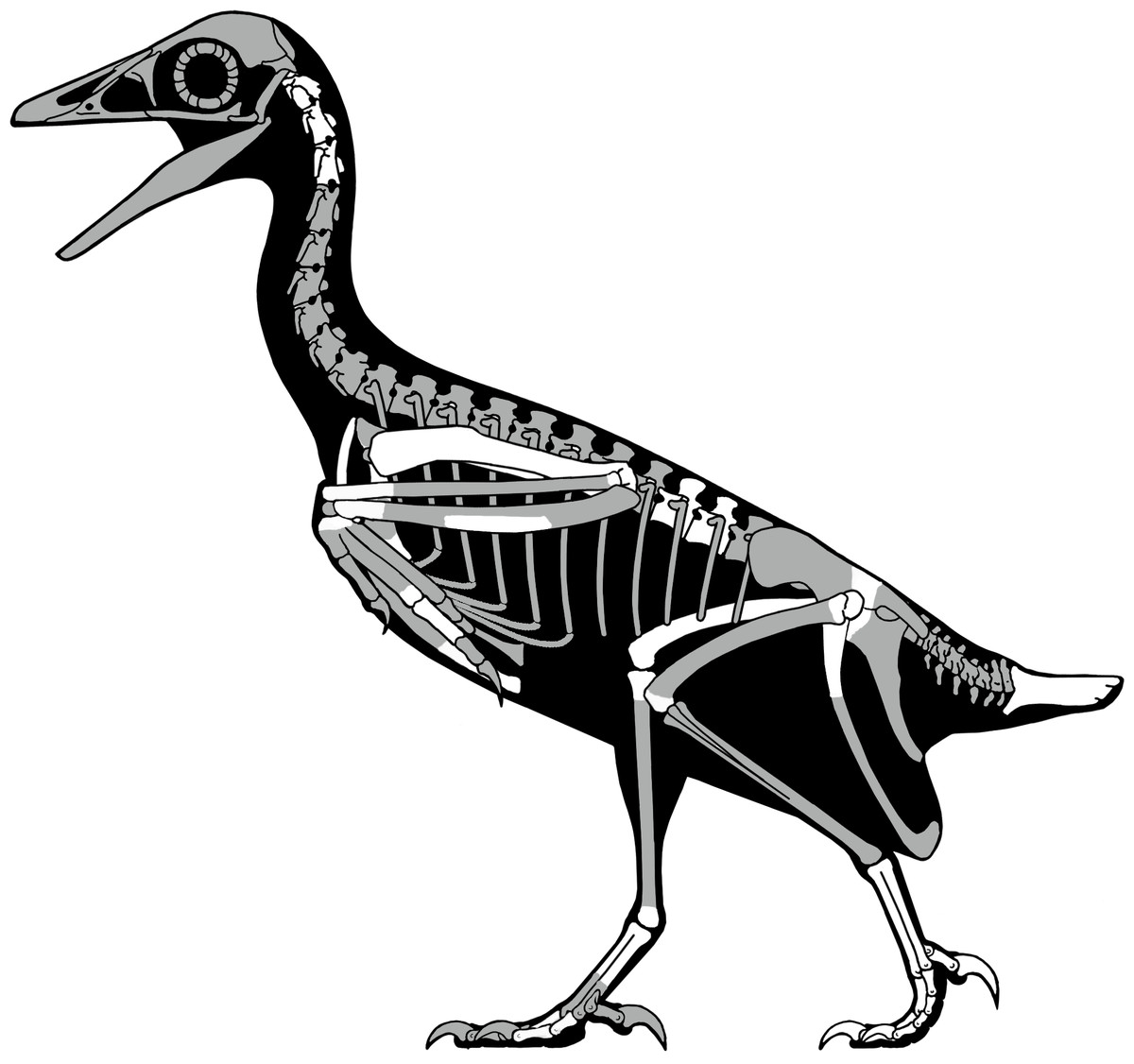
- Reconstruction by Scott Hartman, showing known material in white

Scientific classification
- Kingdom: Animalia
- Phylum: Chordata
- Class: Reptilia
- Clade: Dinosauria
- Clade: Saurischia
- Clade: Theropoda
- Clade: Avialae
- Clade: †Enantiornithes
- Family: †Avisauridae
- Genus: †Mirarce; Atterholt et al., 2018
- Species: †M. eatoni

Binomial name
- †Mirarce eatoni Atterholt et al., 2018

= Mirarce =

Mirarce Temporal range: Campanian, 76–74.1 Ma

Extinct genus of birds

Mirarce (meaning "wonderful winged messenger") is a genus of enantornithe bird from the Late Cretaceous of Utah. It contains a single species, M. eatoni. It was similar in size to modern Turkey vultures.

== Discovery ==
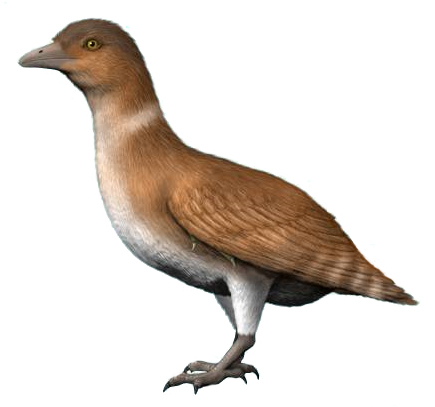
Life reconstruction

In 1992, in Utah, USA, paleontologist Howard Hutchison discovered fossilized remains of an enantiornithine bird. For a long time they have not been described; they were sometimes figured under the unofficial name of "Kaiparowits enantiornithine". The holotype, UCMP 139500, is well preserved in three dimensions. It consists of a partial postcranial skeleton without a skull, including 3 cervical and 2 thoracic vertebrae, a pygostyle, a furcula, the xiphoid process of the sternum, a fragment of the left scapula and a coracoid, the humerus, ulna, and radius with fragments of the manus, several fused fragments of the pelvic girdle, and some elements of the hind limbs. It is the most complete enantiornithine found in North America.

In 2018, the fossil was named and described by a group of paleontologists led by Jesse Atterholt, who learned of the specimens existence in 2009 and asked to reseasrch it. The generic name is made up of the Latin mirus; beautiful, "for an impressive level of preservation and morphological details," with the addition of the name of Arke ( Ἄρκη \ Arkē ), the winged messenger of the Titans of Greek mythology - "for evidence pointing to an improved vehicle of this kind." The species name eatoni given in honor of Jeffrey Eaton in recognition of the decades of scientific work done on the Kaiparowits formation and the study of its fossil specimens.

== Description ==
Mirarce eatoni was a large turkey vulture-sized bird. It grew to be around two feet tall. Skeletal morphology indicates that at the time of death, the individual was adult. All the surviving elements of the bones show complete fusion.

The bones of the forelimbs deserve special attention. The humerus of the bird is short and strong. The left ulna was preserved as a mineral cast of the internal cavity with several small fragments of fossilized bone surface. Two folded spots preserved on the posterior edge of the bone body are interpreted as quill knobs. These elongated folds are located along the length of the bone. Despite the fact that bone fragments do not allow measuring the size of each tubercle, determining the distance between them or estimating the number of secondary feathers, their very presence on the fossil is a very significant fact, as this is the first time the structure has been found in enantiornithines.

== Phylogeny ==
Mirarce was found to be a member of Avisauridae, close to Avisaurus itself.

== Paleoecology ==
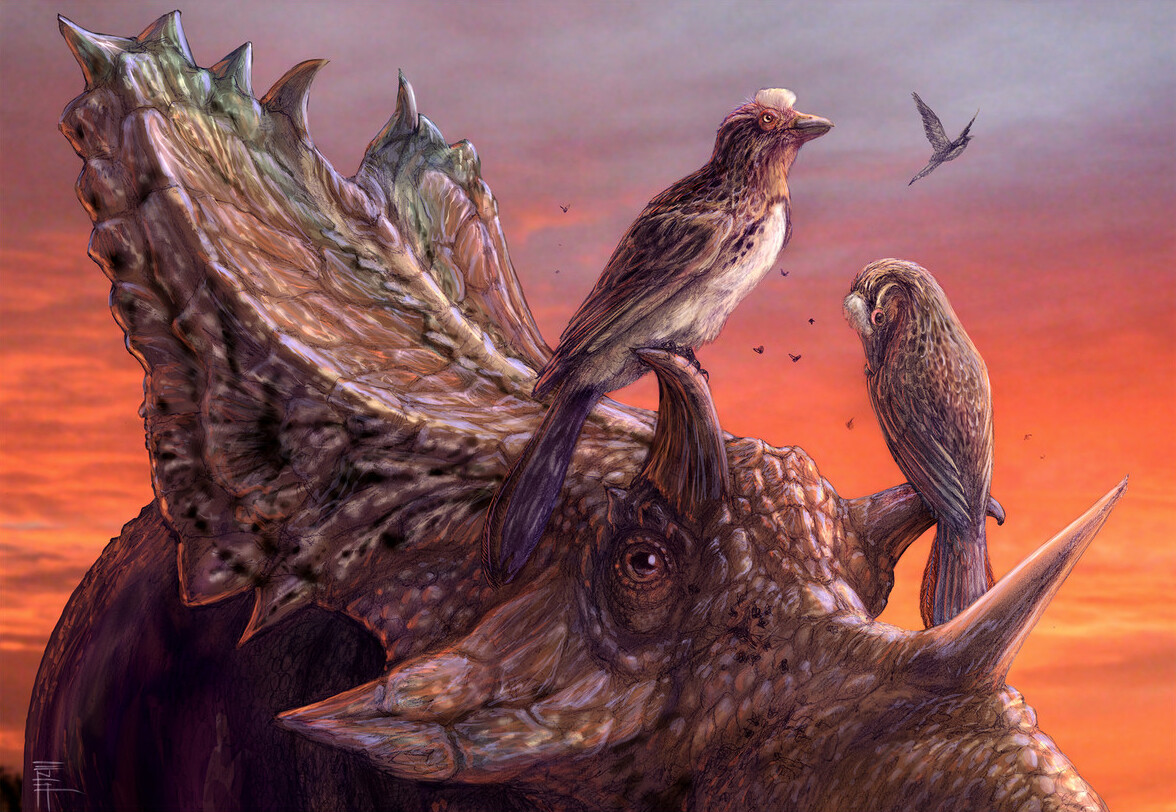
A reconstruction of Mirarce (here seen as a pair perched on the horns of a Utahceratops), illustrating the large body size of this taxon

Mirarce fossils have been found in the Kaiparowits Formation of western North America, which dates to the late Campanian age of the Cretaceous. At its large size, powerful talons and leg tendons, it would have been a raptorial predator akin to modern birds of prey.
