= Halimornis =

Halimornis Temporal range: Late Cretaceous, 80 Ma

Scientific classification
- Kingdom: Animalia
- Phylum: Chordata
- Class: Reptilia
- Clade: Dinosauria
- Clade: Saurischia
- Clade: Theropoda
- Clade: Avialae
- Clade: †Enantiornithes
- Family: †Avisauridae
- Genus: †Halimornis; Chiappe, Lamb & Ericson, 2002
- Species: †H. thompsoni

Binomial name
- †Halimornis thompsoni Chiappe, Lamb & Ericson, 2002

Extinct genus of birds

Halimornis was an enantiornithean bird. It lived during the Late Cretaceous about 80 mya and is known from fossils found in the Mooreville Chalk Formation in Greene County, Alabama. It is known from a single fossil individual, including preserved vertebrae, leg bones and part of the humerus (upper arm bone).

At the time, the area where the Mooreville Chalk was deposited was situated on the southern coast of the Western Interior Seaway, and may have been the site of a large delta where several major rivers flowed into the shallow sea. The fossil bird was found at a location that would have been about 50 km off shore, indicating that it was an ocean-going species. The name Halimornis means "bird of the sea". It would have lived alongside the more advanced seabird Ichthyornis dispar. It is one of the few known enantiornithine birds to have lived in a marine environment, along with the Australian Nanantius eos, the slightly younger Martinavis and "Ichthyornis" minusculus, which was originally misidentified as Ichthyornis based on its presence in marine deposits.
