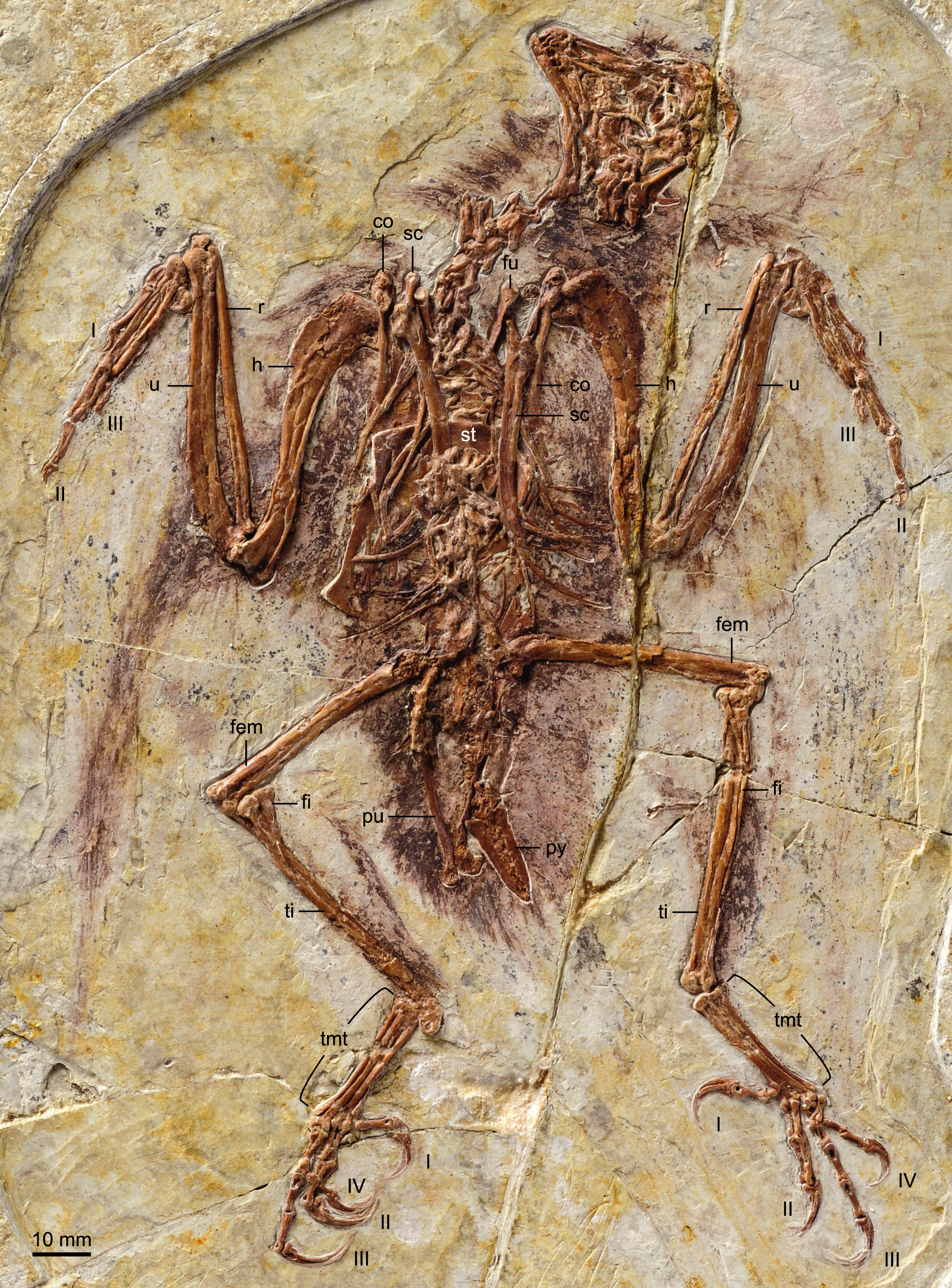
- Fossil specimen of a bohaiornithid (Zhouornis hani)

Scientific classification
- Kingdom: Animalia
- Phylum: Chordata
- Class: Reptilia
- Clade: Dinosauria
- Clade: Saurischia
- Clade: Theropoda
- Clade: Avialae
- Clade: Ornithothoraces
- Clade: †Enantiornithes; Walker, 1981

Subgroups
- †Avisauridae; †Bohaiornithidae; †Gobipterygidae; †Longipterygidae; †Pengornithidae; †Enantiornithidae; and see text

= Enantiornithes =

Enantiornithes Temporal range: Early Cretaceous–Late Cretaceous, 136–66 Ma

Extinct clade of avialan dinosaurs

The Enantiornithes (literally, "opposite birds", by which name they are popularly known), also known as enantiornithines or enantiornitheans in literature, are a group of extinct avialans ("birds" in the broad sense). They were the most abundant and diverse avialan group known from the Mesozoic era and the first to spread across the globe. Almost all retained teeth and clawed fingers on each wing, but otherwise looked much like modern birds externally. Internally, they notably differed in the arrangement of shoulder bones, with a reversed or "opposite" ball-and-socket joint. In Enantiornithes, the scapula functions as a socket and the coracoid as a ball, whereas in modern birds, these bones function respectively as a ball and a socket.

They were mostly small, about the size of sparrows. Their fossils are found only in the Cretaceous, and they diverged from the ancestors of modern birds early in that period, more than 130 million years ago. Over seventy species of Enantiornithes have been named, but some names represent only single bones, so it is likely that not all are valid. The Enantiornithes became extinct at the Cretaceous–Paleogene boundary, along with Hesperornithes and all other non-avian dinosaurs.

== Discovery and naming ==
The first Enantiornithes to be discovered were incorrectly referred to modern bird groups. For example, the first known species of Enantiornithes, Gobipteryx minuta, was originally considered a paleognath related to ostriches and tinamou. The Enantiornithes were first recognized as a distinct lineage, or "subclass" of birds, by Cyril A. Walker in 1981. Walker made this discovery based on some partial postcranial remains from the Maastrichtian (late Cretaceous period) Lecho Formation of El Brete, southern Salta Province, Argentina, which he assigned to a new genus, Enantiornis, giving the entire group its name. Since the 1990s, many more complete specimens of Enantiornithes have been discovered, and it was determined that a few previously described "birds" (e.g. Iberomesornis, Cathayornis, and Sinornis) were instead Enantiornithes.

The name "Enantiornithes" means "opposite birds", from Ancient Greek enantios (ἐνάντιος) "opposite" + ornithes (ὄρνιθες) "birds" . The name was coined by Cyril Alexander Walker in his landmark paper which established the group. In his paper, Walker explained what he meant by "opposite":

Perhaps the most fundamental and characteristic difference between the Enantiornithes and all other birds is in the nature of the articulation between the scapula [...] and the coracoid, where the 'normal' condition is completely reversed.

This refers to an anatomical feature – the articulation of the shoulder bones – which has a concave-convex ball-and-socket joint between the scapula (shoulder blade) and coracoid (the primary bone of the shoulder girdle in vertebrates other than mammals) that is the reverse of that of modern birds. Specifically, in the Enantiornithes, the scapula is concave and dish-shaped at this joint — functioning as a socket — and the coracoid is convex, functioning as a ball. In modern birds, the coracoid is concave and the scapula convex.

Walker was not clear on his reasons for giving this name in the etymology section of his paper, and this ambiguity led to some confusion among later researchers. For example, Alan Feduccia stated in 1996:

The birds are so named because, among many distinctive features, there is a unique formation of the triosseal canal and the metatarsals are fused proximally to distally, the opposite of that in modern birds

Feduccia's point about the tarsometatarsus (the combined upper foot and ankle bone) is correct, but Walker did not use this reasoning in his original paper. Walker never described the fusion of the tarsometatarsus as opposite, but rather as "Only partial". Also, it is not certain that Enantiornithes had triosseal canals, since no fossil preserves this feature.

As a group, the Enantiornithes are often referred to as "enantiornithines" in literature. However, several scientists have noted that this is incorrect, because following the standard rules for forming the names of animal groups, it implies reference only to the subfamily Enantiornithinae. Following the naming conventions used for modern birds as well as extinct groups, it has been pointed out that the correct term is "enantiornithean".

== Origin and range ==
Praeornis, from the Oxfordian-Kimmeridgian of Kazakhstan, may have been the earliest known member of Enantiornithes according to Agnolin et al. (2017).

Birds with confidently identified characteristics of Enantiornithes have been found in Albian of Australia, Maastrichtian of South America, Campanian of Mexico (Alexornis), Mongolia, and the western edge of prehistoric Asia, suggesting a worldwide distribution of this group or in the relatively warm regions, at least. Enantiornithes have been found on every continent except Antarctica. Fossils attributable to this group are exclusively Cretaceous in age, and it is believed that the Enantiornithes became extinct at the same time as their non-avialan dinosaur relatives. The earliest known Enantiornithes are from the Early Cretaceous of Spain (e.g. Noguerornis) and China (e.g. Protopteryx) and the latest from the Late Cretaceous of North and South America (e.g. Avisaurus and Enantiornis). The widespread occurrence of this group suggests that at least some Enantiornithes were able to cross oceans under their own power; they are the first known avialan lineage with a global distribution.

== Description ==
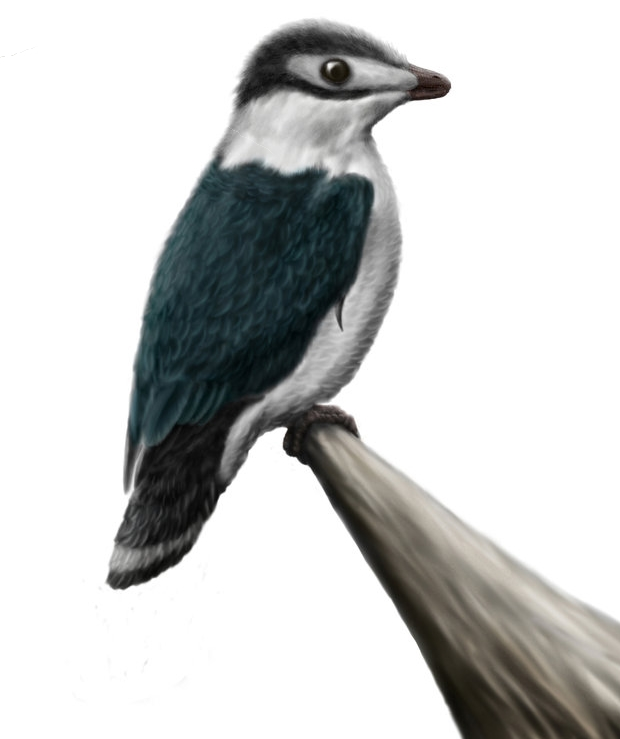
A life restoration of Iberomesornis, a species of early Enantiornithes

Many fossils of Enantiornithes are very fragmentary, and some species are only known from a piece of a single bone. Almost all specimens that are complete, in full articulation, and with soft tissue preservation are known from Las Hoyas in Cuenca, Spain and the Jehol group in Liaoning (China). Extraordinary remains of Enantiornithes have also been preserved in Burmese amber deposits dated to 99 million years ago and include hatchlings described in 2017 and 2018, as well as isolated body parts such as wings and feet. These amber remains are among the most well-preserved of any mesozoic dinosaur. Fossils of this clade have been found in both inland and marine sediments, suggesting that they were an ecologically diverse group.

Enantiornithes appear to have included waders, swimmers, granivores, insectivores, fishers, and raptors. The vast majority of Enantiornithes were small, between the size of a sparrow and a starling, however display considerable variation in size with some species. The largest species in this clade include Pengornis houi, Xiangornis shenmi, Zhouornis hani, and Mirarce eatoni, (with the latter species being described as similar in size to modern turkeys,) although at least a few larger species may have also existed, including a potentially crane-sized species known only from footprints in the Eumeralla Formation (and possibly also represented in the Wonthaggi Formation by a single furcula). Among the smallest described specimens are unnamed hatchlings, although the holotype specimens of Parvavis chuxiongensis and Cratoavis cearensis are comparable in size to small tits or hummingbirds.

=== Skull ===
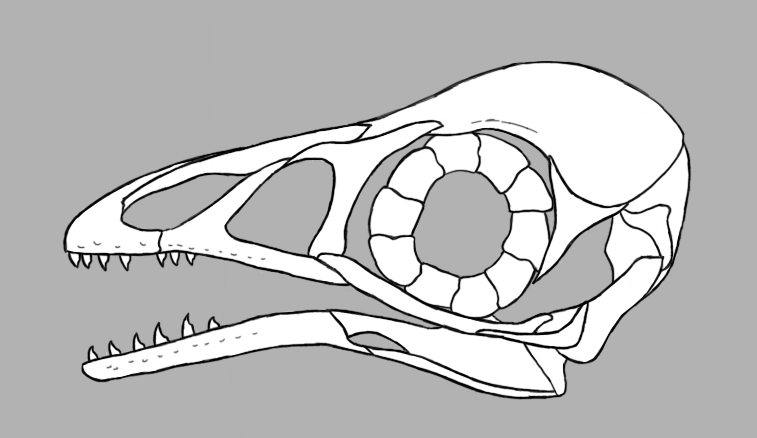
A reconstruction of the skull of Bohaiornis, a bohaiornithid.

Given their wide range of habitats and diets, the cranial morphology of Enantiornithes varied considerably between species. Skulls of Enantiornithes combined a unique suite of primitive and advanced features. As in more primitive avialans like Archaeopteryx, they retained several separate cranial bones, small premaxillae (bones of the snout tip) and most species had toothy jaws rather than toothless beaks. Only a few species, such as Gobipteryx minuta, were fully toothless and had beaks. They also had simple quadrate bones, a complete bar separating each orbit (eye hole) from each antorbital fenestra, and dentaries (the main toothed bones of the lower jaw) without forked rear tips. A squamosal bone is preserved in an indeterminate juvenile specimen, while a postorbital is preserved in Shenqiornis and Pengornis. In modern birds these bones are assimilated into the cranium. Some Enantiornithes may have had their temporal fenestrae (holes in the side of the head) merged into the orbits as in modern birds due to the postorbitals either not being present or not being long enough to divide the openings. A quadratojugal bone, which in modern birds is fused to the jugal, is preserved in Pterygornis. The presence of these primitive features of the skull would have rendered the Enantiornithes capable of only limited cranial kinesis (the ability to move the jaw independent of the cranium).

=== Wing ===
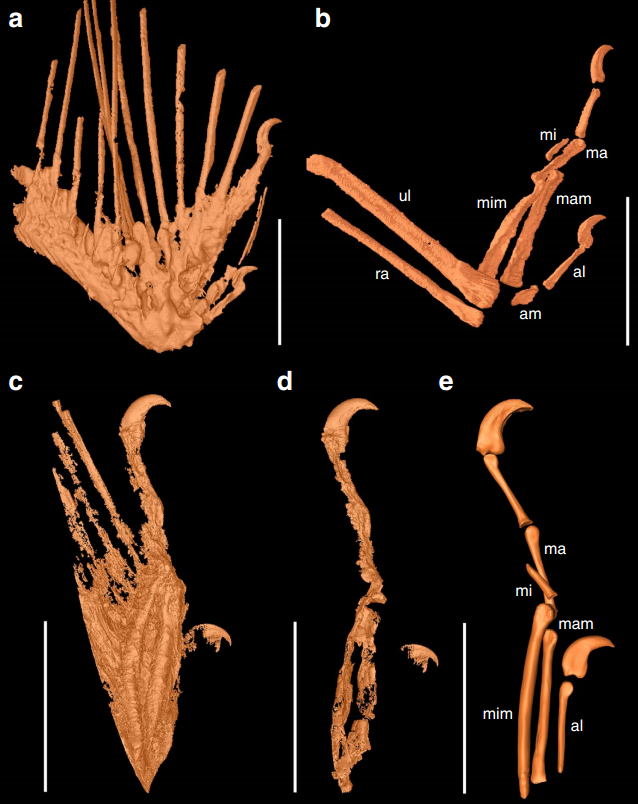
A micro-CT scan of an amber-encased wing attributable to Enantiornithes showing rachises, skin, muscle and claws.

As a very large group of birds, the Enantiornithes displayed a high diversity of different body plans based on differences in ecology and feeding, reflected in an equal diversity of wing forms, many paralleling adaptations to different lifestyles seen in modern birds. In general, the wings of Enantiornithes were advanced compared to more primitive avialans like Archaeopteryx, and displayed some features related to flight similar to those found in the lineage leading to modern birds, the Ornithuromorpha. While most Enantiornithes had claws on at least some of their fingers, many species had shortened hands, a highly mobile shoulder joint, and proportional changes in the wing bones similar to modern birds. Like modern birds, Enantiornithes had alulas, or "bastard wings", small forward-pointing arrangements of feathers on the first digit that granted higher maneuverability in the air and aided in precise landings.

Several wings with preserved feathers have been found in Burmese amber. These are the first complete Mesozoic dinosaur remains preserved this way (a few isolated feathers are otherwise known, unassigned to any species), and one of the most exquisitely preserved dinosaurian fossils known. The preserved wings show variations in feather pigment and prove that Enantiornithes had fully modern feathers, including barbs, barbules, and hooklets, and a modern arrangement of wing feather including long flight feathers, short coverts, a large alula and an undercoat of down.

One fossil of Enantiornithes shows wing-like feather tufts on its legs, similar to Archaeopteryx. The leg feathers are also reminiscent of the four-winged dinosaur Microraptor, however differ by the feathers being shorter, more disorganized (they do not clearly form a wing) and only extend down to the ankle rather than along the foot.

=== Tail ===
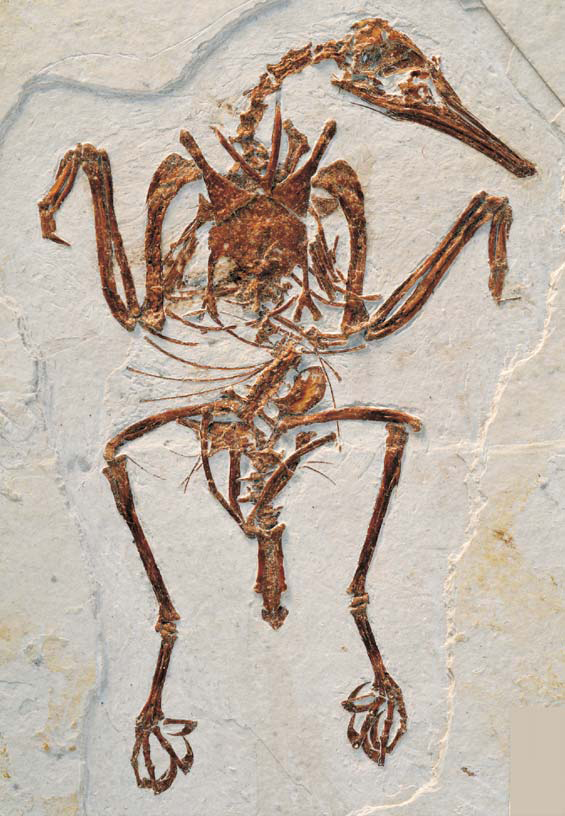
Fossil skeleton of Rapaxavis pani (a longipterygid) with a preserved pygostyle

Clarke et al. (2006) surveyed all fossils of Enantiornithes then known and concluded that none had preserved tail feathers that formed a lift-generating fan, as in modern birds. They found that all avialans outside of Euornithes (the clade they referred to as Ornithurae) with preserved tail feathers had only short coverts or elongated paired tail plumes. They suggested that the development of the pygostyle in Enantiornithes must have been a function of tail shortening, not the development of a modern tail feather anatomy. These scientists suggested that a fan of tail feathers and the associated musculature needed to control them, known as the rectrical bulb, evolved alongside a short, triangular pygostyle, like the ones in modern birds, rather than the long, rod- or dagger-shaped pygostyles in more primitive avialans like the Enantiornithes. Instead of a feather fan, most Enantiornithes had a pair of long specialized pinfeathers similar to those of the extinct Confuciusornis and certain extant birds-of-paradise.

However, further discoveries showed that at least among basal Enantiornithes, tail anatomy was more complex than previously thought. One genus, Shanweiniao, was initially interpreted as having at least four long tail feathers that overlapped each other and might have formed a lift-generating surface similar to the tail fans of Euornithes, though a later study indicates that Shanweiniao was more likely to have rachis-dominated tail feathers similar to feathers present in Paraprotopteryx. Chiappeavis, a primitive pengornithid, had a fan of tail feathers similar to that of more primitive avialans like Sapeornis, suggesting that this might have been the ancestral condition, with pinfeathers being a feature evolved several times in early avialans for display purposes. Another species of Enantiornithes, Feitianius, also had an elaborate fan of tail feathers. More importantly, soft tissue preserved around the tail was interpreted as the remains of a rectrical bulb, suggesting that this feature was not in fact restricted to species with modern-looking pygostyles, but might have evolved much earlier than previously thought and been present in many Enantiornithes. At least one genus of Enantiornithes, Cruralispennia, had a modern-looking pygostyle but lacked a tail fan.

== Biology ==
=== Diet ===
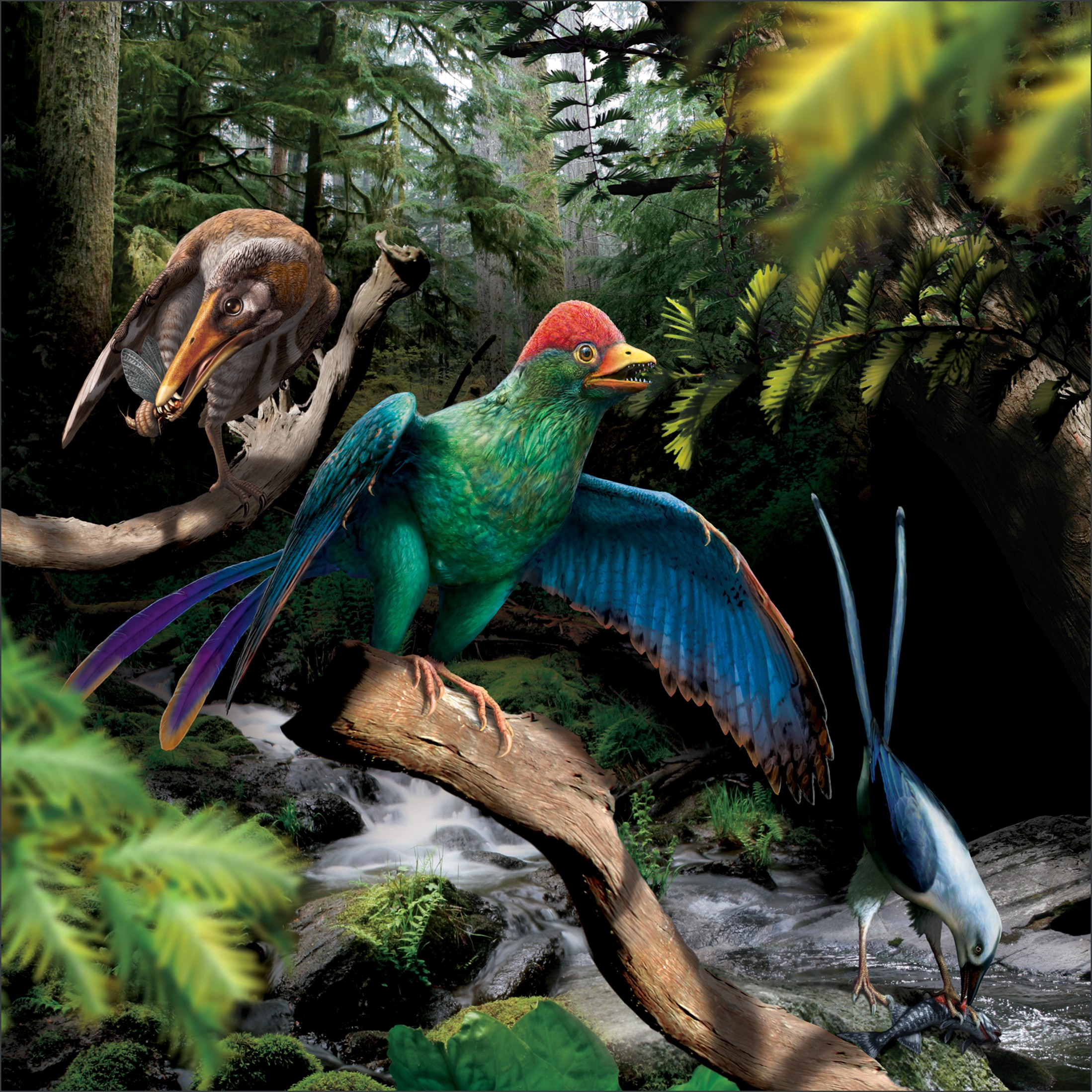
Life reconstruction of enantiornithine birds feeding (left Longipteryx, centre Bohaiornis and right Pengornis)

Given the wide diversity of skull shape among Enantiornithes, many different dietary specializations must have been present among the group. Some, like Shenqiornis, had large, robust jaws suitable for eating hard-shelled invertebrates. The short, blunt teeth of Pengornis were likely used to feed on soft-bodied arthropods. The strongly hooked talons of Bohaiornithidae suggest that they were predators of small to medium-sized vertebrates, but their robust teeth instead suggest a diet of hard-shelled animals.

A few specimens preserve actual stomach contents. None of these preserve the skull, so direct correlation between their known diet and snout/tooth shape cannot be made. Eoalulavis was found to have the remains of exoskeletons from aquatic crustaceans preserved in its digestive tract, and Enantiophoenix preserved corpuscles of amber among the fossilized bones, suggesting that this animal fed on tree sap, much like modern sapsuckers and other birds. The sap would have fossilized and become amber. However, more recently it has been suggested that the sap moved post-mortem, hence not representing true stomachal contents. Combined with the putative fish pellets of Piscivorenantiornis turning out to be fish excrement, the strange stomachal contents of some species turning out to be ovaries and the supposed gastroliths of Bohaiornis being random mineral precipitates, only the Eoalulavis displays actual stomach contents.

A study on paravian digestive systems indicates that known Enantiornithes lacked a crop and a gizzard, didn't use gastroliths and didn't eject pellets. This is considered at odds with the high diversity of diets that their different teeth and skull shapes imply, though some modern birds have lost the gizzard and rely solely on strong stomachal acids. An example was discovered with what was suspected to be gastroliths in the what would have been the fossil's stomach, re-opening the discussion of the use of gastroliths by Enantiornithes. X-ray and scanning microscope inspection of the rocks determined that they were actually chalcedony crystals, and not gastroliths.

Longipterygidae is the most extensively studied family in terms of diet due to their rather unusual rostral anatomy, with long jaws and few teeth arranged at the jaw ends. They have variously been interpreted as piscivores, probers akin to shorebirds and as arboreal bark-probers. A 2022 study however does find them most likely to be generalistic insectivores (sans possibly Shengjingornis due to its larger size, poorly preserved skull and unusual pedal anatomy), being too small for specialised carnivory and herbivory; the atypical rostrum is tentatively speculated to be unrelated to feeding ecology. However a posterior study has found them to be herbivorous, including the presence of gymnosperm seeds in their digestive system.

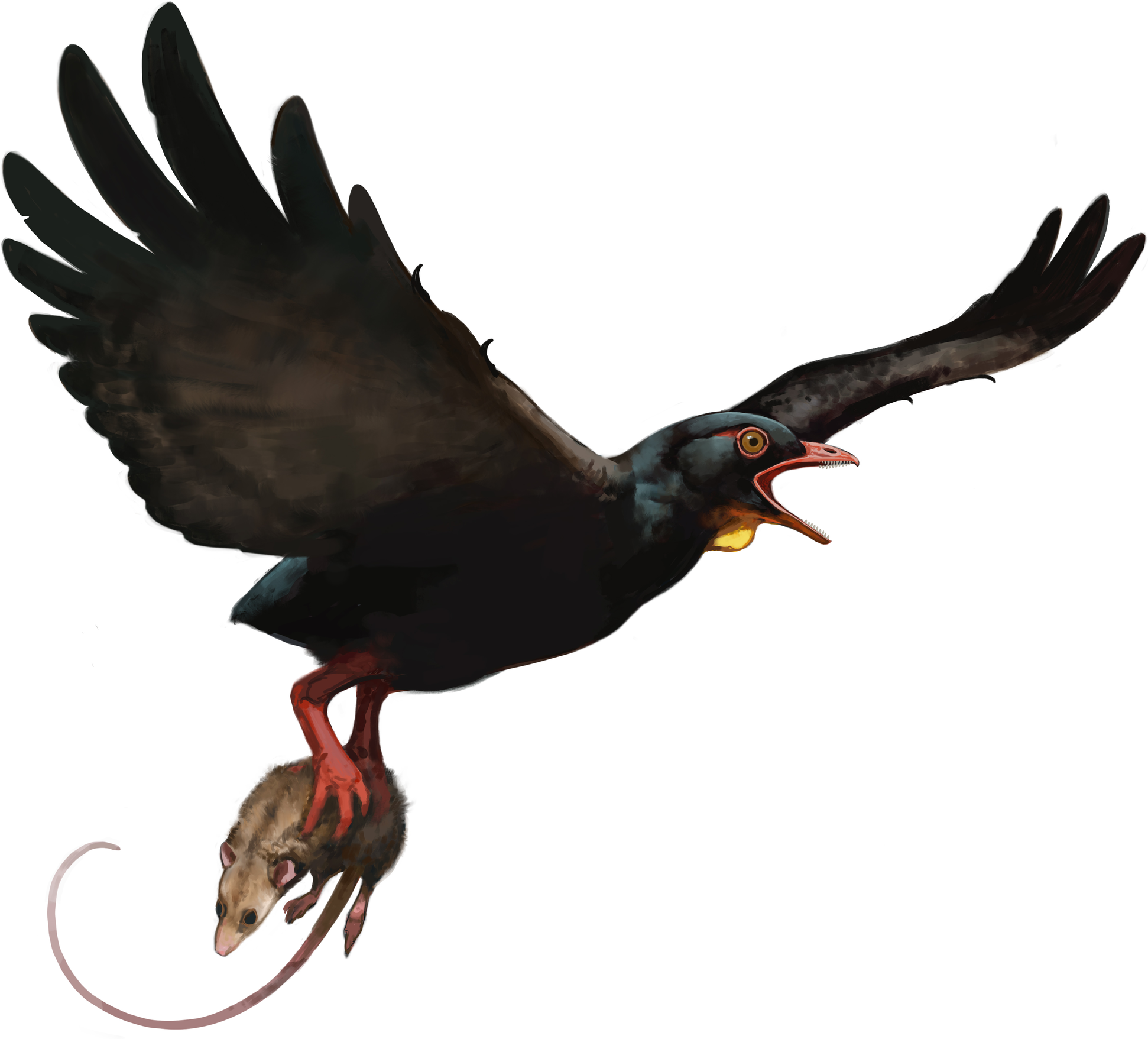
Depiction of Avisaurus preying on a prehistoric mammal

Avisaurids occupied a niche analogous to modern birds of prey, having the ability to lift small prey with their feet in a manner similar to hawks or owls.

=== Predation ===
A fossil from Spain reported by Sanz et al. in 2001 included the remains of four hatchling skeletons of three different species of Enantiornithes. They are substantially complete, very tightly associated, and show surface pitting of the bones that indicates partial digestion. The authors concluded that this association was a regurgitated pellet and, from the details of the digestion and the size, that the hatchlings were swallowed whole by a pterosaur or small theropod dinosaur. This was the first evidence that Mesozoic avialans were prey animals, and that some Mesozoic pan-avians regurgitated pellets like owls do today.

=== Life history ===
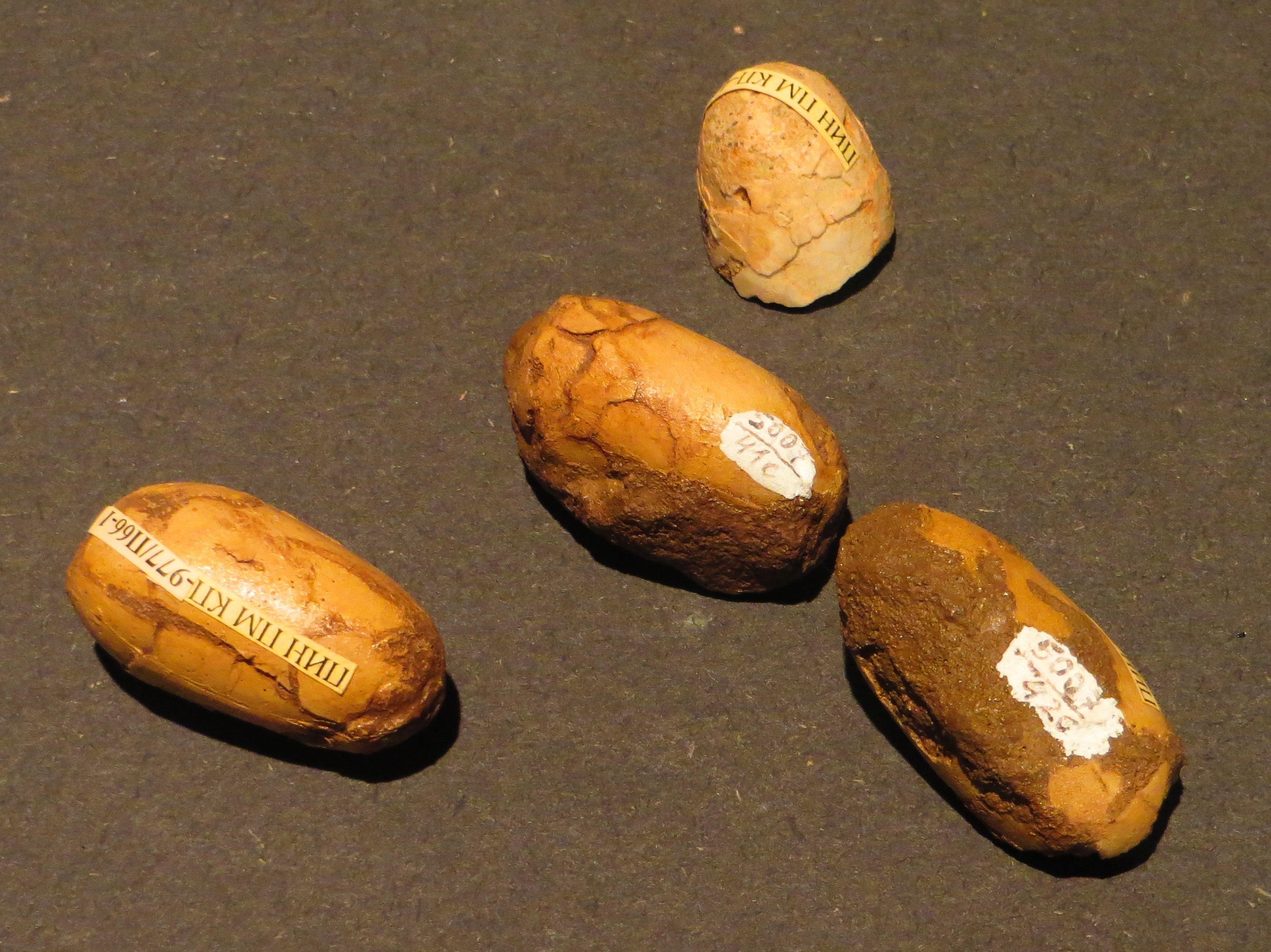
Fossilized eggs of Gobipteryx minuta, Dinosaurium (Prague)

Known fossils of Enantiornithes include eggs, embryos, and hatchlings. An embryo, still curled in its egg, has been reported from the Yixian Formation. Juvenile specimens can be identified by a combination of factors: rough texture of their bone tips indicating portions which were still made of cartilage at the time of death, relatively small breastbones, large skulls and eyes, and bones which had not yet fused to one another. Some hatchling specimens have been given formal names, including "Liaoxiornis delicatus"; however, Luis Chiappe and colleagues considered the practice of naming new species based on juveniles detrimental to the study of Enantiornithes, because it is nearly impossible to determine which adult species a given juvenile specimen belongs to, making any species with a hatchling holotype a nomen dubium.

Together with hatchling specimens of the Mongolian Gobipteryx and Gobipipus, these finds demonstrate that hatchling Enantiornithes had the skeletal ossification, well-developed wing feathers, and large brain which correlate with precocial or superprecocial patterns of development in birds of today. In other words, Enantiornithes probably hatched from the egg already well developed and ready to run, forage, and possibly even fly at just a few days old.

Findings suggests Enantiornithes, especially the toothed species, had a longer incubation time than modern birds.

Analyses of Enantiornithes bone histology have been conducted to determine the growth rates of these animals. A 2006 study of Concornis bones showed a growth pattern different from modern birds; although growth was rapid for a few weeks after hatching, probably until fledging, this small species did not reach adult size for a long time, probably several years. Other studies have all supported the view that growth to adult size was slow, as it is in living precocial birds (as opposed to altricial birds, which are known to reach adult size quickly). Studies of the rate of bone growth in a variety of Enantiornithes has shown that smaller species tended to grow faster than larger ones, the opposite of the pattern seen in more primitive species like Jeholornis and in non-avialan dinosaurs. Some analyses have interpreted the bone histology to indicate that Enantiornithes may not have had fully avian endothermy, instead having an intermediate metabolic rate. However a 2021 study rejects the idea that they had less endothermic metabolisms than modern birds.

Evidence of colonial nesting has been found in Enantiornithes, in sediments from the Late Cretaceous (Maastrichtian) of Romania. Evidence from nesting sites shows that Enantiornithes buried their eggs like modern megapodes, which is consistent with their inferred superprecocial adaptations.

A 2020 study on a juvenile's feathers further stresses the ontological similarities to modern megapodes, but cautions several differences such as the arboreal nature of most Enantiornithes as opposed to the terrestrial lifestyle of megapodes.

It has been speculated that superprecociality in Enantiornithes might have prevented them from developing specialised toe arrangements seen in modern birds like zygodactyly.

Although the vast majority of histology studies and known remains of Enantiornithes point to superprecociality being the norm, one specimen, MPCM-LH-26189, seems to represent an altricial juvenile, implying that like modern birds Enantiornithes explored multiple reproductive strategies.

=== Flight ===
Because many Enantiornithes lacked complex tails and possessed radically different wing anatomy compared to modern birds, they have been the subject of several studies testing their flight capabilities.

Traditionally, they have been considered inferior flyers, due to the shoulder girdle anatomy being assumed to be more primitive and unable to support a ground-based launching mechanism, as well as due to the absence of rectrices in many species.

However, several studies have shown that they were efficient flyers, like modern birds, possessing a similarly complex nervous system and wing feather ligaments. Additionally, the lack of a complex tail appears to not have been very relevant for avian flight as a whole - some extinct birds like lithornids also lacked complex tail feathers but were good flyers, and they appear to have been capable of a ground based launching.

Enantiornithes resemble Ornithuromorphs in many anatomical features of the flight apparatus, but a sternal keel is absent in the basal-most members, only a single basal taxon appears to have had a triosseal canal, and their robust pygostyle seems unable to support the muscles that control the modern tail feathers involved in flight. Though some basal Enantiornithes exhibit ancestral flight apparatuses, by the end of the Mesozoic many Enantiornithes had several features convergent with the Neornithes including a deeply keeled sternum, a narrow furcula with a short hypocleidium, and ulnar quill knobs that indicate increased aerial abilities.

At least Elsornis appears to have become secondarily flightless.

== Classification ==
Some researchers classify Enantiornithes, along with the true birds, in the class Aves. Others use the more restrictive crown group definition of Aves (which only includes neornithes, anatomically modern birds), and place Enantiornithes in the more inclusive group Avialae. Enantiornithes were more advanced than Archaeopteryx, Confuciusornis, and Sapeornis, but in several respects they were more primitive than modern birds, perhaps following an intermediate evolutionary path.

A consensus of scientific analyses indicates that Enantiornithes is one of two major groups within the larger group Ornithothoraces. The other ornithothoracine group is Euornithes or Ornithuromorpha, which includes all living birds as a subset. This means that Enantiornithes were a successful branch of avialan evolution, but one that diversified entirely separately from the lineage leading to modern birds. One study has however found that the shared sternal anatomy was acquired independently and such a relationship needs to be reexamined.

Enantiornithes classification and taxonomy has historically been complicated by a number of factors. In 2010, paleontologists Jingmai O'Connor and Gareth Dyke outlined a number of criticisms against the prevailing practices of scientists failing to describe many specimens in enough detail for others to evaluate thoroughly. Some species have been described based on specimens which are held in private collections, making further study or review of previous findings impossible. Because it is often unfeasible for other scientists to study each specimen in person given the worldwide distribution of the Enantiornithes, and due to the many uninformative descriptions which have been published on possibly important specimens, many of these specimens become "functional nomina dubia". Furthermore, many species have been named based on extremely fragmentary specimens, which would not be very informative scientifically even if they were described sufficiently. Over one-third of all named species are based on only a fragment of a single bone. O'Connor and Dyke argued that while these specimens can help expand knowledge of the time span or geographic range of the Enantiornithes and it is important to describe them, naming such specimens is "unjustifiable".

=== Relationships ===
Enantiornithes is the sister group to Euornithes, and together they form a clade called Ornithothoraces (though see above). Most phylogenetic studies have recovered Enantiornithes as a monophyletic group distinct from the modern birds and their closest relatives. The 2002 phylogenetic analysis by Clarke and Norell, though, reduced the number of Enantiornithes autapomorphies to just four.

Enantiornithes systematics are highly provisional and notoriously difficult to study, due to their small size and the fact that Enantiornithes tend to be extremely homoplastic, or very similar to each other in most of their skeletal features due to convergent evolution rather than common ancestry. What appears fairly certain by now is that there were subdivisions within Enantiornithes possibly including some minor basal lineages in addition to the more advanced Euenantiornithes. The details of the interrelationship of all these lineages, indeed the validity of most, is disputed, although the Avisauridae, for one example, seem likely to constitute a valid group. Phylogenetic taxonomists have hitherto been very reluctant to suggest delimitations of clades of Enantiornithes.

One such delineation named the Euenantiornithes, was defined by Chiappe (2002) as comprising all species closer to Sinornis than to Iberomesornis. Because Iberomesornis is often found to be the most primitive or basal member of the Enantiornithes, Euenantiornithes may be an extremely inclusive group, made up of all Enantiornithes except for Iberomesornis itself. Despite being in accordance with phylogenetic nomenclature, this definition of Euenantiornithes was severely criticized by some researchers, such as Paul Sereno, who called it "a ill-defined clade [...] a good example of a poor choice in a phylogenetic definition".

The cladogram below was found by an analysis by Wang et al. in 2015, updated from a previous data set created by Jingmai O'Connor.

- Ornithothoraces
  - Euornithes
  - †Enantiornithes
    - †Protopteryx
    - †Pengornithidae
    - †Longipterygidae
    - †Euenantiornithes
      - †Eocathayornis
      - - †Elsornis
        - - †Dunhuangia
          - †Fortunguavis
          - - †Bohaiornithidae
            - - †Pterygornis
              - - †Eoenantiornis
                - - †Cathayornis
                  - - †Vescornis
                    - †Neuquenornis
                    - †Gobipteryx
                    - †Eoalulavis
                    - - †Qiliania
                      - †Concornis

The cladogram below is from Wang et al., 2022, and includes most named taxa and recovers several previously named clades. Letters on branches indicate the positions of "wildcard" taxa, those which have been recovered in multiple disparate positions.

- Enantiornithes l
  - Cruralispennia
  - - Protopteryx
    - - - Elsornis
        - Flexomornis
      - - Longipterygidae
          - Iberomesornis
          - bh
            - bh
              Longirostravis
            - Rapaxavis
        - Euenantiornithes
          - c
            - e
              Sinornis
            - e
              - Enantiornis
              - - Halimornis
                - - Concornis
                  - Neuquenornis
            - c
              - b
                - Eoalulavis
                - Liaoningornis
              - - Gobipteryx
                - Hebeiornis
          - - Eocathayornis
            - - - Qiliania
                - Avisauridae e
                  - - Intiornis
                    - Soroavisaurus
                  - - Avisaurus
                    - - Gettyia
                      - n
                        Mirarce
              - - Feitianius
                - - - fn
                      Longusunguis
                    - fn
                      - n
                        Dunhuangia
                      - fn
                        Musivavis
                  - - Pengornithidae m
                      - Pengornis
                      - m
                        - Yuanchuavis
                        - - Eopengornis
                          - Parapengornis
                    - - - Grabauornis
                        - - Parvavis
                          - - Cratoavis
                            - Gretcheniao
                      - - - Huoshanornis
                          - Shengjingornis
                        - - Zhouornis
                          - Bohaiornithidae
                            - Bohaiornis
                            - ij
                              - Eoenantiornis
                              - - Fortunguavis
                                - - Mystiornis
                                  - - Shenqiornis
                                    - Sulcavis

Key to letters:

b = Boluochia
c = Cathayornis
e = Enantiophoenix
f = Houornis
h = Longipteryx
i = Parabohaiornis
j = Pterygornis
l = Vorona
m = Yuanjiawaornis
n = Yungavolucris

== List of genera ==
=== Incertae sedis ===
Enantiornithes taxonomy is difficult to evaluate, and as a result few clades within the group are consistently found by phylogenetic analyses. Most Enantiornithes are not included in any specific family, and as such are listed here. Many of these have been considered Euenantiornithes, although the controversy behind this name means that it is not used consistently in studies of Enantiornithes.

Name	Year	Formation	Location	Notes	Images
Abavornis	1998	Bissekty Formation (Late Cretaceous, Turonian to Coniacian)	Uzbekistan	One of many fragmentary Bissekty Enantiornithes, known only from coracoids	
Alethoalaornis	2007	Jiufotang Formation (Early Cretaceous, Aptian)	China	Poorly known	
Alexornis	1976	La Bocana Roja Formation (Late Cretaceous, Campanian)	Mexico	One of the first Enantiornithes known. Once thought to be an ancient relative of rollers and woodpeckers	
Avimaia	2019	Xiagou Formation (Early Cretaceous, Aptian)	China	One specimen from this genus died with an unlaid egg in its body	
Bauxitornis	2010	Csehbánya Formation (Late Cretaceous, Santonian)	Hungary	Fragmentary but unique in the structure of its tarsometatarsus	
Brevirostruavis	2021	Jiufotang Formation (Early Cretaceous, Aptian)	China	Possessed an enlarged hyoid that suggests a feeding specialization similar to hummingbirds, honeyeaters, and woodpeckers	
Castignovolucris	2023	Argiles et Grès à Reptiles Formation (Late Cretaceous, Campanian)	France	May have been the size of a Canada goose	
Catenoleimus	1998	Bissekty Formation (Late Cretaceous, Turonian to Coniacian)	Uzbekistan	One of many fragmentary Bissekty Enantiornithes, known only from a coracoid	
Cathayornis	1992	Jiufotang Formation (Early Cretaceous, Aptian)	China	One of the first Jehol biota Enantiornithes described. Known from many species, although some are now placed into their own genera. May have had a similar appearance and lifestyle to a pitta	
Concornis	1992	Las Hoyas (Early Cretaceous, Barremian)	Spain	One of the most complete Las Hoyas Enantiornithes	
Cratoavis	2015	Santana Formation (Early Cretaceous, Aptian)	Brazil	A very well-preserved South American member of the group, complete with ribbon-like tail feathers	
Cruralispennia	2017	Huajiying Formation (Early Cretaceous, Hauterivian)	China	Had an unusual ornithuromorph-like pygostyle and brush-like thigh feathers. One of the oldest Enantiornithes	
Cuspirostrisornis	1997	Jiufotang Formation (Early Cretaceous, Aptian)	China	Originally mistakenly believed to have possessed a pointed beak	
Dalingheornis	2006	Yixian Formation (Early Cretaceous, Aptian)	China	Was well-adapted for climbing due to its heterodactyl feet, like those of a trogon	
Dunhuangia	2015	Xiagou Formation (Early Cretaceous, Aptian)	China	A genus of Enantiornithes from the Changma basin, an area which is unusually dominated by ornithuromorphs	
Elbretornis	2009	Lecho Formation (Late Cretaceous, Maastrichtian)	Argentina	Only known from wing bones. May be synonymous with other Lecho formation Enantiornithes	
Elektorornis	2019	Burmese Amber (Late Cretaceous, Cenomanian)	Myanmar	Known from a foot preserved in amber with an elongated middle toe	
Enantiornis	1981	Lecho Formation (Late Cretaceous, Maastrichtian)	Argentina	Although only known from a few bones, this genus is the namesake of Enantiornithes. It was also one of the largest and last representative of the group prior to their extinction	
Eoalulavis	1996	Las Hoyas (Early Cretaceous, Barremian)	Spain	Preserves feathers including an alula, a specialized type of feather which controls air flow over the wing	
Eocathayornis	2002	Jiufotang Formation (Early Cretaceous, Aptian)	China	Once considered to be a basal close relative of Cathayornis, although now considered to be more distantly related	
Eoenantiornis	1999	Yixian Formation (Early Cretaceous, Aptian)	China	Well-preserved but inconsistent in phylogenetic placement	
Evgenavis	2014	Ilek Formation (Early Cretaceous, Barremian)	Russia	Known only from a tarsometatarsus which shares some features with those of Enantiornithes	
Explorornis	1998	Bissekty Formation (Late Cretaceous, Turonian to Coniacian)	Uzbekistan	One of many fragmentary Bissekty Enantiornithes, known only from coracoids	
Falcatakely	2020	Maevarano Formation (Late Cretaceous, Maastrichtian)	Madagascar	Developed a massive snout with only a single tooth, despite retaining a "primitive" skull arrangement in contrast to modern birds	
Feitianius	2015	Xiagou Formation (Early Cretaceous, Aptian)	China	Possessed an elaborate set of tail feathers, unlike the paired ribbon-like feathers of most Enantiornithes	
Flexomornis	2010	Woodbine Formation (Late Cretaceous, Cenomanian)	United States (Texas)	One of the oldest North American avialans found, albeit known only from fragmentary remains	
Fortipesavis	2021	Burmese amber (Late Cretaceous, Cenomanian)	Myanmar	Had an enlarged outer toe that may have been an adaptation for perching	
Fortunguavis	2014	Jiufotang Formation (Early Cretaceous, Aptian)	China	Had robust bones, including feet and claws which may have been adapted for climbing trees	
Grabauornis	2015	Yixian Formation (Early Cretaceous, Barremian)	China	The proportions of the wings of this genus of Enantiornithes as well as the presence of an alula suggest that it was a good flier	
Gracilornis	2011	Jiufotang Formation (Early Cretaceous, Aptian)	China	A possible relative of Cathayornis with characteristically slender bones	
Gurilynia	1999	Nemegt Formation (Late Cretaceous, Maastrichtian)	Mongolia	A poorly known genus of Enantiornithes, but evidently a large and late-surviving member of the group	
Hollanda	2010	Barun Goyot Formation (Late Cretaceous, Campanian)	Mongolia	Originally identified as an ornithuromorph but since reinterpreted as a genus of Enantiornithes closely related to Lectavis.	
Holbotia	2015	Andaikhudag Formation (Early Cretaceous, Aptian)	Mongolia	Considered a small pterosaur since its discovery in 1977 until it received a formal description in 2015. Possessed unique neck vertebrae and a primitive palate	
Houornis	1997	Jiufotang Formation (Early Cretaceous, Aptian)	China	Once considered to be dubious or a species of Cathayornis, although a 2015 study considered it to be a valid genus	
Huoshanornis	2010	Jiufotang Formation (Early Cretaceous, Aptian)	China	May have been a very maneuverable flier due to the structure of its hand and sternum	
Iberomesornis	1992	Las Hoyas (Early Cretaceous, Barremian)	Spain	One of the first genera of Enantiornithes known from decent remains. Also one of the oldest and most primitive members of the group	
Imparavis	2024	Jiufotang Formation (Early Cretaceous, Aptian)	China	The earliest known enantiornithine with a toothless beak	
Incolornis	1998	Bissekty Formation (Late Cretaceous, Turonian to Coniacian)	Uzbekistan	One of many fragmentary Bissekty Enantiornithes, known only from coracoids. One species was once considered to belong to Enantiornis	
Junornis	2017	Yixian Formation (Early Cretaceous, Aptian)	China	So well preserved that its flight pattern could be reconstructed using the proportions of its feathers and wings	
Kizylkumavis	1984	Bissekty Formation (Late Cretaceous, Turonian to Coniacian)	Uzbekistan	One of the many fragmentary Bissekty Enantiornithes, known only from a humerus fragment	
Largirostrornis	1997	Jiufotang Formation (Early Cretaceous, Aptian)	China	Possibly related to Cuspirostrisornis or a synonym of Cathayornis	
Lectavis	1993	Lecho Formation (Late Cretaceous, Maastrichtian)	Argentina	A large and long-legged member of the group, proportionally similar to modern shorebirds	
Lenesornis	1996	Bissekty Formation (Late Cretaceous, Turonian to Coniacian)	Uzbekistan	One of many fragmentary Bissekty Enantiornithes, known only from a synsacrum fragment. Originally considered to belong to Ichthyornis	
Liaoningornis	1996	Yixian Formation (Early Cretaceous, Aptian)	China	Originally believed to be an ornithuran, but now considered a relative of Eoalulavis	
Longchengornis	1997	Jiufotang Formation (Early Cretaceous, Aptian)	China	May have been a synonym of Cathayornis	
Magnusavis	2024	Hell Creek Formation (Late Cretaceous, Maastrichtian)	United States (Montana)	A large enantiornithine closely related to avisaurids	
Martinavis	2007	Grès à Reptiles Formation, Lecho Formation (Late Cretaceous, Maastrichtian)	France Argentina	Although known only from humeri, this genus was large and lived in a broad range	
Microenantiornis	2017	Jiufotang Formation (Early Cretaceous, Aptian)	China	A small member of the group which possessed several primitive and derived features compared to other Enantiornithes	
Mirusavis	2020	Yixian Formation (Early Cretaceous, Barremian to Aptian)	China	Holotype was a small osteologically immature female preserved with medullary bone tissue	
Monoenantiornis	2016	Yixian Formation (Early Cretaceous, Aptian)	China	Known from a juvenile specimen which depicts how various features developed in Enantiornithes as they age	
Musivavis	2022	Jiufotang Formation (Early Cretaceous, Aptian)	China	Most similar to bohaiornithids but also has features of other groups of Enantiornithes	
Nanantius	1986	Toolebuc Formation (Early Cretaceous, Albian)	Australia	Fragmentary, but may have been a seabird because remains from this genus have been found as ichthyosaur gut content	
Navaornis	2024	Adamantina Formation (Late Cretaceous, Santonian to Campanian)	Brazil	The first toothless enantiornithean from South America, known from a three-dimensionally preserved skull	
Noguerornis	1989	El Montsec (Early Cretaceous, Barremian)	Spain	Preserves impressions of a propatagium, a skin flap on the shoulder which forms part of a wing	
Novavis	2025	Xiagou Formation (Early Cretaceous, Aptian)	China	An Icterus-sized bird with an unusually small pubis bone	
Orienantius	2018	Huajiying Formation (Early Cretaceous, Hauterivian)	China	Many soft tissue details of specimens from this genus were revealed by UV light	
Otogornis	1993	Yijinholuo Formation (Early Cretaceous)	China	Poorly known	
Paraprotopteryx	2007	Qiaotou member of the Huajiying Formation (Early Cretaceous, Aptian?)	China	Seemingly had four ribbon-like tail feathers instead of only two as in most Enantiornithes	
Parvavis	2014	Jiangdihe Formation (Late Cretaceous, Turonian to Santonian)	China	Small but fully mature at the time of its death. One of only a few Chinese Enantiornithes dated to the Late Cretaceous	
Piscivorenantiornis	2017	Jiufotang Formation (Early Cretaceous, Aptian)	China	Known from a disarticulated skeleton preserved overlying a piece of stomach content composed of fish bones, which may have been its last meal	
Protopteryx	2000	Huajiying Formation (Early Cretaceous, Hauterivian)	China	One of the oldest and most primitive members of the group	
Pterygornis	2016	Jiufotang Formation (Early Cretaceous, Aptian)	China	One disarticulated skeleton from this genus possesses well-preserved bones of the skull, including a quadratojugal	
Qiliania	2011	Xiagou Formation (Early Cretaceous, Aptian)	China	Some of this genus's remains include well-preserved hindlimbs. the species names, Q. graffini, is named after Greg Graffin from the band Bad Religion	
Sazavis	1989	Bissekty Formation (Late Cretaceous, Turonian to Coniacian)	Uzbekistan	One of many fragmentary Bissekty Enantiornithes, known only from a tibiotarsus (shin bone)	
Shangyang	2019	Jiufotang Formation (Early Cretaceous, Aptian)	China	Unusually, the premaxillae of this genus were fused	
Sinornis	1992	Jiufotang Formation (Early Cretaceous, Aptian)	China	One of the first Jehol biota Enantiornithes described. Similar to Cathayornis but usually considered to be distinct	
Xiangornis	2012	Jiufotang Formation (Early Cretaceous, Aptian)	China	The hand of this genus was similar to that of ornithuromorphs, likely through convergent evolution. A large member of the group	
Yatenavis	2022	Chorrillo Formation (Late Cretaceous, Maastrichtian)	Argentina	The southernmost known member of Enantiornithes and one of the youngest members of the group	
Yuanjiawaornis	2015	Jiufotang Formation (Early Cretaceous, Aptian)	China	One of the largest Enantiornithes known from decent remains	
Yungavolucris	1993	Lecho Formation (Late Cretaceous, Maastrichtian)	Argentina	Had a large and unusually wide tarsometatarsal (ankle bone)	
Yuornis	2021	Qiupa Formation (Late Cretaceous, Maastrichtian)	China	A large, toothless genus of Enantiornithes, one of the most-well preserved members from the Late Cretaceous.	

=== Longipterygidae ===
The Longipterygidae was a family of long-snouted early Cretaceous Enantiornithes, with teeth only at the tips of the snout. They are generally considered to be fairly basal members of the group.

Name	Year	Formation	Location	Notes	Images
Boluochia	1995	Jiufotang Formation (Early Cretaceous, Aptian)	China	Originally mistakenly believed to have possessed a hooked beak	
Camptodontornis	2010	Jiufotang Formation (Early Cretaceous, Aptian)	China	Originally called Camptodontus, although that genus name is occupied by a beetle	
Chromeornis	2025	Jiufotang Formation (Early Cretaceous, Aptian)	China	Preserves unusual gastroliths and several traces of soft tissue	
Dapingfangornis	2006	Jiufotang Formation (Early Cretaceous, Aptian)	China	May have had a thornlike structure on its forehead	
Longipteryx	2001	Jiufotang Formation (Early Cretaceous, Aptian)	China	The most common and well-known member of the family	
Longirostravis	2004	Yixian Formation (Early Cretaceous, Aptian)	China	Like other longipterygids, it possessed a thin snout which may have been used for probing for invertebrates in mud or bark	
Rapaxavis	2009	Jiufotang Formation (Early Cretaceous, Aptian)	China	Specialized for perching due to the structure of its feet	
Shanweiniao	2009	Yixian Formation (Early Cretaceous, Aptian)	China	Acquired multiple tail feathers which may have been capable of generating lift as in modern birds	
Shengjingornis	2012	Jiufotang Formation (Early Cretaceous, Aptian)	China	A large member of the family	

=== Pengornithidae ===
The Pengornithidae was a family of large early Enantiornithes. They had numerous small teeth and numerous primitive features which are lost in most other Enantiornithes. Mostly known from the early Cretaceous of China, with putative Late Cretaceous taxa from Madagascar.

Name	Year	Formation	Location	Notes	Images
Chiappeavis	2015	Jiufotang Formation (Early Cretaceous, Aptian)	China	Possessed a fan-shaped tail composed of many feathers	
Eopengornis	2014	Huajiying Formation (Early Cretaceous, Hauterivian)	China	The oldest known member of the family, and one of the oldest putative genera of Enantiornithes known. Possessed extremely well-preserved tail ribbons	
Parapengornis	2015	Jiufotang Formation (Early Cretaceous, Aptian)	China	Proposed to have a woodpecker-like lifestyle due to features of the foot and tail	
Pengornis	2008	Jiufotang Formation (Early Cretaceous, Aptian)	China	The first pengornithid discovered, and also one of the largest members of the Enantiornithes known from decent remains	
Yuanchuavis	2021	Jiufotang Formation (Early Cretaceous, Aptian)	China	Possesses an elaborate "pintail" tail fan longer than its body, which may have had a display function	

=== Bohaiornithidae ===
Bohaiornithids were large but geologically short-lived early Enantiornithes, with long, hooked talons and robust teeth with curved tips. They may have been equivalent to birds of prey, although this interpretation is open to much debate. The monophyly of this group is doubtful, and it may actually be an evolutionary grade.

Name	Year	Formation	Location	Notes	Images
Beiguornis	2022	Longjiang Formation (Early Cretaceous, Aptian)	China	Had a short but robust manual ungual	
Bohaiornis	2011	Jiufotang Formation (Early Cretaceous, Aptian)	China	Originally considered to have been preserved with gastroliths, although later these were found to be mineral concretions	
Gretcheniao	2019	Yixian Formation (Early Cretaceous, Barremian)	China	Adapted for flapping, rather than soaring, flight. Its describers suggest paraphyly or polyphyly of Bohaiornithidae	
Linyiornis	2016	Jiufotang Formation (Early Cretaceous, Aptian)	China	A possible member of the family, known from a well-preserved skeleton complete with structures believed to be developing eggs	
Longusunguis	2014	Jiufotang Formation (Early Cretaceous, Aptian)	China	A fairly typical member of the family	
Neobohaiornis	2024	Jiufotang Formation (Early Cretaceous, Aptian)	China	Half the size of Bohaiornis	
Parabohaiornis	2014	Jiufotang Formation (Early Cretaceous, Aptian)	China	A close relative of Bohaiornis	
Plumadraco	2026	Jiufotang Formation (Early Cretaceous, Aptian)	China		
Shenqiornis	2010	Qiaotou member of the Huajiying Formation (Early Cretaceous, Aptian?)	China	The first known member of the family, although not considered a close relative of Bohaiornis until a few years later. Preserves a large postorbital bone	
Sulcavis	2013	Yixian Formation (Early Cretaceous, Aptian)	China	A close relative of Shenqiornis with grooved enamel on its teeth, unique among fossil birds	
Zhouornis	2013	Jiufotang Formation (Early Cretaceous, Aptian)	China	A large member of the family with a well-preserved braincase	

=== Gobipterygidae ===
Some members of the group are obscure or poorly described and may be synonymous with its type species, Gobipteryx minuta.

Name	Year	Formation	Location	Notes	Images
Gobipteryx	1974	Barun Goyot Formation (Late Cretaceous, Campanian)	Mongolia	A toothless advanced genus of Enantiornithes, possessing a robust beak which convergently evolved with those of modern birds	
Jibeinia	1997	Qiaotou member of the Huajiying Formation (Early Cretaceous, Aptian?)	China	Poorly known and described from a skeleton which has now been lost. May have been synonymous with Vescornis	
Vescornis	2004	Qiaotou member of the Huajiying Formation (Early Cretaceous, Aptian?)	China	A small and short-snouted genus of Enantiornithes which may be synonymous with Jibeinia	

=== Avisauridae ===
Avisauridae is subjected to two differing definitions of varying inclusiveness. The more inclusive definition, which follows Cau & Arduini (2008), is used here. Avisaurids were a long-lasting and widespread family of Enantiornithes, which are mainly distinguished by specific features of their tarsometatarsals (ankle bones). The largest and most advanced members of the group survived in North and South America up until the end of the Cretaceous, yet are very fragmentary compared to some earlier taxa.

Name	Year	Formation	Location	Notes	Images
Avisaurus	1985	Hell Creek Formation (Late Cretaceous, Maastrichtian)	United States (Montana)	The eponymous avisaurid, as well as one of the largest members of the family. Originally considered a non-avialan dinosaur	
Elsornis	2007	Djadochta Formation (Late Cretaceous, Campanian)	Mongolia	Although incomplete, its skeleton possesses three-dimensional preservation. Possibly flightless due to its wing proportions	
Enantiophoenix	2008	Ouadi al Gabour Formation (Late Cretaceous, Cenomanian)	Lebanon	Was once believed to have fed on tree sap as it was preserved in association with amber beads, however this was later determined as an artefact of preservation and not an indicator of diet	
Gettyia	2018	Two Medicine Formation (Late Cretaceous, Campanian)	United States (Montana)	A new genus for Avisaurus gloriae	
Halimornis	2002	Mooreville Chalk Formation (Late Cretaceous, Campanian)	United States (Alabama)	Would have lived in a coastal environment	
Intiornis	2010	Las Curtiembres Formation (Late Cretaceous, Campanian)	Argentina	Although closely related to some of the largest avisaurids, members of this genus were very small birds	
Mirarce	2018	Kaiparowits Formation (Late Cretaceous, Campanian)	United States (Utah)	The most complete known North American avisaurid	
Mystiornis	2011	Ilek Formation (Early Cretaceous, Barremian to Aptian)	Russia	Possesses a myriad of features from various groups in Paraves, although most closely resembles avisaurids among sampled groups	
Neuquenornis	1994	Bajo de la Carpa Formation (Late Cretaceous, Santonian)	Argentina	Possessed long wings and a reverse hallux, indicating good flight and perching abilities	
Soroavisaurus	1993	Lecho Formation (Late Cretaceous, Maastrichtian)	Argentina	A very close relative of Avisaurus	

=== Dubious genera and notable unnamed specimens ===
- Gobipipus reshetovi: Described in 2013 from embryo specimens within eggshells from the Barun Goyot Formation of Mongolia. These specimens were very similar to embryonic Gobipteryx specimens, although the describers of Gobipipus (a set of controversial paleontologists including Evgeny Kurochkin and Sankar Chatterjee) consider it distinct.
- Hebeiornis fengningensis: A synonym of Vescornis due to having been described from the same specimen. Despite having been described in 1999, 5 years prior to the description of Vescornis, the description was so poor compared to the description of Vescornis that the latter name is considered to take priority by most authors. As a result, the name Hebeiornis is considered a nomen nudum ("naked name").
- "Proornis" is an informally-named bird from North Korea. It may not be a member of Enantiornithes.
- Liaoxiornis delicatus: Described in 1999 from a specimen of Enantiornithes found in the Yixian Formation. This specimen was originally considered to be a tiny adult, but later found to be a hatchling. Other specimens have henceforth been assigned to the genus. Due to a lack of distinguishing feature, many paleontologists have considered this genus an undiagnostic nomen dubium.
- "Wasaibpanchi": A supposed member of Enantiornithes from Pakistan; the describing paper is of dubious status.
- LP-4450: A juvenile of an indeterminate specimen of Enantiornithes from the El Montsec Formation of Spain. Its 2006 description studied the histology of the skeleton, while later studies reported a squamosal bone present in the specimen but unknown in other Enantiornithes.
- IVPP V 13939: Briefly described in 2004, this Yixian Enantiornithes specimen had advanced pennaceous feathers on its legs, similar to (albeit shorter than) those of other paravians such as Microraptor and Anchiornis.
- DIP-V-15100 and DIP-V-15101: Two different wings from hatchling specimens which were described in 2015. They attracted a significant amount of media attention upon their description. They were preserved in exceptional details due to having been trapped within Burmese amber for approximately 99 million years.
- HPG-15-1: A partial corpse of an Enantiornithes hatchling also preserved in Burmese amber. Although indeterminate, it attracted even more media attention than the two wings upon its description in 2017.
- CUGB P1202: An indeterminate juvenile bohaiornithid from the Jiufotang Formation. A 2016 analysis of its feathering found elongated putative melanosomes, suggesting that a large portion of its feathering was iridescent.
- DIP-V-15102: Another corpse of an indeterminate hatchling preserved in Burmese amber. Described in early 2018.
- MPCM-LH-26189 a/b: A partial skeleton of a hatchling from Las Hoyas in Spain, including both slab and counter-slab components. Its 2018 description revealed how various features developed in Enantiornithes as they aged. Such features include the ossification of the sternum from various smaller bones, and the fusion of tail vertebrae into a pygostyle.
