= Piscivorenantiornis =

Scientific classification
- Kingdom: Animalia
- Phylum: Chordata
- Class: Reptilia
- Clade: Dinosauria
- Clade: Saurischia
- Clade: Theropoda
- Clade: Avialae
- Clade: †Enantiornithes
- Genus: †Piscivorenantiornis; Wang, Zhou & Sullivan, 2016

Type species
- Piscivorenantiornis inusitatus Wang, Zhou & Sullivan, 2016

Extinct genus of birds

Piscivorenantiornis is a genus of enantiornithine bird from the Jiufotang Formation of Liaoning, China. It is known from a single species, P. insusitatus.

== History of discovery ==
The holotype of Piscivorenantiornis (IVPP V22582), was discovered near Dapingfang in Chaoyang County, Liaoning, China, in sediments identified as belonging to the Jiufotang Formation. Piscivoreantiornis' genus name is derived from the Latin piscis ("fish") and vorare ("to eat"), denoting it as the first known piscivorous enantiornithine; the specific name derives from the Latin inusitatus ("extraordinary"). A second specimen of P. inusitatus (IVPP V23362) was described in 2020.

== Description ==
Piscivorenantiornis was a small enantiornithine. The sternum resembles bohaiornithids in some regards, though its lateral trabecula lacks the strong lateral deflection that characterises them. It preserves a pair of craniolateral processes absent in most other enantiornithines. The articular sulci of the coracoid are widely spaced. The pubic boot is large and its tip is strongly recurved.

== Taxonomy ==
In the paper describing Piscivorenantiornis, it nested either alongside Pterygornis, or outside of a clade comprising Pterygornis and Dunhuangia. In a paper published four years later, it was recovered in outside of a clade comprising Mirusavis and Shangyang.

== Paleobiology ==
The holotype of Piscivorenantiornis was found alongside a spindle-shaped arrangement of fish bones, likely belonging to the genus Lycoptera. Due to its shape and proximity, and a lack of fish bones elsewhere on the slab, it is believed that this structure represents a gastric pellet that was regurgitated shortly prior to its death.
