= Grabauornis =

Grabauornis Temporal range: Aptian ~125 Ma

Scientific classification
- Domain: Eukaryota
- Kingdom: Animalia
- Phylum: Chordata
- Clade: Dinosauria
- Clade: Saurischia
- Clade: Theropoda
- Clade: Avialae
- Clade: †Enantiornithes
- Clade: †Euenantiornithes
- Genus: †Grabauornis; Dalsätt et al., 2014
- Species: †G. lingyuanensis

Binomial name
- †Grabauornis lingyuanensis Dalsätt et al., 2014

Extinct genus of dinosaurs

Grabauornis is an extinct genus of enantiornitheans from the Early Cretaceous of China.

The type species, Grabauornis lingyuanensis, was named and described in 2014 by Johan Dalsätt, Per Ericson and Zhou Zhonghe. The genus name combines a reference to Amadeus William Grabau with the Greek word ὄρνις, which means bird. The specific name refers to the place where it was found; the city of Lingyuan in the Lianoning province of China. Dalsät already referred to the descriptive article in 2012, before it was published, in his dissertation and the name Grabauornis was mentioned with it. However it was still an invalid nomen ex dissertatione. In addition, he explicitly stated that he did not want to perform naming acts, if they are not performed validly.

The fossil, holotype IVPP V14595, was found in a layer of the Yixian Formation which dates to the Aptian, at an age of 125 million years. The holotype consists of a well-preserved skeleton, compressed onto a single plate.

Grabauornis shows a unique combination of differentiating traits. The center of the back of the sternum plate extends further back than the side wings, the latter are fan-shaped. It also has a relatively short head with small, conical teeth. As for the arms and hands; the second and third phalanges of the second finger are quite robust, the third metacarpal extends further than the second and the hand is shorter than the ulna. Besides that, the shoulder blade is long and narrow and tapers towards the top.

Grabauornis has a humerus that is 95% of the length of the ulna. In most enantiornitheans the values are between 77 and 125%, so Grabauornis has an average ratio. According to the descriptors, this indicates a good ability to fly; only above 130% the animal would have to remain on the ground. This ability would be confirmed by the possession of an alula, a thumb feather that could serve as a nose vane. The hypocleidium of the wishbone is also well developed.
