= Monoenantiornis =

Monoenantiornis Temporal range: Early Cretaceous

Scientific classification
- Domain: Eukaryota
- Kingdom: Animalia
- Phylum: Chordata
- Clade: Dinosauria
- Clade: Saurischia
- Clade: Theropoda
- Clade: Avialae
- Clade: †Enantiornithes
- Genus: †Monoenantiornis
- Species: †M. sihedangia

Binomial name
- †Monoenantiornis sihedangia Hu & O'Connor, 2017

Extinct genus of birds

Monoenantiornis is an extinct genus of enantiornithean that inhabited China during the Cretaceous period. It is a monotypic genus known from the species M. sihedangia.
