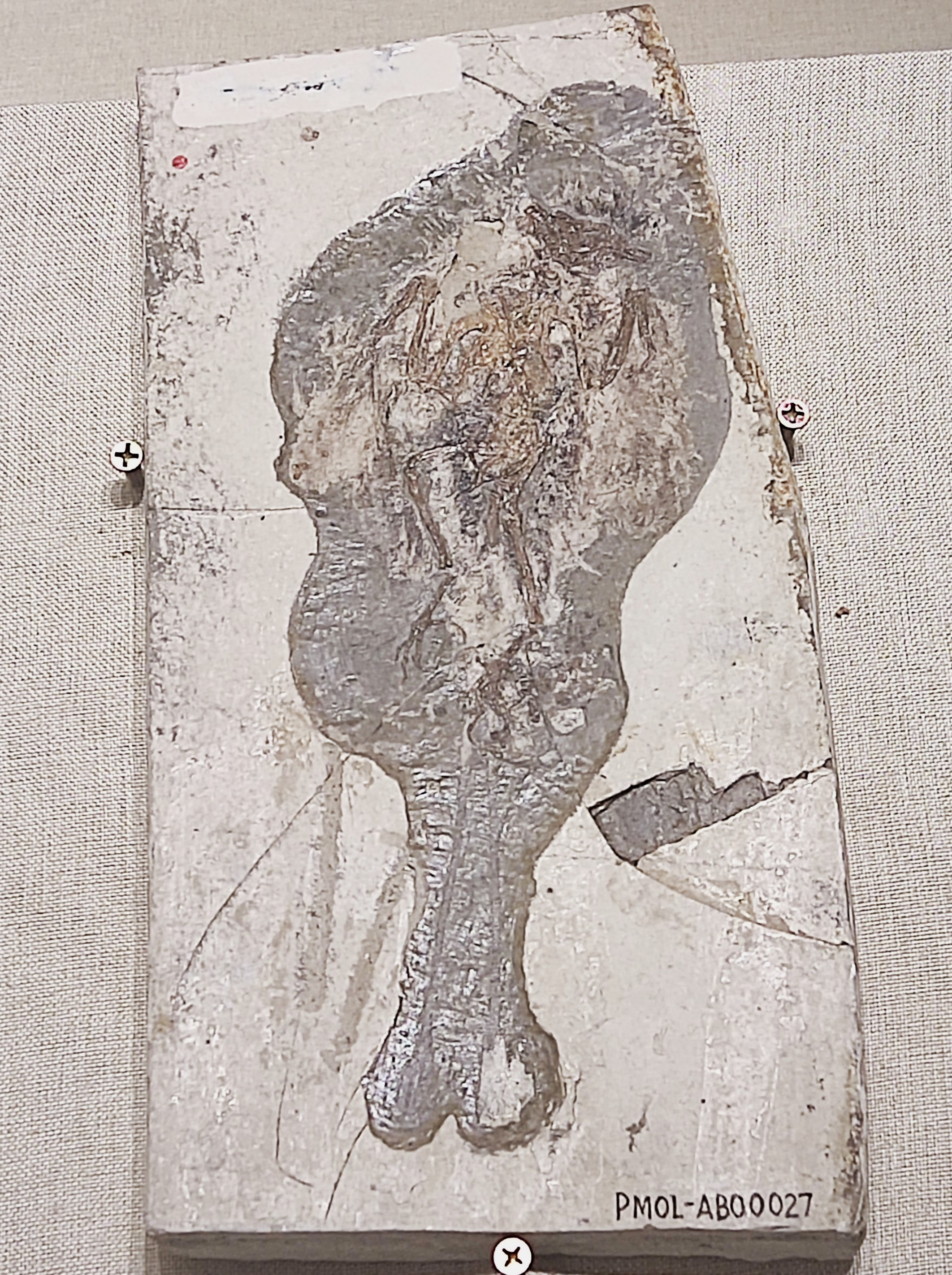
- Fossil in Liaoning Palaeontological Museum

Scientific classification
- Kingdom: Animalia
- Phylum: Chordata
- Class: Reptilia
- Clade: Dinosauria
- Clade: Saurischia
- Clade: Theropoda
- Clade: Avialae
- Clade: †Enantiornithes
- Genus: †Dapingfangornis; Li et al., 2006
- Species: †D. sentisorhinus

Binomial name
- †Dapingfangornis sentisorhinus Li et al., 2006

= Dapingfangornis =

Dapingfangornis Temporal range: Early Cretaceous, 120 Ma

Extinct genus of birds

Dapingfangornis was an enantiornithean bird. It lived during the Early Cretaceous and is known from fossils—including a complete skeleton—found in the Jiufotang Formation in Liaoning province, People's Republic of China. Small to medium-sized, it had a sternum with both long and short lateral processes, and a unique thornlike process on its nares.
