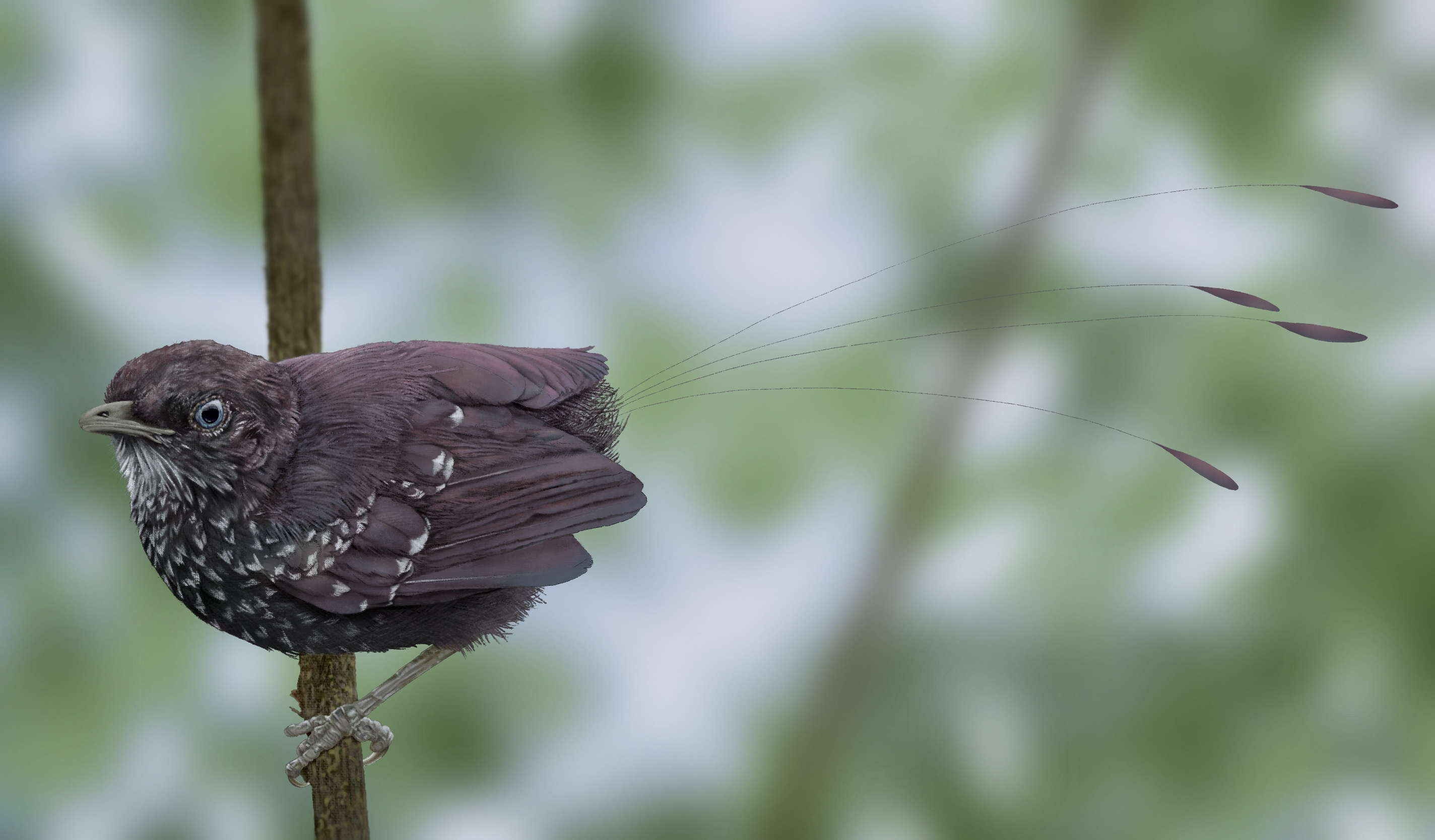
- Life reconstruction of Parvavis chuxiongensis

Scientific classification
- Kingdom: Animalia
- Phylum: Chordata
- Class: Reptilia
- Clade: Dinosauria
- Clade: Saurischia
- Clade: Theropoda
- Clade: Avialae
- Clade: †Enantiornithes
- Genus: †Parvavis; Wang et al., 2014
- Species: †P. chuxiongensis

Binomial name
- †Parvavis chuxiongensis Wang et al., 2014

= Parvavis =

Parvavis Temporal range: Late Cretaceous

Extinct genus of birds

Parvavis is a genus of enantiornithean bird, known from the upper Cretaceous (Turonian–Santonian) of China in the Jiangdihe Formation. The type and only species, Parvavis chuxiongensis, was recovered in Luojumei Village, Chuxiong City, Yunnan Province, southern China, and it was the only known Mesozoic bird from south China at the time of its discovery. Based on its bone structure, the holotype was determined to be nearly fully grown at its time of death and would have been smaller than Iberomesornis, the smallest known enantiornithine prior to the description of Parvavis.

== History of Discovery ==
In 2010, the skeleton of a small bird was found near Luojumei, a village close to the city of Chuxiong in the Yunnan province of China, and in 2014 the type species Parvavis chuxiongensis was named and described by Wang Min, Zhou Zhonghe and Xu Guanghui. The genus name is derived from the Latin prefix “parvus”, which means small, and “avis” which means bird. The specific name refers to the location where the fossil was found, near the city of Chuxiong. Parvavis is the first bird known from the Upper-Cretaceous of China and the first mesozoic bird from Southern China.

The fossil, holotype IVPP V18586/1, was found in lake deposits of the Jiangdihe formation. It consists of a partially complete and articulated skeleton with parts of the skull and impressions of feathers on some of the rock. Of the spine, only the tail and pygostyle were preserved, and of the skull only the back. Furthermore, histological research suggests the animal was close to adult size when it died, but that it was unusually small in size for an enantiornithean. This highlights the highly variable body sizes in this group of animals.

== Description ==
Parvavis is, like the genus name suggests, a small bird with a wingspan of about 15 centimeters. Other than the wingspan, the descriptors of the animal managed to identify a couple of differentiating characteristics, like the fact that the bottom joint of the second metatarsal is wider than those of the other metatarsals. The other two characteristics they identified are that the bottoms of the second and fourth metatarsals do not reach the hinge surfaces of the third metatarsal, and the fact that the claw on the fourth toe is reduced.

The latter two characteristics aren't unique on their own, but they are unique in combination with the first one.

== Classification ==
Cladistic analyses put Parvavis in a relatively basal position within the Enantiornithes, outside Longipterygidae. This indicates that these basal forms existed for much longer than previously suspected.
