= Holbotia =

Holbotia Temporal range: Early Cretaceous

Scientific classification
- Kingdom: Animalia
- Phylum: Chordata
- Class: Reptilia
- Clade: Dinosauria
- Clade: Saurischia
- Clade: Theropoda
- Clade: Avialae
- Clade: †Enantiornithes
- Genus: †Holbotia
- Species: †H. ponomarenkoi

Binomial name
- †Holbotia ponomarenkoi Zelenkov and Averianov, 2016

Extinct genus of enantiornithean dinosaur

Holbotia is an extinct monotypic genus of enantiornithean bird that lived in Mongolia during the Early Cretaceous epoch. It contains the single species Holbotia ponomarenkoi.

== Etymology ==
The generic name Holbotia is in reference to the locality at which the holotype was found. The specific epithet of the type and only species, Holbotia ponomarenkoi, honours the palaeoentomologist Alexander G. Ponomarenko, the discoverer of the type specimen.
