= Linyiornis =

Linyiornis Temporal range: Early Cretaceous

Scientific classification
- Kingdom: Animalia
- Phylum: Chordata
- Class: Reptilia
- Clade: Dinosauria
- Clade: Saurischia
- Clade: Theropoda
- Clade: Avialae
- Clade: †Enantiornithes
- Genus: †Linyiornis
- Species: †L. amoena

Binomial name
- †Linyiornis amoena Wang et al., 2016

Extinct genus of birds

Linyiornis is an extinct genus of enantiornithean that inhabited China during the Early Cretaceous epoch. It is a monotypic genus known from the species L. amoena.
