= Yijinholuo Formation =

Geological formation in Inner Mongolia, China

- Stratigraphic range: Early Cretaceous
- Type: Geological formation

Location
- Region: Asia

The Yijinholuo Formation is a geological formation in Inner Mongolia, China whose strata date back to the Early Cretaceous. Dinosaur remains are among the fossils that have been recovered from the formation.

== Vertebrate paleofauna ==
- Otogornis genghisi - "Shoulder girdle forelimb elements."

== See also ==
- List of dinosaur-bearing rock formations
