= Yuanjiawaornis =

Yuanjiawaornis Temporal range: Early Cretaceous

Scientific classification
- Kingdom: Animalia
- Phylum: Chordata
- Class: Reptilia
- Clade: Dinosauria
- Clade: Saurischia
- Clade: Theropoda
- Clade: Avialae
- Clade: †Enantiornithes
- Genus: †Yuanjiawaornis; Hu et al., 2015

Type species
- †Yuanjiawaornis viriosus Hu et al., 2015.

Extinct genus of bird

Yuanjiawaornis is an extinct genus of large enantiornithean bird known from the early Cretaceous of present-day China. It is monotypic, with only type species Y. virisosus named.

Excavated in 2005 by a museum team in the famous fossil-bearing layers of Liaoning, it was named in 2015. Apart from its size, the build of Yuanjiawaornis is not exceptional. The exact relationships of the bird are uncertain, largely because the skull has not been found. Also the plumage is absent from the fossil.

== History of Discovery ==
In 2005, near the village of Yuanjiawa, near the town of Dapingfang in Chaoyang in western Liaoning province, the fossil of a bird was unearthed. Exceptionally, this was done by a paleontologist and not by the illegal fossil trade, which poaches by far the majority of fossils in the area.

In 2015, the type species Yuanjiawaornis viriosus was named and described by Hu Dongyu, Liu Ying, Li Jinhua, Xu Xing and Hou Lianhai. The genus name connects the name of the finding site with the Ancient Greek ornis, "bird". The specific name means "powerful" in Latin and refers to its relatively large body size.

The holotype, PMOL AB00032, has been found in the Yuanjiawa strata of the Jiufotang Formation dating to the Aptian, about 120 million years old. It consists of a skeleton without a skull, flattened on a plate. Apart from the skull, the cervical vertebrae, the frontal vertebrae, and most of the phalanges of the fingers and toes are missing. The fossil is largely articulated, although the pelvis has shifted. Nothing of the plumage has been preserved, which is exceptional for bird fossils from Liaoning. However, the pelvis is partly covered by what appears to be a layer of preserved soft tissue. It is probably a young adult specimen. It is part of the collection of the Paleontological Museum of Liaoning, which also collected and prepared it.

== Description ==
=== Size and distinguishing characteristics ===
Yuanjiawaornis is a remarkably large species. Most enantiornitheans are sparrow- or starling-sized birds, but Yuanjiawaornis must have had a wingspan of nearly half a metre. The femur has a length of forty-three millimetres. That makes the species about the same size as Zhouornis and only slightly smaller than Pengornis, considered to be a giant among the Chinese enantiornitheans from the Lower Cretaceous.

No autapomorphies, unique derived features of Yuanjiawaornis, could be determined. However, there was an unusual combination of non-unique characteristics. The body size is large. The wings and hindlimbs are roughly the same length. The synsacrum shows a longitudinal groove on the underside instead of ridges. The last vertebra of the sacrum has robust and long lateral processes, rather than the penultimate vertebra. The scapula has a processus acromialis that tapers obliquely to the front and above. The lateral edge of the coracoid is straight instead of convex. The branches of the wishbone turn towards each other, tapering instead of running parallel with a widening. The sternum has an oval profile, while the outer posterior processes are slightly widened at their tip instead of having an angular profile or being strongly widened processes. The head of the humerus is flat rather than convex or concave. The deltopectoral crest of the humerus gradually merges with the shaft downward rather than abruptly.

=== Skeleton ===
The fossil preserves seven vertebrae. These have neural processes with tips touching each other. The sacrum is fully fused to a synsacrum that has been detached from the fossil and is clearly visible from the underside. Its convex anterior facet is wider than that of the middle sacral vertebrae, but the latter is not extremely transversely pinched. The authors pay special attention to the fact that while in older theropods the middle of the sacrum is widened to bear the weight, it is narrower in enantiornitheans. The synsacrum has a sharp longitudinal groove over its entire underside. The lateral proces of the posterior sacral vertebrae is robust but not extremely so. The base of the tail consists of six amphicoelous "free" vertebrae with long lateral processes directed backwards. The tip of the tail is fused into a short tapering pygostyle.

On the scapula, the processus acromialis is angled upwards instead of running in line with the blade, if the element is held horizontally, as was indeed the case in the living animal. The process is about as long as the shoulder joint facet. On the wishbone, the branches make an angle of 45° with each other, whereas 60° is normal for relatives. Because the outer edge of each branch is hollowed out, the branches are much narrower at the top than at the bottom; in some relatives this is the other way round. The thin upper rims continue over the hypocleidium so that this process has a cross-section like an inverted T.

The fact that the branches are tapered does not mean that there is a weak connection with the scapulae: the top of the tip has a swelling and the processus acromialis of the scapula protrudes with its tip into a concave facet in that bulge, a morphology unique to Yuanjiawaornis. The sternum is wider than long, with a convex leading edge. The sword-shaped process at the centre of the hind edge is wider than the processes at the outer corners; in most relatives, they are the same width. All three processes project to the rear at about the same distance. The outer processes are only slightly broadened at their ends, while they usually end in a fan shape. The intermediate processes at the rear edge are remarkably well developed. They end in a point and curve slightly inwards.

Arm and hindleg have approximately the same length, as in most Enantiornithes. That the upper surface of the humerus is flat is quite exceptional, but that the deltopectoral ridge gradually mergesb with the shaft is quite normal. The ulna is slightly longer than the humerus at fifty-three millimetres. The straight and half as wide radius has a groove on the side of the interspace with the ulna, as do some relatives. The hand is not fused in the holotype, a sign that it was a young adult specimen.

The lower leg forms a fused tibiotarsus over five centimetres long. On the tibia a prominent crista fibularis is present. The fibula is relatively short, stretching over the upper 30% of the tibia and ending in a tapering point to below. The first metatarsal is P-shaped in internal view and not warped around the longitudinal axis. The second metatarsal is the widest element of the metatarsus and clearly longer than the fourth metatarsal. At the lower hinge joint of the third metatarsal, the inner edge projects more strongly towards the sole side than the outer edge, as in Soroavisaurus and Neuquenornis. The fourth metatarsal has no hinge joint but ends in a rounded tip that allows the toe more lateral freedom of movement. The first pedal ungual, which was directed backwards, is robust and strongly curved. Another preserved foot claw of uncertain position is straighter.

== Phylogeny ==
No exact cladistic analysis of Yuanjiawaornis was published in 2015. The authors limited its phylogenetic position to a general Enantiornithes. They deduced this from the possession of several typical enantiornithean features. The parapophyses, the facets for the lower rib heads, are centred on the sides of the vertebrae. The coracoid has a convex interface with the scapula and an upper groove. The wishbone is Y-shaped with a long anterior point (hypocleidium). The sternum has a parabolic leading edge and paired posterior lateral processes. The radius has a longitudinal groove on the side of the gap with the ulna. The second metatarsal is wider transversely than the third, which is wider than the fourth.
