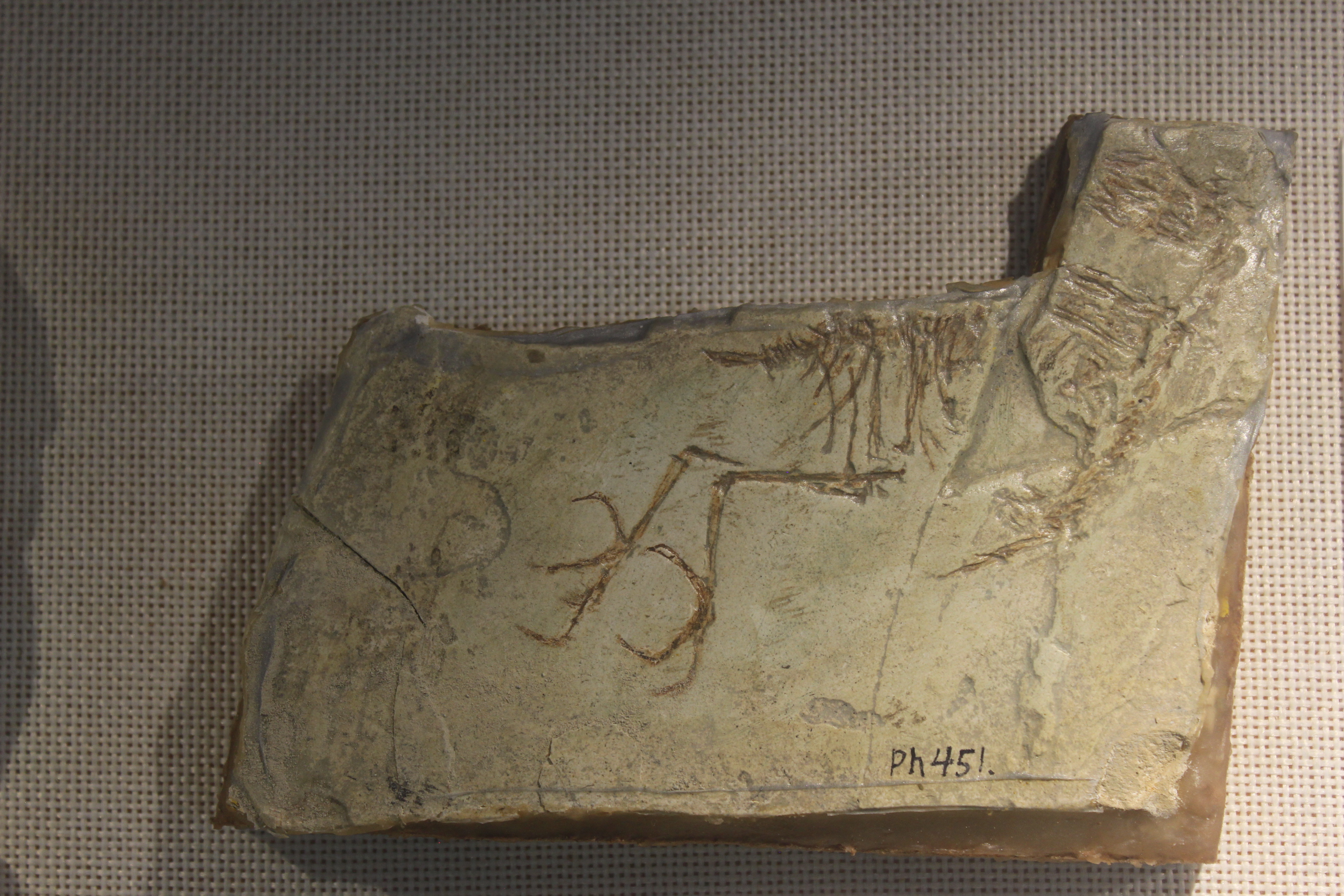
- Fossil specimen, Beijing Museum of Natural History

Scientific classification
- Kingdom: Animalia
- Phylum: Chordata
- Class: Reptilia
- Clade: Dinosauria
- Clade: Saurischia
- Clade: Theropoda
- Clade: Avialae
- Clade: †Enantiornithes
- Genus: †Sinornis; Sereno & Rao, 1992
- Species: †S. santensis

Binomial name
- †Sinornis santensis Sereno & Rao, 1992

= Sinornis =

Sinornis Temporal range: Early Cretaceous, 120 Ma

Extinct genus of birds

Sinornis is a genus of enantiornithean birds from the Lower Cretaceous Jiufotang Formation of the People's Republic of China.

When it was described in 1992, this 120 million-year-old sparrow-sized skeleton represented a new avian sharing "primitive" features with Archaeopteryx as well as showing traits of modern birds. Its basal features include, but are not limited to, a flexible manus with unguals, a footed pubis, and stomach ribs. Sinornis is known only from the type species, Sinornis santensis. The generic name comes from the Latin Sino~, 'China' and the Greek ornis, 'bird'. The specific name santensis refers to the provenance from Chaoyang county in Liaoning Province as Santa, meaning "Three Temples", is a traditional name of the county.

== Description ==
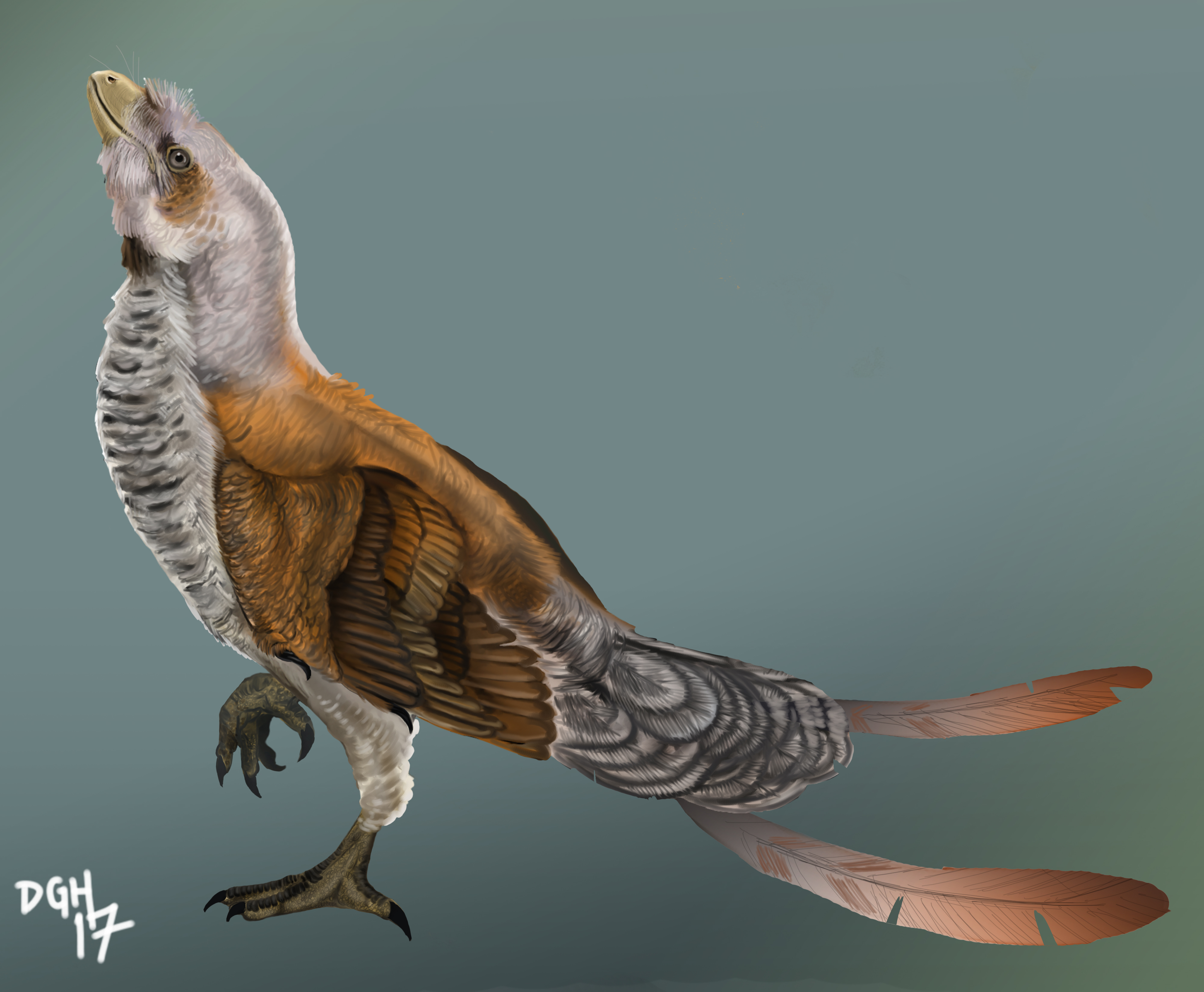
Life restoration

The holotype skeleton of Sinornis, BPV 538a-b, consists of a plate and counterplate of fine-grained freshwater lake sediment as proven by numerous fish, insect, and plant remains. The skeleton was found in the Jiufotang Formation at Liaoning, People's Republic of China. The skeleton exhibits remarkable basal features shared with Archaeopteryx, a genus of early bird that is transitional between older feathered dinosaurs and modern birds. Until the discovery of Sinornis scientists did not know much about the evolution of flight that led to modern birds because Archaeopteryx, which lived in the Late Jurassic period around 150 million years ago, lacks many of the adaptations of modern birds for flight and perching. Some of the primitive features found in Sinornis include moderately recurved manual unguals, as opposed to the high-recurved one in Archaeopteryx. Sinornis shares a similar pelvis with the latter genus, but its pelvic girdle has free elements unlike the fused ones found in modern birds. The iliac blades are erect and the ischium is blade-shaped rather than strap-shaped. Analogous to Archaeopteryx and older theropod dinosaurs, its pubis appears to be directed more ventrally and terminates distally in a hook-shaped "boot".

=== Skeleton ===
As in Archaeopteryx, the skull of Sinornis has a proportionately short, toothed snout. There are broad nasal bones that expands caudally to the external nares, with a triangular caudal margin. The dorsal and central margins of the caudal half of the maxilla run parallel while its jugal ramus does not taper caudally.

The postcranial skeleton features a separate carpus and manus in the forelimb. The manus, hand, is composed of freely articulating metacarpals, with well-formed phalanges and unguals on the first and second digits. The thorax is closed at the underside, by gastralia. The pelvis has a footed pubis.

=== Flight and perching ===
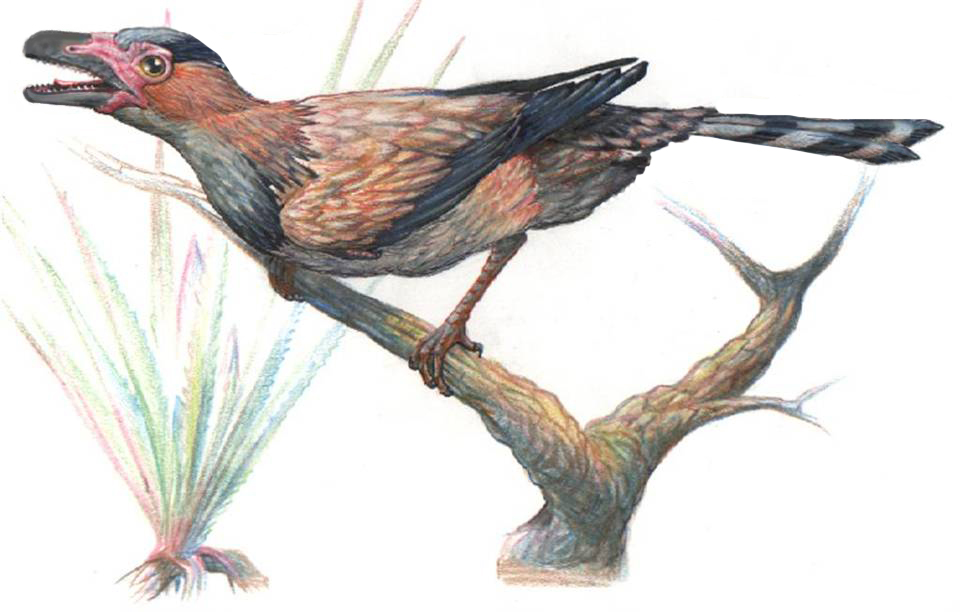
Restoration of Sinornis perching

Derived bird traits in the skeleton of Sinornis are typically flight or perching adaptations. At a time when very few intermediary forms were known, the fossil seemed to provide an early glimpse of flight evolution, showing the intermediate evolutionary step between the "primitive" wings of Archaeopteryx to specialized wings of modern birds. As in modern birds, Sinornis had a modified wrist bone, with a groove that lets the wrist bend sharply back, tightly tucking the wings during flight or rest. Sinornis was capable of flight similar to modern birds based on breastbone and shoulder structures that provided both room and support for bulky aerobic flight muscles. It also had reduced claws and small hands with a stable second finger that anchored important flight feathers. Unlike the fused finger bones of modern birds, Sinornis had separate finger bones that were well adapted for flight, while the reduction of the tail moved the centre of gravity forwards. Sinornis was also capable of perching and climbing.

== Discovery ==
Discovered by a Chinese farmer prior to 1992, the fossil of Sinornis sheds light on the evolutionary steps that transitioned birds into strong, specialized flyers. Paul Sereno of the University of Chicago and his colleague Rao Chenggang of the Beijing Natural History Museum were the first to name and describe the skeleton of Sinornis.

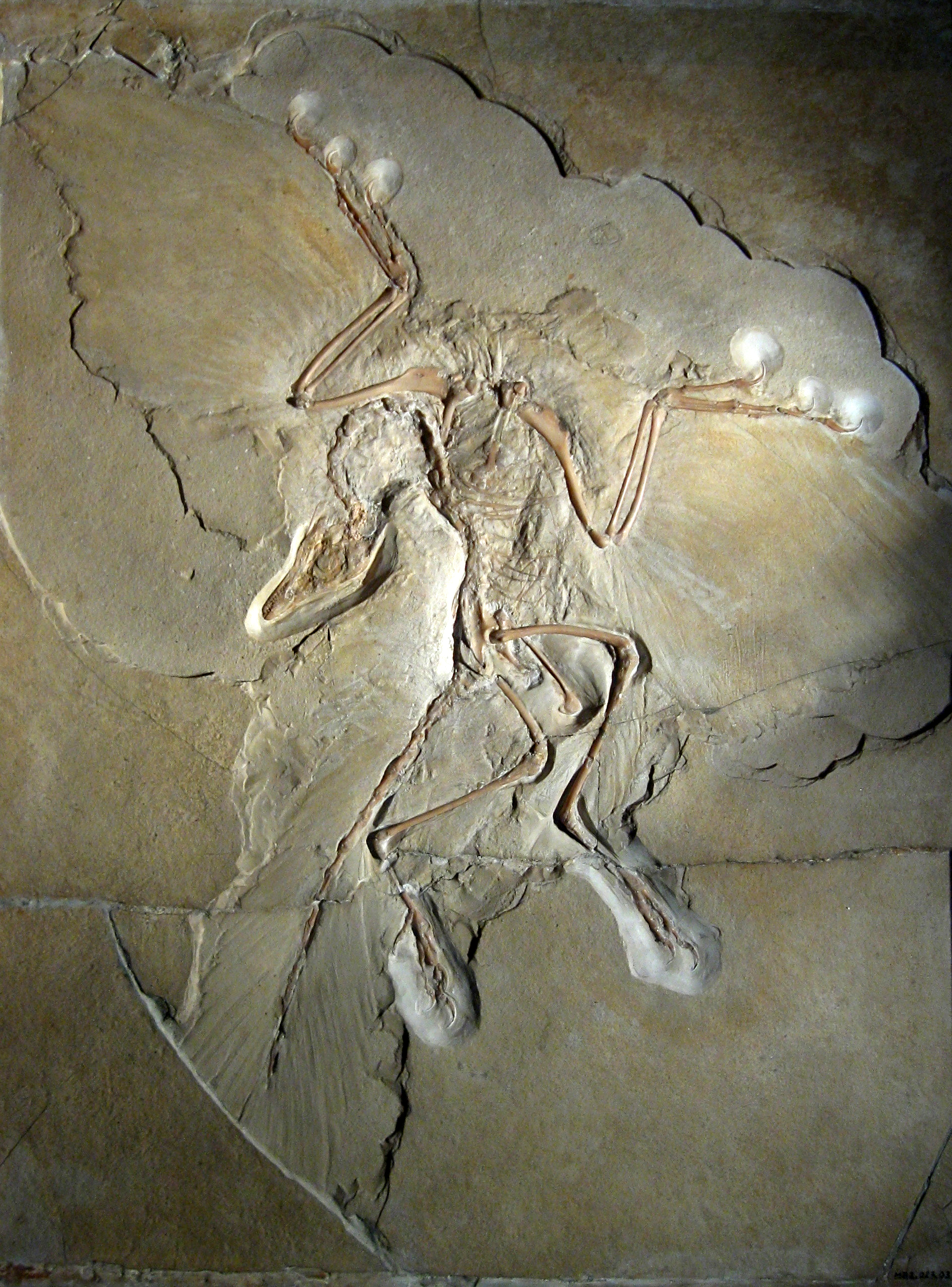
Fossil of Archaeopteryx, whose traits are found in a more basal form within Sinornis

Before this find much of what scientists knew about the origin of birds came from Archaeopteryx, a Jurassic species with a confusing mix of reptilian and bird-like traits. Sinornis shared many traits with modern birds while retaining certain basal characteristics of Archaeopteryx, so that in 1992 it could be presented as the missing link in avian evolution. There were other fossils discovered before Sinornis that were younger than Archaeopteryx, but Sinornis skeleton was the most complete. The fossil of Sinornis was originally dated to about 135 million years, which seemed to show that about 15 million years after Archaeopteryx the transition to the modern wing was well underway. However, later research showed that the layers in which the fossil was found were in fact about 120 to 110 million years old, reducing the importance of Sinornis. After the discovery of Sinornis, older fossils were discovered that shared even more basal features with Archaeopteryx.

== Classification ==
Paul Sereno et al. (2001) considered a similar prehistoric bird species from the same formation, Cathayornis, to be a junior synonym of Sinornis. They interpreted the anatomies of the two as very similar and sharing key autapomorphies of the pygostyle.

However, also in 2001, Zhou and Hou continued to distinguish Cathayornis from Sinornis by the former's larger size, a shorter, straighter, finger number I, with a slightly longer claw (ungual), the absence of an atitrochanter, and other features. A paper describing a second species of Cathayornis in 2008 by Li et al. also considered the genera to be distinct.

The first thorough review of Sinornis and Cathayornis was published by Jingmai O'Connor and Gareth Dyke in 2010. O'Connor and Dyke concluded that despite the 2001 paper by Sereno and colleagues, the two birds were not synonyms and in fact differ in several clear ways, including different proportions in the wing claws and digits, differences in the pelvis, and size of the pygostyle.

The holotype skeleton of both Cathayornis y. and Sinornis was discovered in China, but in different regions. Their skeletons are small, so they were preserved similarly using molds and casts to facilitate the study the specimens.

== Paleobiology ==
Sinornis, the most complete known enantiornithean at the time, provides a detailed view of basal avian characteristics. Based on features present on the preserved skeleton of Sinornis, it shared similarity in flight performance and perching capabilities to sparrow-sized birds living today in arboreal habitats. Its thorax is strengthened to resist forces generated by an increase in pectoral muscle mass. Its coracoid expands distally to form broad, lengthened struts attached to the sternum. It also had a robust cranial rib and ossified sternal ribs. It has a V-shaped ulnare in the wrist for articulation with the metacarpus which allowed greater flexion during upstroke, important in small-bodied fliers for decreasing drag. The presence of a fully opposable hallux with a particularly large ungual and the pedal claws being strongly recurved are indicators of an advanced perching function and shows that the bird lived primarily in an arboreal habitat.
