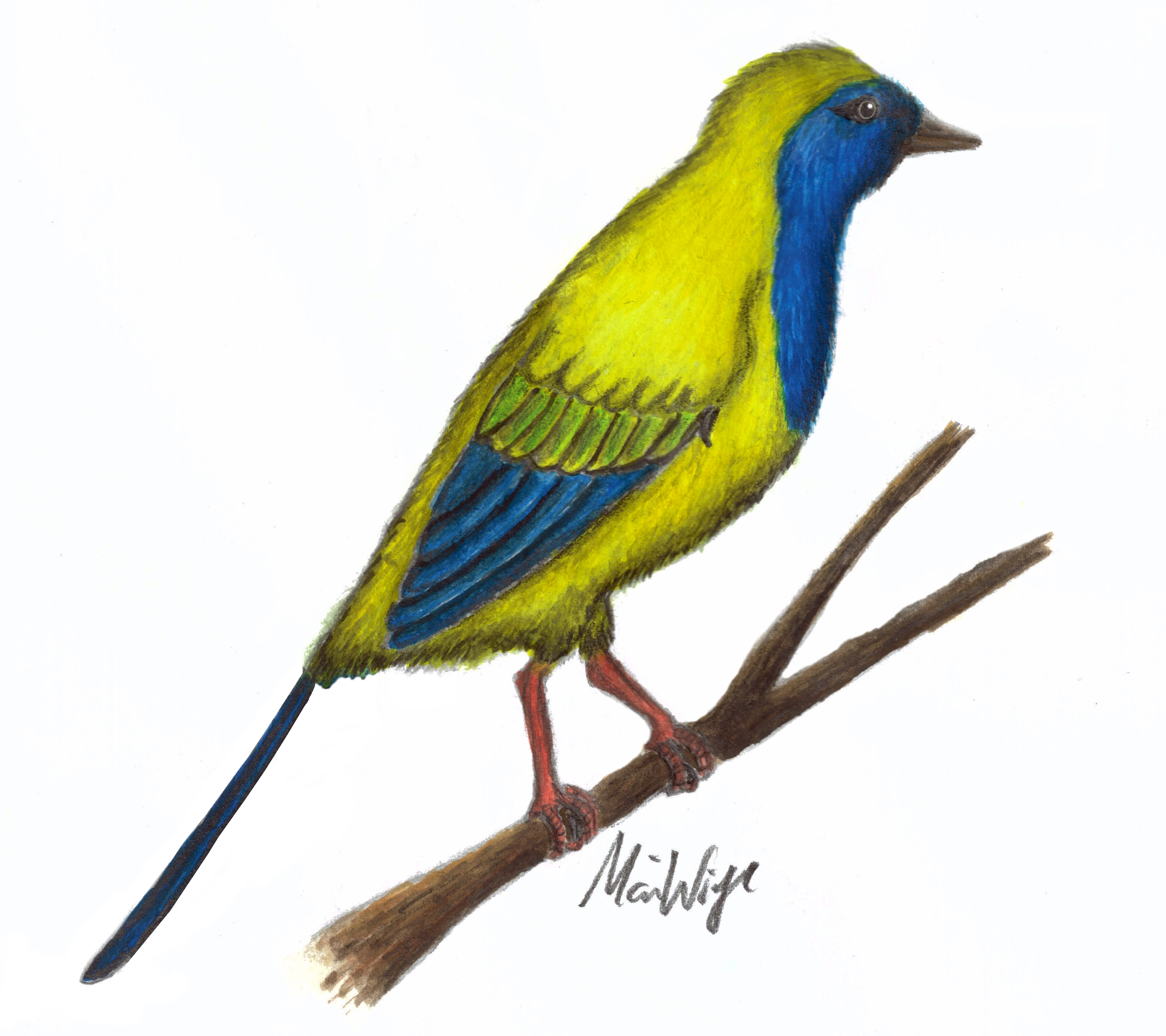

Scientific classification
- Kingdom: Animalia
- Phylum: Chordata
- Class: Reptilia
- Clade: Dinosauria
- Clade: Saurischia
- Clade: Theropoda
- Clade: Avialae
- Clade: †Enantiornithes
- Genus: †Liaoxiornis; Hou & Chen, 1999
- Species: †L. delicatus

Binomial name
- †Liaoxiornis delicatus Hou & Chen, 1999

Synonyms
- Lingyuanornis Ji & Ji 1999; Lingyuanornis parvus Ji & Ji 1999

= Liaoxiornis =

Liaoxiornis Temporal range: Early Cretaceous, 122 Ma

Extinct genus of birds

Liaoxiornis is a dubious genus of enantiornithean bird. The only named species is Liaoxiornis delicatus, described by Hou and Chen in 1999. Because the species was named for a hatchling specimen, it cannot be matched with adult specimens, and so it is impossible to determine which, if any, birds from the same rocks represent adults of this species. Luis Chiappe and colleagues therefore regarded it as a nomen vanum ("empty name") or at least a nomen dubium, and recommended that use of the name be abandoned.

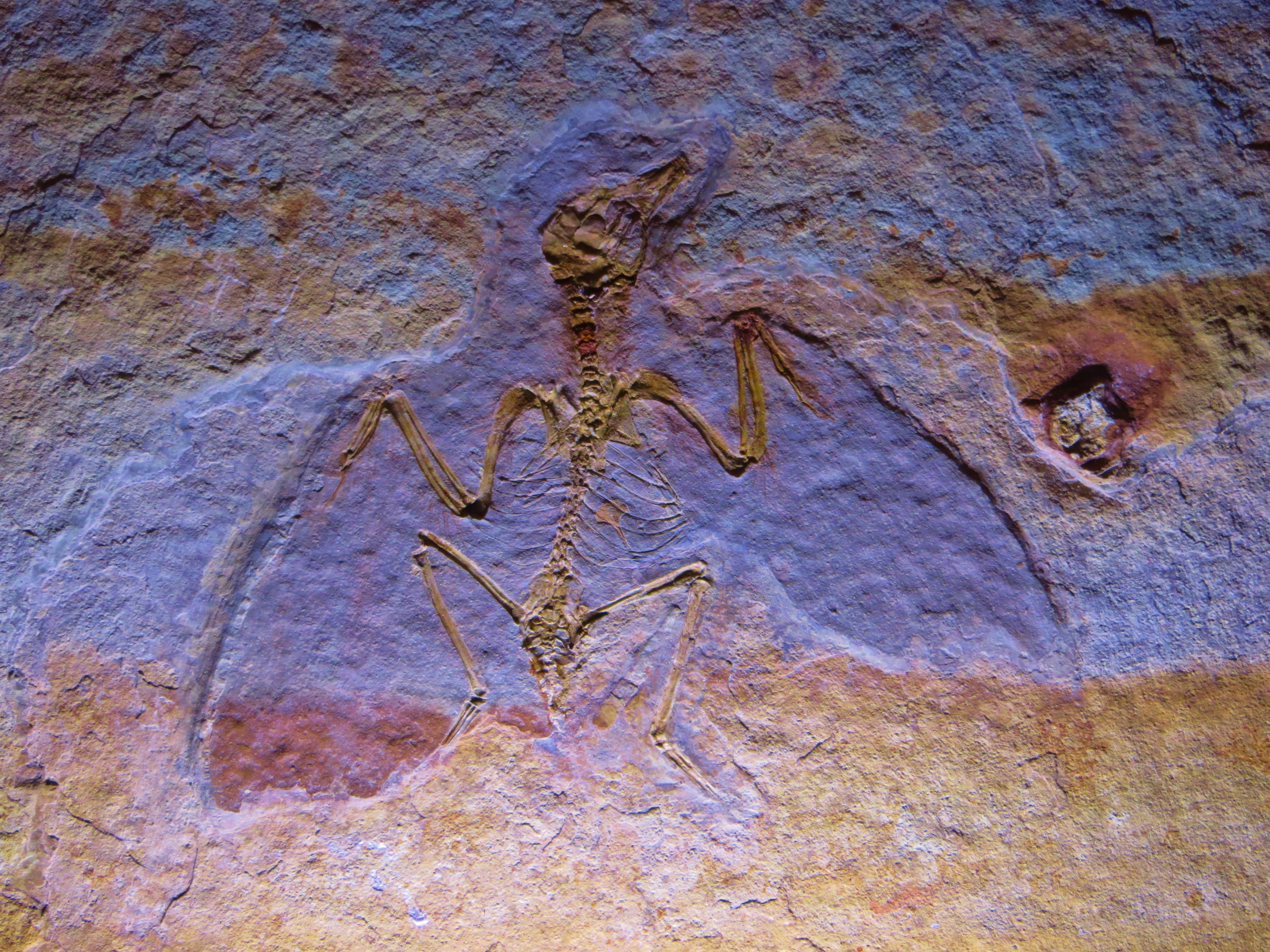
Fossil of Liaoxiornis delicatus, at Museo di Storia Naturale di Venezia, Venice

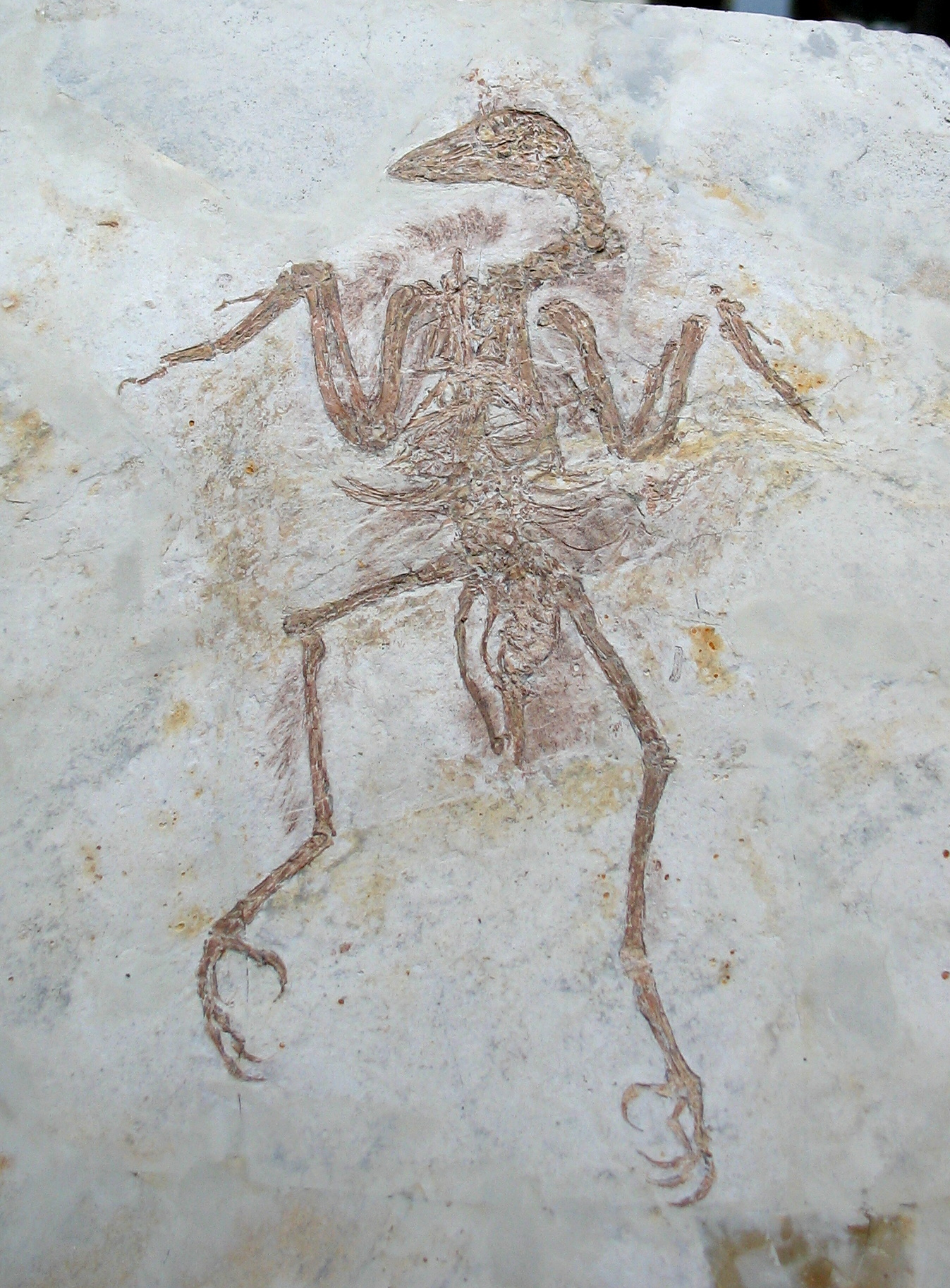
Another fossil of Liaoxiornis delicatus, at Museo Geominero de Madrid

== History ==
In 1999, Hou and Chen of the Nanjing Institute of Paleontology and Geology briefly described a specimen of very small bird obtained by the museum and named it Liaoxiornis delicatus. One month later, another specimen, obtained by the National Geological Museum of China (Beijing), was named by Li and Li as Lingyuanornis parvus. Soon afterwards, it was found that both museums had obtained different slabs of exactly the same specimen; because Liaoxiornis delicatus was named slightly earlier, that name takes precedence.

The type specimen is complete and articulated, and while it has mature flight feathers, features such as bones tipped in cartilage, small breastbone, large head and eye and unfused skeleton indicate that it was a juvenile. Zhou and Hou (2001) assigned it to the group Enantiornithes, and described it as being equally as advanced as Cathayornis. Several other specimens of juvenile enantiornitheans have been found in the same strata, but because all of them are juveniles, it is impossible to discern whether or not they represent the same species, and later authors have suggested that the taxon should be ignored as invalid for this reason.
