= Paraprotopteryx =

Paraprotopteryx Temporal range: Early Cretaceous, 122 Ma

Scientific classification
- Kingdom: Animalia
- Phylum: Chordata
- Class: Reptilia
- Clade: Dinosauria
- Clade: Saurischia
- Clade: Theropoda
- Clade: Avialae
- Clade: †Enantiornithes
- Genus: †Paraprotopteryx; Zheng, Zhang & Hou, 2007
- Species: †P. gracilis

Binomial name
- †Paraprotopteryx gracilis Zheng, Zhang & Hou, 2007

Extinct genus of birds

Paraprotopteryx is a genus of enantiornithean birds from the Mesozoic of China.

In 2007, the type species Paraprotopteryx gracilis was named and described by Zheng Xiaoting, Zhang Zihui and Hou Lianhai. The generic name means "near Protopteryx", in reference to a presumed similarity with that genus. The specific name is intended to mean "pretty".

The holotype is specimen STM V001. It consists of a skeleton with skull on a plate and counterplate. The investigation preceding the description of the species proved that fossil traders had added the skull of a different individual to the torso. The description is based on the rump parts. Feathers have been preserved. The rump represents a subadult individual.

Though initially reported to be from the Early Cretaceous Yixian Formation, later investigation showed that the fossil actually came from the Qiaotou Member of the Huajiying Formation of Fengning, Hebei Province, China, and is therefore of uncertain age. While much of the Huajiying Formation underlies the Yixian Formation, Ji and colleagues suggested in 2008 that the Qiaotou Member correlates with the Dawangzhangzi beds of the Yixian Formation, dated to approximately 122 million years ago by Zhou Zhonghe in 2006.

== Distinguishing characteristics ==
The original description suggested a number of distinguishing traits. Paraprotopteryx would have had a furcula (wishbone) which is shaped like a Y with a narrow angle between the clavicles. It also was described as having an unusually shaped breastbone, distinguishing it from other birds in the Enantiornithines. The carpometacarpus is only partially fused.

Paraprotopteryx has four, ten centimetres long, rectrices (flight feathers on the tail), more than doubling the total body length, which may represent an important step in feather evolution. They have a very elongated ribbon-like shaft and only the tips are barbed and expanded. In Paraprotopteryx they may have served as a secondary sex characteristic. This was the first time a tail fan was reported for Enantiornithes. Later such a double pair was reported for Shanweiniao. However, although the presence of two ribbon-like rectrices is certain (as in the related enantiornithean bird Protopteryx) the describers of Shanweiniao in 2012 voiced a suspicion that the second pair of rectrices in Paraprotopteryx might be the result of artifice.
