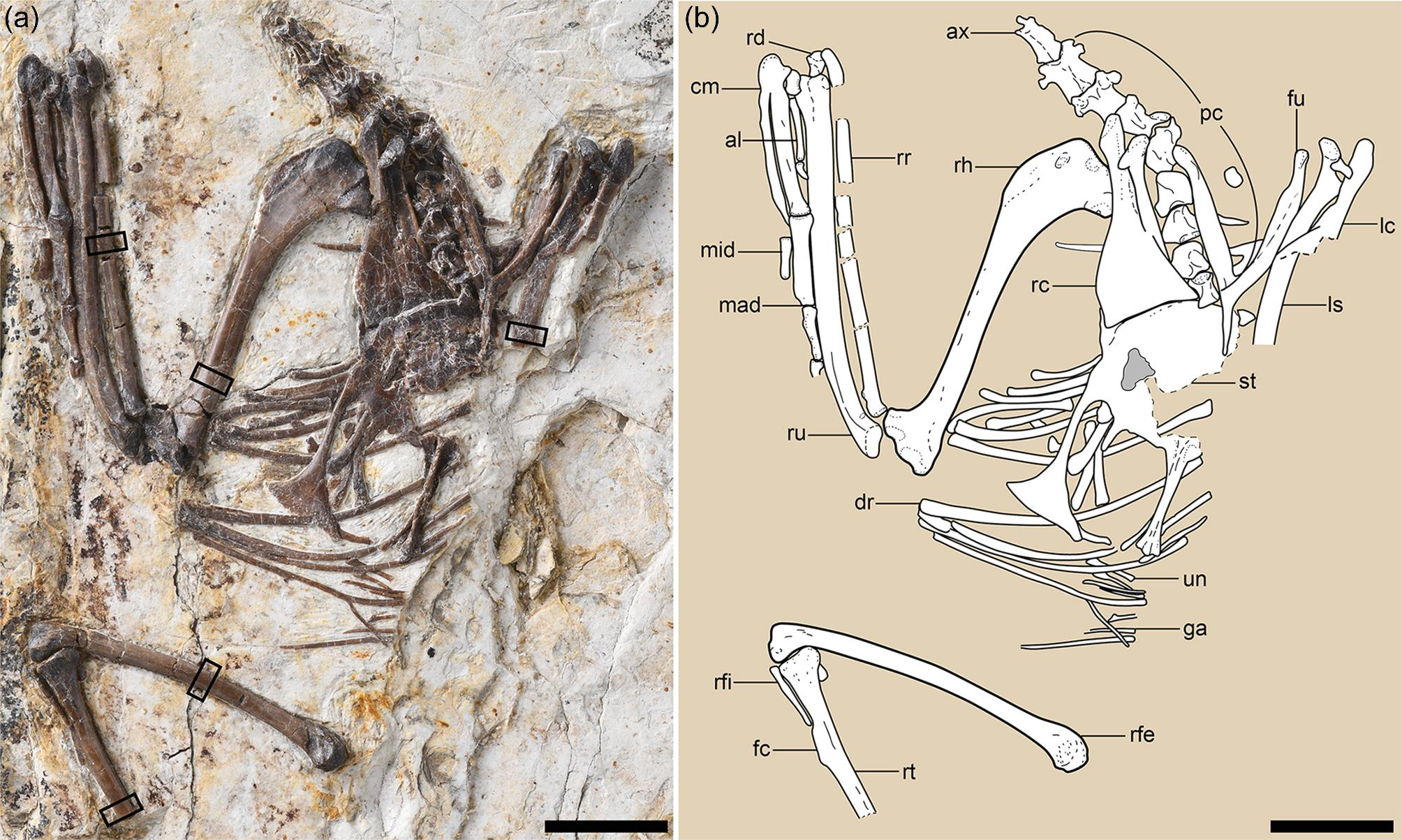
- Photograph and interpretive drawing of holotype specimen

Scientific classification
- Kingdom: Animalia
- Phylum: Chordata
- Clade: Dinosauria
- Clade: Saurischia
- Clade: Theropoda
- Clade: Avialae
- Clade: †Enantiornithes
- Genus: †Mirusavis; Wang et al., 2020
- Species: †M. parvus

Binomial name
- †Mirusavis parvus Wang et al., 2020

= Mirusavis =

Mirusavis Temporal range: Early Cretaceous

Extinct genus of birds

Mirusavis is a genus of Enantiornithes from the early Cretaceous (Aptian – Barremian) of China recovered in the Yixian Formation. It contains a single species, Mirusavis parvus.

== Etymology ==
The genus name Mirusavis comes from the Latin words mirus (unexpected) and words avis (bird), in reference to the unusual discovery of the holotype preserved during the laying cycle. The species name words parvus means "small" in Latin.

== Classification ==
Wang et al. (2020) recovered Mirusavis to be closest related to Shangyang graciles.

== Paleobiology ==
The type and only specimen of Mirusavis was a partial subadult skeleton identified by the lack of ossification that would be seen in a mature individual. Medullary bone tissue was also recovered in the specimen, meaning that the fossil was a female that died during the egg-laying cycle. This find shows that Enantiornithes were unlike modern day birds in that they became reproductively active before completing the ossification of their skeleton.
