= Shangyang graciles =

Shangyang Temporal range: Early Cretaceous, ~125–120 Ma

Scientific classification
- Kingdom: Animalia
- Phylum: Chordata
- Class: Reptilia
- Clade: Dinosauria
- Clade: Saurischia
- Clade: Theropoda
- Clade: Avialae
- Clade: †Enantiornithes
- Genus: †Shangyang; Wang & Zhou, 2019

Type species
- †Shangyang graciles Wang & Zhou, 2019

Extinct species of birds

Shangyang (after the mythical Chinese rainbird) is an extinct genus of enantiornithean birds that lived in the Early Cretaceous Jiufotang Formation of what is now the Liaoning Province of China. The type and only species is Shangyang graciles; the specific epithet is derived from the Latin word "gracilis", in reference to the slenderness of its limbs.

In 2025, Li and colleagues briefly described IVPP V26899, a nearly complete specimen with extensive preserved integument, referrable to the genus Shangyang based on characters of the premaxillae, tibiotarsus, and sternum. However, they refrained from assigning it to S. graciles due to differences in the sternum and furcula. The researchers studied melanosomes preserved in a feather of the specimen's head crest. They interpreted the melanosomes as indicative of red to deep blue iridescent coloration in that region.

== See also ==
- Dinosaur coloration
