= Otogornis =

Otogornis Temporal range: Barremian

Scientific classification
- Kingdom: Animalia
- Phylum: Chordata
- Class: Reptilia
- Clade: Dinosauria
- Clade: Saurischia
- Clade: Theropoda
- Clade: Avialae
- Clade: †Enantiornithes
- Genus: †Otogornis
- Species: †O. genghisi

Binomial name
- †Otogornis genghisi Hou, 1994

Extinct genus of avialan dinosaurs

Otogornis is an extinct genus of enantiornithean that lived during the Barremian stage of the Early Cretaceous epoch.

== Distribution ==
Otogornis genghisi is known from the Jingchuan Formation of Inner Mongolia.
