= Alula =

Small projections on the wings of birds

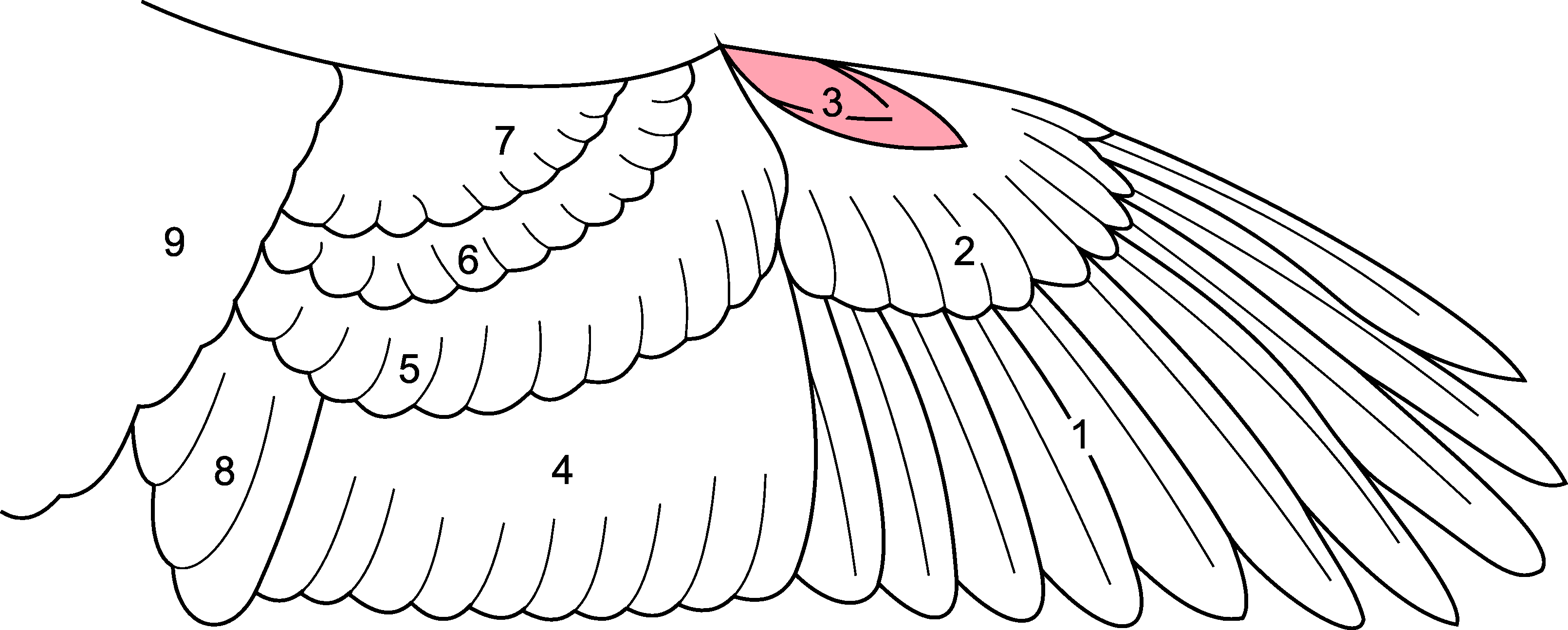
Location of the alula on a bird's wing

The alula /ˈæljʊlə/, or bastard wing, (plural alulae) is a small projection on the anterior edge of the wing of modern birds and a few non-avian dinosaurs. The word is Latin and means "winglet"; it is the diminutive of ala, meaning "wing". The alula is the freely moving first digit, a bird's "thumb", and typically bears three to five small flight feathers, with the exact number depending on the species. There also are minor covert feathers overlying the flight feathers. Like the larger flight feathers found on the wing's trailing edge, these alula feathers are asymmetrical, with the shaft running closer to anterior edge.

== Function ==
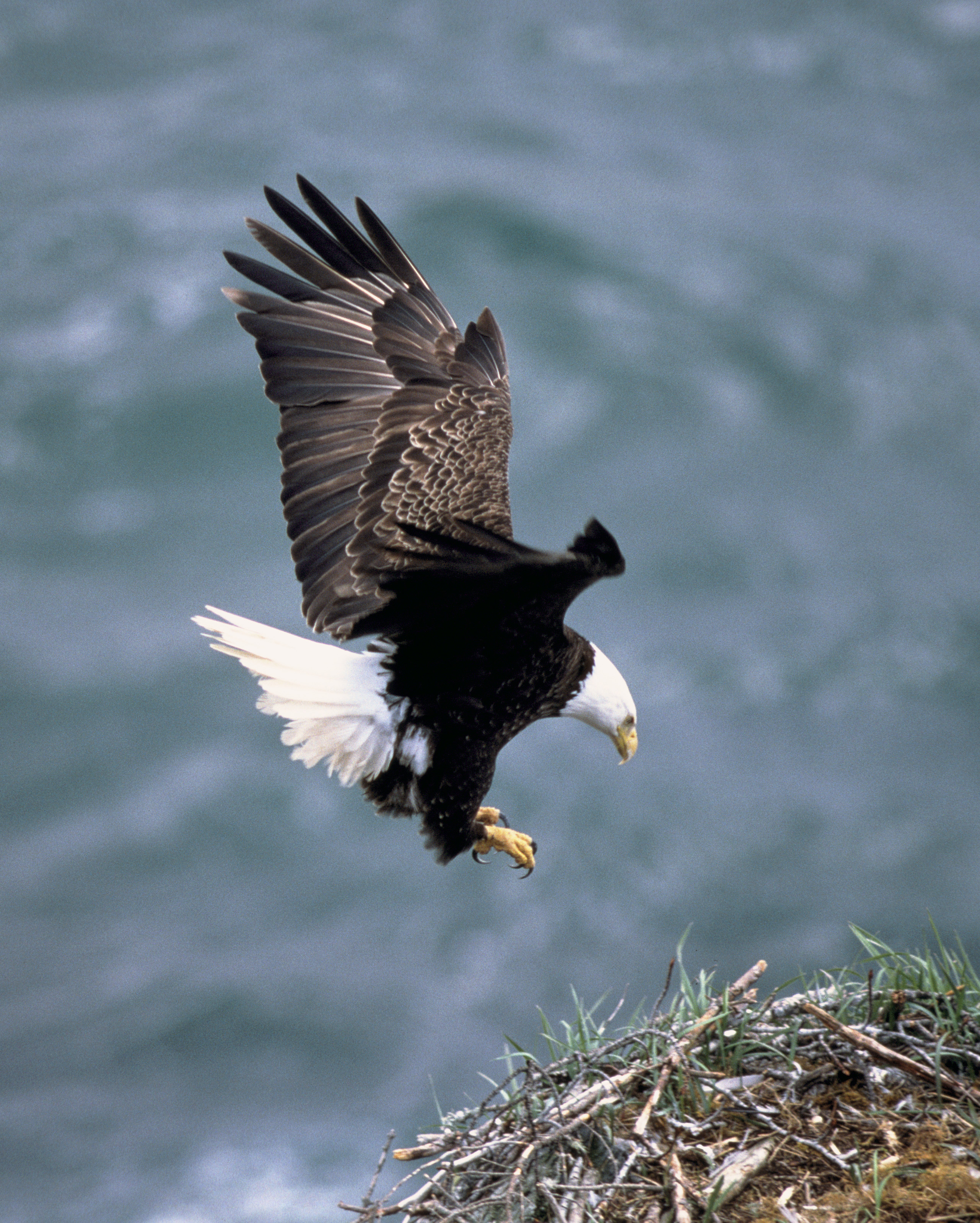
Adult bald eagle landing, showing the alula in action

In most situations, the alula is held flush against the wing; however, it can be manipulated. When flying at slow speeds or landing, the bird moves its alula slightly upwards and forward, which creates a small slot on the wing's leading edge. This functions in the same way as the slats on the leading edge of the wing of an aircraft, allowing the wing to achieve a higher than normal angle of attack – and thus lift – without resulting in a stall. The tip of the alula forms a tiny vortex, acting similar to a vortex generator, that forces the airflow over the wing to better bind to it. During stretching of the wing down toward the ground, the alula is abducted from the wing and can be clearly viewed.

In falcons, the alula is more prominent, and provides a degree of control when the wing is cupped or tucked in a dive/stoop. The alulae are particularly notable in peregrine falcons.

== In ancient birds ==
The presence of an alula has been confirmed in several now-extinct ancient relatives of modern birds, including Eoalulavis hoyasi (an enantiornithine from the mid-Cretaceous, 115 mya) and the earlier Protopteryx fengningensis. Since these species are not closely related to modern birds, either the alula evolved twice, or it did so more than 130 million years ago.

== See also ==
- Alular digit homology
- Bird flight
- Leading edge slot, the man-made equivalent on fixed-wing aircraft
