= List of dinosaur specimens with preserved soft tissue =

There have been some discoveries of unusually well-preserved fossil dinosaur specimens which bear remnants of tissues and bodily structures. Organic tissue was previously thought to decay too quickly to enter the fossil record, unlike more mineralised bones and teeth, however, research now suggests the potential for the long-term preservation of original soft tissues over geological time, leading to the formulation of various hypotheses regarding the underlying mechanisms involved.

== Ornithischians ==
=== Basal ornithischians ===
Nickname	Catalogue number(s)	Institution(s)	Taxon	Age	Unit	Country(s)	Notes	Images
	INREC K3/109	Institute of Natural Resources, Ecology, and Cryology	Kulindadromeus zabaikalicus	Bathonian	Ukureyskaya Formation	Russia	A basal ornithischian that preserves protofeathers.	

=== Ornithopods ===
Nickname	Catalogue number(s)	Institution(s)	Taxon	Age	Unit	Country(s)	Notes	Images
	AMNH 5240	American Museum of Natural History	Corythosaurus casuarius	Campanian	Dinosaur Park Formation	Alberta, Canada		
Ed Jr.	UCRC PV30	University of Chicago	Edmontosaurus annectens	Maastrichtian	Lance Formation	Wyoming, United States		
Ed Sr.	UCRC PV31	University of Chicago	Edmontosaurus annectens	Maastrichtian	Lance Formation	Wyoming, United States		
Trachodon mummy	AMNH 5060	American Museum of Natural History	Edmontosaurus annectens	Maastrichtian	Lance Formation	Wyoming, United States		The "Trachodon mummy"
Duck Bill / Edmund / Senckenberg mummy	SMF R 4036	Naturmuseum Senckenberg	Edmontosaurus annectens	Maastrichtian	Lance Formation	Wyoming, United States		
Medusa								
Dakota	MRF-03	Marmarth Research Foundation	Edmontosaurus annectens	Maastrichtian	Hell Creek Formation	Montana, United States	On display at North Dakota Heritage Center & State Museum	Impression of "Dakota"'s skin
			Edmontosaurus regalis					
			Gasparinisaura cincosaltensis					
			Gryposaurus notabilis					
	MOR 548	Museum of the Rockies	Hypacrosaurus stebingeri					
			Lambeosaurus lambei					
			Lambeosaurus magnicristatus					
			Maiasaura peeblesorum					
Big Paul	LACM 17715	Natural History Museum of Los Angeles County	Magnapaulia laticaudus	Campanian	El Gallo Formation	Mexico		Impression of Big Paul's skin displayed at LACM
			Parasaurolophus walkeri					
	AMNH 5220, AMNH 5221, and AMNH 5271	American Museum of Natural History	Saurolophus osborni	Maastrichtian	Horseshoe Canyon Formation	Canada		
	Various	Dinosaurium, among others	Saurolophus angustirostris	Maastrichtian	Nemegt Formation	Mongolia, and China	Many specimens are known from the locale called the Dragon's Tomb, which often perseveres soft tissues. This makes it a target for fossil poachers	
Leonardo		The Children's Museum of Indianapolis (on ten-year loan from Great Plains Dinosaur Museum and Field Station, 2013-2023)	Brachylophosaurus canadensis	Campanian	Judith River Formation	United States	Well-preserved mummified specimen	Leonardo the Brachylophosaurus
Wilo		North Carolina Museum of Natural Sciences	Thescelosaurus neglectus	Maastrichtian	Hell Creek Formation	South Dakota, United States	A controversial specimen supposedly with a fossilized four-chambered heart. This is probably a concretion	
			Thescelosaurus sp.	Maastrichtian	Hell Creek Formation, Tanis Site		Currently unpublished hind limb with extensive skin preservation present with scales	
	NHMUK R2501	Natural History Museum, London	Iguanodontia indent.	Valanginian	Wealden Group	England	Endocast with preserved fossilized brain tissue. Possibly belongs to Barilium dawsoni or Hypselospinus fittoni	

=== Ceratopsians ===
Nickname	Catalogue number(s)	Institution(s)	Taxon	Age	Unit	Country(s)	Notes	Images
Monoclonius cutleri	AMNH FARB 5427	American Museum of Natural History	Centrosaurus apertus					Cenotrosaurus apertus skin impressions
	TMP 1986.018.0097	Royal Tyrrell Museum of Palaeontology	Centrosaurus sp.					
	UALVP 52613, and CMN 2245	Canadian Museum of Nature	Chasmosaurus belli					
	SMF R 4970	Naturmuseum Senckenberg	Psittacosaurus sp.	Aptian	Yixian Formation	China	This specimen displays pigment preservation, bristles as well as a pigmented cloaca.	Psittacosaurus sp. mummy
	YFM-R001	Yanshi Fossil Museum	Psittacosaurus sp.	Aptian	Yixian Formation	China		
	GMC LL2001-01		Psittacosauridae indent.	Aptian	Yixian Formation	China		Psittacosaurid skin impressions
	AMNH 6418	American Museum of Natural History	Protoceratops andrewsi	Campanian	Djodochta Formation, Bayn Dzak Locality	Mongolia		
	UMNH VP 1600	Utah Museum of Natural History	Nasutoceratops titusi	Campanian	Kaiparowits Formation	Utah, United States		
Lane	HMNS PV.1506, formerly BHI-6273	Houston Museum of Natural Science	Triceratops horridus	Maastrichtian	Lance Formation	Wyoming, United States	Preserves extensive skin impressions, including large "nipple" scales on the sacrum and dorsum.	Triceratops horridus skin impressions
	CMNFV 56508	Canadian Museum of Nature	Triceratops prorsus	Maastrichtian	Frenchman Formation	Canada	Preserved skull with impressions of skin on the frill.	
			Triceratops sp.	Maastrichtian	Hell Creek Formation, Tanis Site	North Dakota, United States	Currently unpublished nearly-complete specimen with skin impressions, possibly killed in the K-Pg extinction event.	

=== Thyreophorans ===
Nickname	Catalogue number(s)	Institution(s)	Taxon	Age	Unit	Country(s)	Notes	Images
Suncor Nodosaur	TMP 2011.033. 0001	Royal Tyrrell Museum of Palaeontology	Borealopelta markmitchelli	Albian	Clearwater Formation	Canada	a nodosaurid which displays pigment preservation, indicating a reddish-brown upper coloration and lighter underside, as well as keratinous sheaths and stomach contents.	Borealopelta markmitchelli holotype specimen on display
	ML 1347	Lourinhã Museum	Deltapodus brodricki	Kimmeridgian	Lourinhã Formation	Portugal	Stegosaurian trackways containing skin impressions.	
	ZDM 0019	Zigong Dinosaur Museum	Gigantspinosaurus sichuanensis	Oxfordian	Shaximiao Formation	China	A stegosaurian with skin impressions present on the left shoulder on the hindlimb	Gigantspinosaurus sichuanensis skin impression
Victoria	SMA 0018	Aathal Dinosaur Museum	Hesperosaurus mjosi	Kimmeridgian	Morrison Formation, Howe Quarry	Wyoming, United States	A stegosaurid with skin impressions and remnants of sheaths over the plates	Hesperosaurus mjosi skin impression
	QM F1801	Queensland Museum	Kunbarrasaurus ieversi	Albian	Allaru Mudstone Formation	Australia	A basal parankylosaurian with skin impressions and gut contents containing fruits and seeds	Kunbarrasaurus ieversi holotype specimen
	IVPP V12560	Institute of Vertebrate Palaeontology & Paleoanthropology	Liaoningosaurus paradoxus	Aptian	Yixian Formation	China	A juvenile ankylosaurid with a large plate on the animal's underside interpreted as a plastron-like bony structure, but is more likely preserved skin.	
	HPM-1206	Dalian Xinghai Paleontological Museum	Liaoningosaurus paradoxus	Aptian	Yixian Formation	China	Another presumably juvenile specimen found in association with Lycoptera davidi fish fossils, which represent gut contents or were rather deposited below the fossil.	
	NHMUK PV R5161	Natural History Museum, London	Scolosaurus cutleri	Campanian	Dinosaur Park Formation	Canada	An ankylosaurid with extensive skin preservation.	Scolosaurus cutleri holotype specimen
	ZPAL MgD I/113	Polish Academy of Sciences	Tarchia kielanae	Maastrichtian	Barun Goyot Formation	Mongolia	An ankylosaurid with preserved keratinous scales on the skull.	
Zuul (originally Sherman)	ROM-75860	Royal Ontario Museum	Zuul crurivastator	Campanian	Judith River Formation	Montana, United States	An ankylosaurid with preserved skin impressions and keratin.	

== Theropods ==
=== Basal theropods ===
Nickname	Catalogue number(s)	Institution(s)	Taxon	Age	Unit	Country(s)	Notes	Images
	AMNH FR 7224	American Museum of Natural History	Coelophysis bauri	Norian	Ghost Ranch Locality	New Mexico, United States	Stomach contents with the bones of what was once believed to belong to a juvenile Coelophysis individual, showing evidence of cannibalism. However, more recent reviews suggest these to be the bones of the small crocodylomorph Hesperosuchus agilis	Coelophysis bauri with crocodylomorph remains in their stomach cavity
	AMNH FR 7223	American Museum of Natural History	Coelophysis bauri	Norian	Ghost Ranch Locality	New Mexico, United States	Another possible example of cannibalism with a supposed juvenile leg bone in an adult Coelophysis stomach. However, further examination reveals that the juvenile was actually deposited below another individual and was not in the stomach cavity at all	
	SGDS 15-T1	St. George Dinosaur Discovery Site	Eubrontes giganteus	Hettangian	Moenave Formation	Utah, United States	Foot tracks from a medium sized Dilophosaurus-like theropod with skin impressions	
Hitchcock Specimen	AC 1/7	Amherst Collage Museum of Natural History	Fulicopus lyellii	Sinemurian	Portland Formation	Massachusetts, United States	An impression of a sitting Dilophosaurus-like theropod that potentially shows impressions of feathers, or may also be a buildup of water in the mud	Ichnofossil specimen AC 1/7
	SGDS 642	St. George Dinosaur Discovery Site	Grallator isp.	Norian-Rhaetian	Fleming Fjord Formation	Greenland	Medium sized coelophysoid theropod trackways featuring scale impressions	
	SGDS 1165	St. George Dinosaur Discovery Site	Grallator isp.	Hettangian	Moenave Formation	Utah, United States	Short ridges likely representing folds of skin found in at least one trackway	
			Grallator variabilis	Hettangian	Grand-Causses Formation	France	Trackways bearing sales impressions	
			Magnoavipes isp.	Cenomanian	Dakota Formation	Colorado, United States	Trackways bearing small scale impressions from an averostran of some sort	
	CUE JJ_M01-3	Jinju Pterosaur Footprint Museum	Minisauripus chuanzhuensis	Albian	Haman Formation	South Korea	Tiny, probably juvenile, theropod track marks with skin impressions	
			Averostra indent.	Turonian	Kaskapau Formation	Canada	Small scale impressions found in trackways	

=== Avialans ===
Nickname	Catalogue number(s)	Institution(s)	Taxon	Age	Unit	Country(s)	Notes	Images
Beijing Specimen	BMNHC PH828	Beijing Museum of Natural History	Anchiornis huxleyi	Oxfordian	Tiaojishan Formation	China	An anchiornithid; smaller specimen with preserved feathers covering the legs and arm with fossilized melanosomes indicating a dark grey and black coloration. May not belong to Anchiornis	Anchiornis huxleyi Beijing specimen
	BMNHC PH804	Beijing Museum of Natural History	Anchiornis huxleyi	Oxfordian	Tiaojishan Formation	China	Nearly complete and articulated specimen with preserved feathers on the tail, forelimb, and hindlimb	
	IVPP V14378	Institute of Vertebrate Paleontology and Paleoanthropology	Anchiornis huxleyi	Oxfordian	Tiaojishan Formation	China	Holotype specimen with faint preservation of feathers on the back	
	LPM-B00169	Liaoning Paleontological Museum	Anchiornis huxleyi	Oxfordian	Tiaojishan Formation	China	Nearly complete and articulated specimen with extensive feather preservationon the wings, legs and feet. Along with long head feathers with preserved pigments which indicate a red color	Anchiornis huxleyi Liaoning Specimen
	YTGP-T5199	Yizhou Fossil & Geology Park	Anchiornis huxleyi	Oxfordian	Tiaojishan Formation	China	Nearly complete specimen with preserved feathers on the legs, tail, and some around the body. There are also preserved melanosomes indicating the presence of eumelanin, implying a dark coloration	Referred Anchiornis huxleyi YTGP-T5199 and accompanying diagram
	PKUP V1068	Peking University	Anchiornis huxleyi	Oxfordian	Tiaojishan Formation	China	Nearly complete specimen with some feather impressions around the tail	
	STM-0-38, 224, 227, 228	Shandong Tianyu Museum of Nature	Anchiornis huxleyi	Oxfordian	Tiaojishan Formation	China	Preserved plumage and gastric pellets	
	STM-0-214	Shandong Tianyu Museum of Nature	Anchiornis huxleyi	Oxfordian	Tiaojishan Formation	China	Nearly complete specimen with preserved scant feathers around the wing and legs	
	STM-0-179	Shandong Tianyu Museum of Nature	Anchiornis huxleyi	Oxfordian	Tiaojishan Formation	China	Exceptionally preserved specimen with fossilized plumage and gastric pallet in the oesophageal region containing lizard bones	Anchiornis huxleyi specimen STM-0-179
	STM-0-4, 7, 114, 118, 125, 127, 132, 133, 144, 147	Shandong Tianyu Museum of Nature	Anchiornis huxleyi	Oxfordian	Tiaojishan Formation	China	Multiple specimens with preserved feathers on the arms, legs, and around the body. As well as skin impressions showing scales on the feet, ankles, fingers and claws	Anchiornis huxleyi skeletal diagram by Scott Hartman showing multiple feather impressions from multiple specimens
	YFGP T5198	Yizhou Fossil & Geology Park	Aurornis xui	Oxfordian	Tiaojishan Formation	China	An anchiornithid bird with traces of preserved feathers on the tail, chest, and neck. Possibly synonymous with Anchiornis huxleyi	
Urfeder	BSP 1869 VIII and 1MB.Av.100 (counterslab) (See Specimens of Archaeopteryx)	Natural History Museum, Berlin	Archaeopteryx lithographica	Tithonian	Solnhofen Limestone	Germany	A single isolated fossil feather with preserved melanosomes indicating a probable black coloration for at least the wings. Has in the past been considered to belong to another avialan, but recent studies reaffirm Archaeopteryx affinties	Archaeopteryx lithographica feather imprint, formerly assigned as the holotype
London Specimen	NHMUK 37001(see Specimens of Archaeopteryx)	Natural History Museum, London	Archaeopteryx lithographica	Tithonian	Solnhofen Limestone	Germany	Body missing the head with preserved feathers on the tail and wings	Archaeopteryx lithographica London Specimen
Maxberg Specimen	S5 (see Specimens of Archaeopteryx)	Maxberg Museum	Archaeopteryx lithographica	Tithonian	Solnhofen Limestone	Germany	A now lost specimen with light feather impressions on the wings and legs	Archaeopteryx lithographica Maxberg Specimen
Munich Specimen	BSP 1999 I 50 (see Specimens of Archaeopteryx)	Munich Paleontological Museum	Archaeopteryx lithographica	Tithonian	Solnhofen Limestone	Germany	Nearly complete specimen with preserved feathers on the tail and wings	"Archaeopteryx bavarica" Munich Specimen
Bürgermeister-Müller Specimen (Chicken Wing)	Counterslab	Bürgermeister-Müller Museum (on an unlimited loan)	cf. Archaeopteryx lithographica	Tithonian	Solnhofen Limestone	Germany	Slight feather impressions on the counterslab around the second finger	Archaeopteryx lithographica Chicken Wing
Altmühl Specimen		Naturmuseum Senckenberg	Archaeopteryx lithographica	Tithonian	Solnhofen Limestone	Germany	Nearly complete specimen with preserved feathers on the body and legs	Archaeopteryx lithographica Altmühl Specimen
Chicago Specimen	PA 830 (see Specimens of Archaeopteryx)	Field Museum	Archaeopteryx lithographica	Tithonian	Solnhofen Limestone	Germany	Nearly complete specimen with preserved feathers on the wings and tail	Archaeopteryx lithographica Chicago Specimen
Berlin Specimen	MB.Av.101 (see Specimens of Archaeopteryx)	Natural History Museum, Berlin	Archaeopteryx siemensii	Tithonian	Solnhofen Limestone	Germany	Exceptionally preserved specimen with detailed feather preservation around the wings, tail, legs, and body	Archaeopteryx siemensii famous Berlin Specimen
Thermopolis Specimen	WDC CSG 100 (see Specimens of Archaeopteryx)	Wyoming Dinosaur Center	Archaeopteryx siemensii	Tithonian	Solnhofen Limestone	Germany	Well preserved specimen with faintly preserved feathers on the right wing and tail	Archaeopteryx siemensii Thermopolis Specimen
	IVPP V14287	Institute of Vertebrate Paleontology and Paleoanthropology	Archaeorhynchus spathula	Aptian	Yixian Formation	China	A nearly complete articulated subadult euornithine bird with preserved plumage around the body and three dozen gastroliths in the stomach	
	IVPP V17075/91	Institute of Vertebrate Paleontology and Paleoanthropology	Archaeorhynchus spathula	Aptian	Jiufotang Formation	China	Two specimens with preserved plumage around the body and gastroliths within the stomach	Archaeorhynchus spathula specimen IVPP V17091
	STM7-11	Shandong Tianyu Museum of Nature	Archaeorhynchus spathula	Aptian	Jiufotang Formation	China	Exceptionally preserved specimen with preserved feathers, approximately 100 gastroliths within the stomach region, and impressions of probable lung tissue	
	LNTU-WLMP-18	Western Liaoning Museum of Paleontology	Archaeorhynchus spathula	Aptian	Jiufotang Formation	China	A juvenile specimen with preserved feathers on the wings and gastric contents containing propagules, fruits, seeds, and ovules, although no gastroliths	Archaeorhynchus spathula specimen LNTU-WLMP-18
	STM7-145/163	Shandong Tianyu Museum of Nature	Archaeornithura meemannae	Aptian	Huajiying Formation	China	A hongshanornithid bird with extensively preserved feathers on the wings and body	Archaeornithura meemannae holotype specimen and counterslab
	IVPP V25371	Institute of Vertebrate Paleontology and Paleoanthropology	Avimaia schweitzerae	Aptian	Xiagou Formation	China	Lower body of an enantiornithine with some small patches of feathers preserved near the tail	Avimaia schweitzerae holotype with an unlaid egg
	IVPP V17970	Institute of Vertebrate Paleontology and Paleoanthropology	Bellulornis rectusunguis	Aptian	Jiufotang Formation	China	An ornithuromorph bird with faintly preserved feathers on the right wing and tail, as well as gastroliths within the stomach	
	LPM B00167	Liaoning Paleontological Museum	Bohaiornis guoi	Aptian	Jiufotang Formation	China	A bohaiornithid enantiornithine with preserved two ribbon-like tail feathers	
	IVPP V 17963	Institute of Vertebrate Paleontology and Paleoanthropology	Bohaiornis guoi	Aptian	Jiufotang Formation	China	Large stones, interpreted as gastroliths in the stomach cavity. But are more likely rocks deposited on top of the specimen and are not in the stomach at all	
	IVPP V26197	Institute of Vertebrate Paleontology and Paleoanthropology	Brevidentavis zhangi	Aptian	Xiagou Formation	China	An ornithuromorph bird with a possible gastric pellet preserved alongside the vertebrae	
	IVPP V13266	Institute of Vertebrate Paleontology and Paleoanthropology	Brevirostruavis macrohyoideus	Aptian	Jiufotang Formation	China	An enantiornithine bird with faintly preserved feathers around the wings, body, and tail	
	PMoL-B00175	Paleontological Museum of Liaoning	Caihong juji	Oxfordian	Tiaojishan Formation	China	A probable anchiornithid paravian with preserved plumage around the body that possesses pigments that might indicate black and iridescent "rainbow" colors, similar to that of a common grackle	Caihong juji holotype and counterslab specimens
	AMNH 30560/78	American Museum of Natural History	Calciavis grandei	Ypresian	Green River Formation	Wyoming, United States	A lithornithid bird with two specimens each with preserved wing feathers, skin impressions of pes scales, and plumage around the body which preserves pigments indicating a glossy, iridescent black, like that of a crow	
	IMG 5191	Beijing Museum of Natural History	Cathayornis aberransis	Aptian	Jiufotang Formation	China	Preserved plumage, wing feathers, and bifurcated tail	
	FMNH PA730	Field Museum of Natural History	Celericolius acriala	Ypresian	Green River Formation	Wyoming, United States	An Eocene mousebird with preserved tail feathers	
	GMV-2129	Geological Museum of China	Changchengornis hengdaoziensis	Aptian	Yixian Formation	China	A confuciusornithid bird with extensively preserved feathers around the body, wings, and a bifurcated tail	Changchengornis hengdaoziensis holotype and counterslab specimens
	AGB5840	Anhui Paleontological Museum	Changzuiornis ahgmi	Aptian	Jiufotang Formation	China	A gansuid ornithuromorph with feather impressions on the tail and wings, with preserved melanosomes indicating a black coloration, and gastroliths within the stomach	Changzuiornis ahgmi holotype specimen
	STM29-11	Shandong Tianyu Museum of Nature	Chiappeavis magnapremaxillo	Aptian	Jiufotang Formation	China	A pengornithid enantiornithine with preserved wing and tail feathers	
	STM9-9	Shandong Tianyu Museum of Nature	Chongmingia zhengi	Aptian	Jiufotang Formation	China	A jinguofortisid basal bird with preserved plumage around the body and gastroliths in the stomach	Chongmingia zhengi holotype specimen
	MCCM-LH-1184	Science Museum of Castilla-La Mancha	Concornis lacustris	Barremian	La Huérguina Formation	Spain	An enantiornithine bird with slight feather impressions on the wings and tail	Concornis lacustris holotype cast
	IVPP V11553	Institute of Vertebrate Paleontology and Paleoanthropology	Confuciusornis dui	Aptian	Yixian Formation	China	A now lost female specimen with preserved plumage around the body and keratin on the beak	
	DNHM D2454	Dalian Natural Museum	Confuciusornis feducciai	Aptian	Jiufotang Formation	China	A well preserved specimen with preserved plumage and bifurcated tail feathers. Probably a synonym of C. sanctus	
	IVPP V13168, V13156	Institute of Vertebrate Paleontology and Paleoanthropology	Confuciusornis sanctus	Aptian	Yixian Formation	China	Nearly complete specimens with preserved plumage, wing feathers, and bifurcated tail feathers. Furthermore, skin impressions on the feet	Confuciusornis sanctus specimen IVPP V13156
	IVPP V10920-10925	Institute of Vertebrate Paleontology and Paleoanthropology	cf. Confuciusornis sanctus	Aptian	Yixian Formation	China	Specimen with scant and slight feather impressions	
	IVPP V13313	Institute of Vertebrate Paleontology and Paleoanthropology	Confuciusornis sanctus	Aptian	Jiufotang Formation	China	A well preserved specimen with slight feather impressions and scales of Jinanichthys sp. in the throat	
	IVPP V13171	Institute of Vertebrate Paleontology and Paleoanthropology	Confuciusornis sanctus	Aptian	Jiufotang Formation	China	Nearly complete specimen with preserved skin impressions and feathers with preserved melanosomes, indicating colors of grey, black, brown, and red, similar to a modern zebra finch	
	IVPP V12352	Institute of Vertebrate Paleontology and Paleoanthropology	Confuciusornis sanctus	Aptian	Yixian Formation	China	Nearly complete specimen with preserved keratin on the tip of the beak	
	IVPP V110304	Institute of Vertebrate Paleontology and Paleoanthropology	Confuciusornis sanctus	Aptian	Yixian Formation	China	Well preserved specimen with preserved wing feathers	
	GMV-2130, 2131, 2132, 2133, 2141, 2142, 2146, 2147, 2154	Geological Museum of China	Confuciusornis sanctus	Aptian	Yixian Formation	China	Well preserved plumage around the bodies	
	BMNHC PH766	Beijing Museum of Natural History	Confuciusornis sanctus	Aptian	Yixian Formation	China	Well preserved specimen with plumage and skin impressions of scales on the feet	
	BMNHC PH925, 931, 986, and 987	Beijing Museum of Natural History	Confuciusornis sanctus	Aptian	Yixian Formation	China	Well preserved plumage around the bodies and bifurcated tail feathers	
	DNHM D2859	Dalian Natural Museum	Confuciusornis sanctus	Aptian	Yixian Formation	China	Well preserved specimen with fossilized plumage around the body	
	DNHM D1874	Dalian Natural Museum	Confuciusornis sanctus	Aptian	Yixian Formation	China	A probable female specimen with preserved plumage	
	DNHM D2508/2151	Dalian Natural Museum	Confuciusornis sanctus	Aptian	Yixian Formation	China	Well preserved specimens with indents of plumage and bifurcated tail feathers	
	LPM 0228/9	Liaoning Paleontological Museum	Confuciusornis sanctus	Aptian	Yixian Formation	China	Well preserved specimens with indents of plumage and bifurcated tail feathers	
	LPM 0233	Liaoning Paleontological Museum	Confuciusornis sanctus	Aptian	Yixian Formation	China	Well preserved specimen with fossilized plumage around the body	
	MCFO 0589	CosmoCaixa Barcelona	Confuciusornis sanctus	Aptian	Yixian Formation	China	Well preserved specimen with fossilized plumage around the body	
	NIGPAS-139379	Nanjing Institute of Geology and Palaeontology	Confuciusornis sanctus	Aptian	Yixian Formation	China	Two specimens with preserved plumage around the bodies, one with bifurcated tail feathers and the other without, probably representing a male and female	
	HGM 41HIII0400/1	Henan Geological Museum	Confuciusornis sanctus	Aptian	Yixian Formation	China	Well preserved specimen with plumage around the body and bifurcated tail feathers	
	MGSF315		Confuciusornis sanctus	Aptian	Yixian Formation	China	A well preserved specimen with wing feathers with preserved pigments possibly indicating a lighter white coloration for the wings	
	CUGB P1401	China University of Geosciences	Confuciusornis sp.	Aptian	Yixian Formation	China	Preserved feathers with fossilized melanosomes indicating a darker black coloration	Confuciusornis specimen GUGB P1401
	STM13-133/162	Shandong Tianyu Museum of Nature	Confuciusornis sp.	Aptian	Yixian Formation	China	Well preserved specimens with feather impressions and a keratinous rhampotheca	
	UFrJ-Dg 031	Federal University of Rio de Janeiro	Cratoavis cearensis	Aptian	Crato Formation	Brazil	A small enantiornithine bird with preserved body feathers and bifurcated tail feathers. Furthermore, two specimens of Dastilbe sp. near the digestive track	
	IVPP V31106	Institute of Vertebrate Paleontology and Paleoanthropology	Cratonavis zhui	Aptian	Jiufotang Formation	China	A jinguofortisd basal bird with preserved plumage around the body	
	IVPP 21711	Institute of Vertebrate Paleontology and Paleoanthropology	Cruralispennia multidonta	Hauterivian	Huajiying Formation	China	A small enantiornithine bird with preserve plumage present with fossilized melanosomes, indicating a dark brown or black iridescent coloration	Cruralispennia multidonta holotype specimen
	LPM 00039	Liaoning Paleontological Museum	Dapingfangornis sentisorhinus	Aptian	Jiufotang Formation	China	Nearly complete specimen of an enantiornithine with preserved plumage and long bifurcated tail feathers	
	USNM 10908	National Museum of Natural History	Diatryma? filifera	Ypresian	Green River Formation	Wyoming, United States	Fossilized impressions of what were believed to be feathers belonging to the flightless galloanserae Diatryma, but were in fact Sedge material belonging to the unique species Cyperacites filiferus	Cyperacites filiferus holotype specimen
	IVPP V20284	Institute of Vertebrate Paleontology and Paleoanthropology	Dingavis longimaxilla	Aptian	Yixian Formation	China	An ornithuromorph bird with preserved gastroliths within the stomach	
		Museum of Natural Sciences, Brussels	Dynamopterus tuberculata	Lutetian	Messel Formation	Germany	A fossil cuckoo bird with preserved tail feathers and gastroliths in the stomach	
	HPG-15-2	Hupoge Amber Museum	Elektorornis chenguangi	Cenomanian	Hukawng Valley	Myanmar	Hindlimb of a small enantiornithine bird found in Burmese amber with preserved plumage and skin	
	LH13500	Science Museum of Castilla-La Mancha	Eoalulavis hoyasi	Barremian	La Huérguina Formation	Spain	An enantiornithine bird with faintly preserved wing feathers	
	IVPP V11977	Institute of Vertebrate Paleontology and Paleoanthropology	Eoconfuciusornis zhengi	Hauterivian	Dabeigou Formation	China	An early confuciusornithid bird with preserved plumage around the body and bifurcated tail feathers	
	STM7-144	Shandong Tianyu Museum of Nature	Eoconfuciusornis zhengi	Hauterivian	Dabeigou Formation	China	Preserved skin impressions of scales on the feet, possibly remnants of an ovarian follicle meaning the individual was female, and extensive plumage preservation with fossilized melanosomes indicating a black iridescent coloration	
	SMF-ME 1450	Senckenberg Research Institute	Eocoracias brachyptera	Lutetian	Messel Formation	Germany	A stem roller bird with preserved plumage with fossilized melanosomes indicating a non-iridencent blue and black coloration	Eocoracias brachyptera specimen SMF-ME 1450A
	WDC-CGR-109	Wyoming Dinosaur Center	Eocypselus rowei	Ypresian	Green River Formation	Wyoming, United States	An early apodiform with preserved feathers with fossilized melanosomes indicating a black possibly iridescent coloration	
			Eoenantiornis buhleri	Aptian	Yixian Formation	China		
			Eofringillirostrum boudreauxi					
			Eoglaucidium sp.	Lutetian	Messel Formation	Germany		
			Eogranivora edentulata					
			Eopengornis martini					
			Eosinopteryx brevipenna					
			Enantiophoenix electrophyla					
			Feitianius paradisi					
			Fortipesavis prehendens					
			Fortunguavis xiaotaizicus					
			Gansus zheni					
			Gastornis sp.					
			Gretcheniao sinensis					
			Hassiavis laticauda					
	DNHM D2946		Hongshanornis longicresta					
			Holbotia ponomarenkoi					
			Houornis caudatus					
			Ilerdopteryx viai					
			Imparavis attenboroughi					
	MUSM 1444		Inkayacu paracasensis	Divisaderan-Tinguirirican	Otuma Formation	Peru	A fossil penguin; pigments are preserved on this specimen.	
			Iteravis huchzermeyri					
			Jeholornis prima					
			Jianchangornis microdonta					
			Jianianhualong tengi					
	IVPP V24194	Institute of Vertebrate Paleontology and Paleoanthropology	Jinguofortis perplexus	Barremian	Dabeigou Formation	China	A pygostylian bird with feather preservation.	Image: 200 pixels
			Juehuaornis zhangi					
			Junornis houi					
			Kaririavis mater					
			Longicrusavis houi					
	BMNHC PH826		Longipteryx chaoyangensis					
			Liaoxiornis delicatus					
			Linyiornis amoena					
			Longirostravis hani					
			Longusunguis kurochkini					
			Masillatrogon pumilio					
			Mengciusornis dentatus					
			Messelornis nearctica					
			Messelornis sp.					
			Messelirrisor halcyrostris					
			Morsoravis sedilis					
			Musivavis amabilis					
	FMHH PA 778	Field Museum of Natural History	Nahmavis grandei	Eocene	Green River Formation	United States	A bird from the Eocene lagerstätte of the Green River in Wyoming	Image: 200 pixels
			Neobohaiornis lamadongensis					
			Noguerornis gonzalezi					
			Ningyuansaurus wangi					
			Oligocolius psittacocephalon					
			Ostromia crassipes					
			Orienantius ritteri					
	MLP 14-I-10-22		Palaeeudyptes gunnari					
			Paleoglaux artophoron					
			Parahesperornis alexi					
			Parapengornis eurycaudatus					
			Paraprefica kelleri					
			Paraprotopteryx gracilis					
			Parargornis messelensis					
			Parvavis chuxiongensis					
			Pellornis mikkelseni					
			Pedopenna daohugouensis					
			Piscivorenantiornis insusitatus					
			Piscivoravis lii					
			Pumiliornis tessellatus					
			Praeornis sharovi					
			Primobucco mcgrewi					
			Cf. Primotrogon sp.					
			Primozygodactylus eunjooae					
	IVPP V11665		Protopteryx fengningensis					
			Salmila robusta					
	HGM 41HIII0405		Sapeornis chaoyangensis					
	DNHM D3078		Sapeornis chaoyangensis					
			Scaniacypselus szarskii					
			Schizooura lii					
			Septencoracias morsensis					
Siky			Serikornis sungei					
			Shanweiniao cooperorum					
			Shenqiornis mengi					
			Shuilingornis angelai					
			Similiyanornis brevipectus					
			Tianyuornis cheni					
			Tynskya eocaena					
			Wellnhoferia grandis					
			Xiaotingia zhengi					
			Xingtianosaurus ganqi					
	STM 9-531		Yanornis martini					
			Yixianornis grabaui					
			Yuanchuavis kompsosoura					
			Yuanjiawaornis viriosus					
			Zhongornis haoae					
	CUGB P1202		Bohaiornithidae indent.					
	HPG-15-1		Enantiornithe indent.				A complete juvenile specimen stuck in Burmese amber	
	GSGM-07-CM-001		Enantiornithe indent.					
	YLSNHM00813	Yingliang Stone Natural History Museum	Enantiornithe indent.				Both wings and hndlimbs with wing feathers of an anantiornithine bird preserved in Burmese amber	
	CUGB G20120001		Enantiornithe indent.					
	CUGB P1201		Enantiornithe indent.					
	BMNHC PH1154/56		Enantiornithe indent.					
			Neoaves indent.		Fur Formation			
	CUGB G20100053		Ornithurine indent.					

=== Non-avialan maniraptoriformes ===
Nickname	Catalogue number(s)	Institution(s)	Taxon	Age	Unit	Country(s)	Notes	Images
	IVPP V24192	Institute of Vertebrate Paleontology and Paleoanthropology	Ambopteryx longibrachium	Oxfordian	Haifanggou Formation	China	A scansoriopterygid with preserved bat-like skin membrane and feathers	
	IVPP V11559	Institute of Vertebrate Paleontology and Paleoanthropology	Beipiaosaurus inexpectus	Aptian	Yixian Formation	China	a small basal therizinosauroid; a disarticulated specimen of a subadult with preserved plumage around the tail. As well as what has been interpreted as blood cells but are more likely diagenic structures composed of kaolinite clay	Beipiaosaurus inexpectus feather impressions
	STM 31-1	Shandong Tianyu Museum of Nature	Beipiaosaurus inexpectus	Aptian	Yixian Formation	China	Specimen composed of a head, neck, and upper half of the torso with preserved protofeathers around the neck. As well as phosphatized skin flakes revealing corneocytes	
	BMNHC PH000911	Beijing Museum of Natural History	Beipiaosaurus inexpectus	Aptian	Yixian Formation	China	Upper body with preserved protofeathers around the neck with fossilized melanosomes, indicating a dark brown coloration	
	IVPP V12344	Institute of Vertebrate Paleontology and Paleoanthropology	Caudipteryx dongi	Aptian	Yixian Formation	China	A caudipterid oviraptorosaur; a nearly complete specimen missing a head with preserved wing feathers and possible skin impressions	
	NGMC 97-4-A/9-A	Geological Museum of China	Caudipteryx zoui	Aptian	Yixian Formation	China	Holotype and paratype specimen with preserved feathers on the tails and arms, as well as gastroliths within the stomach	Caudipteryx zoui holotype specimen
	BPM 0001	Beipiao Paleontological Museum	Caudipteryx zoui	Aptian	Yixian Formation	China	Nearly complete specimen with preserved plumage and wing feathers	
	IVPP V12430	Institute of Vertebrate Paleontology and Paleoanthropology	Caudipteryx cf. zoui	Aptian	Yixian Formation	China	Nearly complete specimen with preserved plumage around the body and wing fethers	Caudipteryx sp. specimen IVPP V 12430
	STM4-3	Shandong Tianyu Museum of Nature	Caudipteryx sp.	Aptian	Yixian Formation	China	Nearly complete specimen missing the head with preserved feathers on the arms and around the tail. Molecule remnants are also present. As well as gastroliths within the stomach	Caudipteryx dongi holotype specimen
	HC B016	Natural History Museum of Los Angeles	Changyuraptor yangi	Aptian	Yixian Formation	China	A microraptorine dromaeosaurid; a nearly complete specimen with preserved feathers and plumage around the body, arms, legs, and tail	
	LDNHMF 2026A & B (Counterslab)	Lande Museum of Natural History	Changzhousaurus sinensis	Aptian	Jiufotang Formation	China	A small basal paravian with preserved plumage around the entire body, including the head, tail, and wings	
	UALVP 59400	University of Alberta	Chirostenotes pergracilis	Campanian	Dinosaur Park Formation	Alberta, Canada	A caenagnathid oviraptorosaur with possible feather impressions on the second digit	
Big Mama	MPC-D 100/979	Mongolian Paleontological Center	Citipati osmolskae	Campanian	Nemegt Formation	Mongolia	An oviraptorid with faint traces of an α-keratin sheath over the manual unguals	
	IMMNH PV00731	Inner Mongolia Museum of Natural History	Daurlong wangi	Aptian	Longjiang Formation	China	Nearly complete basal Dromaeosaurid with preserved plumage on the back and neck, intestinal tracks similar to Scipionyx, and a frog specimen, probably representing Mesophryne near the feet	Daurlong wangi holotype specimen
	MPC-D100/127	Mongolian Paleontological Center	Deinocheirus mirificus	Maastrichtian	Nemegt Formation	Mongolia	A large ornithomimosaur with over 1,400 gastroliths and fish remains, including bones and scales	
	MPC-D 100/85	Mongolian Paleontological Center	Duonychus tsogtbaatari	Cenomanian	Bayan Shireh Formation	Mongolia	A therizinosaurid with a trace of a keratinous sheath on the manual ungual	
	IVPP V15471	Institute of Vertebrate Paleontology and Paleoanthropology	Epidexipteryx hui	Callovian	Haifanggou Formation	China	A scansoriopterygid with preserved plumage and four long ribbon-like tail feathers	Epidexipteryx hui holotype specimen
	STM4-1 and 22-6	Shandong Tianyu Museum of Nature	Incisivosaurus sp.	Aptian	Yixian Formation	China	A basal oviraptorosaur; two juvenile specimens formerally assigned to Similicaudipteryx yixianensis with preserved feathers on the tail, hands, and arms. Furthermore, one specimen possibly shows signs of moulting	
	41HIII-0308	Henan Geological Museum	Jianchangosaurus yixianensis	Aptian	Yixian Formation	China	A basal therizinosaurian; a nearly complete juvenile specimen with slight feather impressions around the body	Feather impressions Jianchangosaurus yixianensis
	CAGS-IG-04-0801	Chinese Academy of Geological Sciences	Jinfengopteryx elegans	Aptian	Huajiying Formation	China	A troodontid with extensive feather preservation present with a feathered tail fan	Jinfengopteryx elegans holotype specimen
			Magnoavipes isp.	Cenomanian	Naturita Formation	Colorado, United States	Possibly ornithomimosaurian ichnogenus; scale scratch marks from the heel region	
	IVPP V13352	Institute of Vertebrate Paleontology and Paleoanthropology	Microraptor gui	Aptian	Jiufotang Formation	China	Nearly complete specimen with faint feather impressions on the arms, legs, and tip of the tail	Microraptor gui holotype specimen
	IVPP V17972	Institute of Vertebrate Paleontology and Paleoanthropology	Microraptor gui	Aptian	Jiufotang Formation	China	Nearly complete specimen with faintly preserved plumage around the body and stomach contents containing the bones of an enantiornithine bird	
	IVPP V13320, 51, 477 and TNP00996	Institute of Vertebrate Paleontology and Paleoanthropology and Tianjin Museum of Natural History	Microraptor gui	Aptian	Jiufotang Formation	China	Well preserved specimens with feather impressions	
	BMNHC PH881	Beijing Museum of Natural History	Microraptor gui	Aptian	Jiufotang Formation	China	Nearly complete specimen with feather impressions with preserved melanosomes, indicating a black iridescent coloration, similar to that of a crow	
	BMNHC Ph763	Beijing Museum of Natural History	Microraptor gui	Aptian	Jiufotang Formation	China	Currently unpublished specimen with preserved feather impressions	Microraptor gui specimen BMNHC Ph763
	QM V1002	Beijing Museum of Natural History	Microraptor gui	Aptian	Jiufotang Formation	China	Well preserved specimen with feather impressions around the body and tail and stomach contents containing the remains of fish vertebra	
	LVH 0026	Department of Land and Resources of Liaoning Province	Microraptor hanqingi	Aptian	Jiufotang Formation	China	Well preserved specimen with faint feather impressions on the leg	
	IVPP V12330	Institute of Vertebrate Paleontology and Paleoanthropology	Microraptor zhaoianus	Aptian	Jiufotang Formation	China	Well preserved specimen with faint feather impressions	
	STM5-32	Shandong Tianyu Museum of Nature	Microraptor zhaoianus	Aptian	Jiufotang Formation	China	Nearly complete specimen with stomach contents containing the remains of the lizard Indrasaurus wangi	
	LPM 0200/ 0201 and LPM 0159	Liaoning Palaeontology Museum	Microraptor zhaoianus	Aptian	Jiufotang Formation	China	Two fairly complete specimens, originally assigned as Cryptovolans pauli, with faint feather impressions on the legs and arms. The first known dromaeosaurid with such feathers reported	
	STM5-109	Shandong Tianyu Museum of Nature	Microraptor sp.	Aptian	Jiufotang Formation	China	Exceptionally complete specimen with wing feathers, propatagium skin, and scale impressions on the pes and soft feet pads	Foot of Microraptor specimen STM 5-109
	STM5-93/172	Shandong Tianyu Museum of Nature	Microraptor sp.	Aptian	Jiufotang Formation	China	Exceptionally preserved specimens with wing feathers, propatagium skin	
	STM5-4, 5, 9, 75, 142, 150, 221, 6-62, 86	Shandong Tianyu Museum of Nature	Microraptor sp.	Aptian	Jiufotang Formation	China	Multiple specimens with well preserved wing feather impressions on the arms and legs	
	130108-MHGU-F4281	Museum of Hebei	Norellraptor barsboldi	Aptian	Jiufotang Formation	China	A remarkably complete specimen of an immature microraptorine closely related to Microraptor itself with preserved plumage all around the body	
	TMP 2009.110.1, 2008.70.1, and 1995.110.1	Royal Tyrrell Museum of Palaeontology	Ornithomimus edmontonicus	Campanian	Dinosaur Park Formation	Alberta, Canada	Three specimens, one a juvenile, with slight feather impressions on the body and arms	
	UALVP 52531	University of Alberta Laboratory for Vertebrate Paleontology	Ornithomimus sp.	Campanian	Dinosaur Park Formation	Alberta, Canada	Smooth scaleless skin and feather impressions on the leg	
	LHC 7777	Science Museum of Castilla-La Mancha	Pelecanimimus polyodon	Barremian	La Huérguina Formation	Spain	A basal ornithomimosaur; smooth scaleless skin on the head, scale impression on the arm, possible occipital crest, and possible lizard-like dewlap or gular pouch similar to modern pelicans, although now prepared over and mostly lost	
	NGMC 2125	National Geological Museum of China	Protarchaeopteryx robusta	Aptian	Yixian Formation	China	Basal oviraptorosaur with faint feathers forming a fan on the tail	
	UALVP 55700	University of Alberta Laboratory for Vertebrate Paleontology	Saurornitholestes langstoni	Campanian	Dinosaur Park Formation	Alberta, Canada	Nearly complete dromaeosaurid specimen currently still under preparation with traces of a possible keratinous sheath over the sickle claw	
	CAGS-02-IG-gausa-1	Chinese Academy of Geological Sciences	Scansoriopteryx heilmanni	Oxfordian	Tiaojishan Formation	China	A juvenile scansoriopterygid, originally assigned to Epidendrosaurus ninchengensis, with preserved feather impressions on the arms and tail and skin impressions of scales on the feet	
	IGM 100/977	Mongolian Institute of Geology	Shuvuuia deserti	Campanian	Djadochta Formation	Mongolia	An alvarezsaurid with faint traces of feathers containing possible β-keratin, although they may be misidentified calcium phosphate	
	IVPP V12811	Institute of Vertebrate Paleontology and Paleoanthropology	Sinornithosaurus millenii	Aptian	Yixian Formation	China	A microraptorine dromaeosaurid with preserved plumage containing fossilized melanosomes indicating a black and rufous coloration	Sinornithosaurus millenii holotype specimen
Dave	NGMC 91	Geological Museum of China	Sinornithosaurus millenii	Aptian	Yixian Formation	China	Exceptionally preserved subadult specimen with plumage around the body	Sinornithosaurus millenii specimen NGMC 91 "Dave"
	MPC-D100/54	Mongolian Paleontological Center	Velociraptor mongoliensis	Campanian	Djadochta Formation	Mongolia	Stomach contents containing azhdarchid pterosaur remains	
	DNHM D2933	Dalian Natural Museum	Wulong bohaiensis	Aptian	Jiufotang Formation	China	A microraptorine dromaeosaurid with faintly preserved feather impressions around the body, legs, arms, and tail containing fossilized melanosomes indicating a glossy iridescence	Wulong bohaiensis holotype specimen
	STM31-2	Shandong Tianyu Museum of Nature	Yi qi	Oxfordian	Tiaojishan Formation	China	A scansoriopterygid with preserved plumage around the body and skin membrane on the arms forming bat-like wings	Yi qi holotype specimen
	IVPP V12638	Institute of Vertebrate Paleontology and Paleoanthropology	Yixianosaurus longimanus	Aptian	Yixian Formation	China	A problematic species of paravian, possibly anchiornithid, with preserved feathers impressions around the arms	
	JPM-0008	Jinzhou Paleontological Museum	Zhenyuanlong suni	Aptian	Yixian Formation	China	A probable microraptorine dromaeosaurid with preserved feathers on the tail, body, and arms	Zhenyuanlong suni holotype specimen
	DIP-V-15103	Dexu Institute of Paleontology	Coelurosauria indent.	Cenomanian	Hukawng Valley	Myanmar	A tail of a juvenile specimen stuck in amber with preserved protofeathers and possibly proteins	
	IVPP V13476	Institute of Vertebrate Paleontology and Paleoanthropology	Microraptoria indent.	Aptian	Jiufotang Formation	China	Preserved feathers on the tibiotarsus and the tarsometatarsus	
	NMV P160550	Melbourne Museum	Paraves indent.	Aptian	Koonwarra Fossil Bed	Australia	Preserved protofeathers	

=== "Compsognathids" ===
Nickname	Catalogue number(s)	Institution(s)	Taxon	Age	Unit	Country(s)	Notes	Images
Compsognathus. corallestris	MNHN CNJ79	National Museum of Natural History, France	Compsognathus longipes	Kimmeridgian	Canjuers Lagerstätte	France	Bumpy structures on the tail interpreted as scales but are more likely to be aberrant bone outgrowths	
	IVPP V 14202	Institute of Vertebrate Palaeontology & Paleoanthropology	Huadanosaurus sinensis	Aptian	Yixian Formation	China	Potential juvenile specimen with preserved protofeathers with preserved melanosomes indicating a chestnut or light brown coloration in life	Holotype specimen Huadanosaurus sinensis
	CAGS-IG-02-301	Chinese Academy of Geological Sciences	Huaxiagnathus orientalis	Aptian	Yixian Formation	China	Gut contents with partially digested unidentified vertebrate bones	Holotype specimen of Huaxiagnathus orientalis
Borsti	JME Sch 200	Eichstätt Jura Museum	Juravenator starki	Kimmeridgian	Solnhofen Limestone	Germany	Exceptionally preserved juvenile specimen with scaly skin impressions and feathery filaments on the underside of the tail and leg. Possibly a juvenile megalosaurid	Holotype specimen of Juravenator starki
	SMNK 2349 PAL	State Museum of Natural History Karlsruhe	Mirischia asymmetrica	Albian	Romualdo Formation	Brazil	Piece of petrified intestine interpreted as a post-cranial air sac similar to modern birds preserved in between and pubis and ischia	
	IVPP V12415	Institute of Vertebrate Palaeontology & Paleoanthropology	Sinosauropteryx lingyuanensis	Aptian	Yixian Formation	China	Preserved feathery plumage surrounding the tail	Holotype of Sinosauropteryx lingyuanensis with preserved plumage
	GMV 2123 and NIGP 127586 (Counter slab)	Geological Museum of China and Nanjing Institute of Geology and Palaeontology	Sinosauropteryx prima	Aptian	Yixian Formation	China	Exceptionally preserved specimen with fossilized protofeathers running along the back. The feathers even preserve melanosomes, indicating a reddish-brown upper side, lighter white underside, and striped tail	Holotype specimen of Sinosauropteryx prima
	NIGP 127587	Nanjing Institute of Geology and Palaeontology	Sinosauropteryx prima	Aptian	Yixian Formation	China	A larger specimen with preserved protofeathers running a long the back present with melanosomes. As well as stomach contents containing a specimen of the small shinisaurian lizard Dalinghosaurus sp.	Sinosauropteryx prima holotype specimen (left) compared to the referred specimen NIGP 127587 (right)
	NGMC/GMV 2124	Geological Museum of China	Cf. Sinosauropteryx sp.	Aptian	Yixian Formation	China	Preserved protofeathers and gut contents containing the jaw bones of two individuals of the symmetrodont Zhangheotherium quinquecuspidens and one of the multituberculate Sinobaatar lingyuanensis. Possibly a tyrannosauroid	Specimen GMV 2124 formerly assigned to Sinosauropteryx prima
	JMP-V-05-8-01	Jiangxi Provincial Museum	Sinocalliopteryx gigas	Aptian	Yixian Formation	China	Preserves extensive protofeathers on the body and tail. As well as gut contents of an undigested small dromaeosaurid Sinornithosaurus millenii hindlimb with feathers and gastroliths	Holotype specimen of Sinocalliopteryx gigas
	CAGS-IG-T1	Chinese Academy of Geological Sciences	Sinocalliopteryx gigas	Aptian	Yixian Formation	China	Gut contents containing two individuals of the confuciusornithid bird Confuciusornis sanctus and an unidentified ornithischian dinosaur	Abdominal contents of Sinocalliopteryx gigas specimen CAGS-IG-T1
	SMNK PAL 29241	Formally held in the State Museum of Natural History Karlsruhe in Germany but has since been repossessed by the Plácido Cidade Nuvens Paleontology Museum in Brazil	"Ubirajara jubatus"	Aptian	Crato Formation	Brazil	Preserved filaments on its shoulders. The name "Ubirajara" is a nomen nudum since the paper describing it was withdrawn following controversy around the specimen's legality	
Little Doggie/Ambrogio/Ciro	SBA-SA 163760	Superintendence for the Archaeological Heritage of Salerno	Scipionyx samniticus	Albian	Pietraroja Plattenkalk	Italy	A near-complete juvenile specimen that preserved exceptional phosphatized internal organs, including intestines, tracheal rings, traces of blood tissues, gut contents including lizard remains, a rectum containing fish scales, and even the impression of where the heart would be. Possibly a juvenile carcharodontosaurid	Holotype specimen of Scipionyx samnticus
	BMMS-BK-11	Bürgermeister-Müller-Museum	Sciurumimus albersdoerferi	Kimmeridgian	Solnhofen Limestone	Germany	Exceptionally preserved juvenile specimen with fossilized protofeather plumage around the tail and body, as well as skin impressions on the underside of the torso and tail. Possibly a juvenile megalosauroid	Holotype specimen of Sciurumimus albersdoeferi

=== Tyrannosauroids ===
Nickname	Catalogue number(s)	Institution(s)	Taxon	Age	Unit	Country(s)	Notes	Images
	TMP 1994.186.0001	Royal Tyrrell Museum of Palaeontology	Albertosaurus sarcophagus	Maastrichtian	Horseshoe Canyon Formation	Alberta, Canada	Skin impressions on the underside of the torso	
	TMP 99.186.01	Royal Tyrrell Museum of Palaeontology	Albertosaurus sarcophagus	Maastrichtian	Horseshoe Canyon Formation	Alberta, Canada	Skin impressions on the lower torso region	
	RTMP 94.186.1	Royal Tyrrell Museum of Palaeontology	Albertosaurus sarcophagus	Maastrichtian	Horseshoe Canyon Formation	Alberta, Canada	Skin impressions	
	TMP 2003.45.88	Royal Tyrrell Museum of Palaeontology	Cf. Albertosaurus sarcophagus	Maastrichtian		Alberta, Canada	Disarticulated possible skin impressions from the lower torso region. Possibly Lambeosaurus-like hadrosaurid	
	MOR 590	Museum of the Rockies	Daspletosaurus horneri	Campanian	Two Medicine Formation	Montana, United States	Ostelogical correlates for cornified pads and large crocodylian-like scales across the entire face. However, the distribution of foramina in the bone seems to indicate that the extra oral tissue doesn't actually resemble Crocodiles much at all	Daspletosaurus horneri holotype skull
	TMP 2001.036.0001	Royal Tyrrell Museum of Palaeontology	Daspletosaurus torosus	Campanian	Oldman Formation	Alberta, Canada	Skin impressions from an unidentified region of the body	
	OTM 200	Old Trail Museum	Daspletosaurus sp.	Campanian	Two Medicine Formation	Montana, United States	Stomach contents containing juvenile hadrosaurids	
	IVPP V14243	Institute of Vertebrate Palaeontology & Paleoanthropology	Dilong paradoxus	Aptian	Yixian Formation	China	A basal tyrannosauroid with preserved protofeather impressions near the tail and jaw	
	CMN 11593	Canadian Museum of Nature	Gorgosaurus libratus	Campanian	Dinosaur Park Formation	Alberta, Canada	Possible small skin impression on the underside of the mid-section of the tail	
	NMC 2120	Canadian Museum of History	Gorgosaurus libratus	Campanian	Dinosaur Park Formation	Alberta, Canada	Skin impressions supposedly showing smooth scaleless "naked" skin like that seen some modern flightless birds. Phil Bell and colleagues report that the impressions were covered in plaster and lost the 1980s	
	TMP 2009.12.14	Royal Tyrrell Museum of Palaeontology	Gorgosaurus libratus	Campanian	Dinosaur Park Formation	Alberta, Canada	Stomach contents of a juvenile specimen containing the hind limbs of two individuals of the caenagnathid theropod Citipes elegans	
Bloody Mary	BHI 6437	North Carolina Museum of Natural Sciences	Nanotyrannus lancensis	Maastrichtian	Hell Creek Formation	Montana, United States	Skin impressions on the metatarsal. This specimen may be a juvenile Tyrannosaurus but more likely belongs to a unique taxon Nanotyrannus lancensis	Skin impression of Nanotyrannus lancensis from the Dueling Dinosaurs specimen
	MN 4802-V	National Museum of Brazil	Santanaraptor placidus	Albian	Romualdo Formation	Brazil	A now potentially destroyed specimen of a basal tyrannosauroid with skin impressions on the hindlimb, present with large scutellate scales similar to some modern birds	
	MPD 107/6A	Central Museum of Dinosaurs of Mongolia	Tarbosaurus bataar	Maastrichtian	Nemegt Formation	Mongolia	Skin impressions on the thoracic region. Probably belongs to a hadrosaurid, possibly Saurolophus angustirostris	
	MPD 100F/12	Central Museum of Dinosaurs of Mongolia	Tarbosaurus bataar	Maastrichtian	Nemegt Formation	Mongolia	Skin impressions on the heel and pad of the foot	
Tarbosaurus mummy			Tarbosaurus bataar	Maastrichtian	Nemegt Formation	Mongolia	A now lost, probably destroyed, specimen with extensive skin preservation on the upper side of the tail and hips	
			Tarbosaurus bataar	Maastrichtian	Nemegt Formation	Mongolia	A now lost articulated skull with accompanying skin impressions complete with a "wattle or bag of skin under the jaws" similar to some modern lizards. Possibly the same specimen as the Tarbosaurus mummy	
Wyrex	HMNS 2006.1743.01	Houston Museum of Natural Science	Tyrannosaurus rex	Maastrichtian	Hell Creek Formation	Montana, United States	Skin impressions on the underside of the tail, torso, and neck	
B-rex	MOR 1125 (See Specimens of Tyrannosaurus)	Museum of the Rockies	Tyrannosaurus rex	Maastrichtian	Hell Creek Formation	Montana, United States	Supposedly preserved red blood cells and proteins within the femur. However this conclusion is controversial and others have supposed it to be permineralized biofilm	
	AMNH 5027 (See Specimens of Tyrannosaurus)	American Museum of Natural History	Tyrannosaurus rex	Maastrichtian	Hell Creek Formation	Montana, United States	Possible osteological correlates on the skull indicating cornified pads on the snout and lacrimal rugose ridges	Skull cast of Tyrannosaurus rex specimen AMNH 5027
	CM 9380 (See Specimens of Tyrannosaurus)	Carnegie Museum of Natural History	Tyrannosaurus rex	Maastrichtian	Hell Creek Formation	Montana, United States	Holotype specimen with osteological correlates on the snout indicating scales	
Rex Jr.	UCRC-PV1	University of Chicago	Tyrannosaurus rex	Maastrichtian	Lance Formation	Wyoming, United States	An unpublished supposedly scaleless 'mummy' from Paul Sereno which shows the outline of the lower part of the torso	
Dietrich Specimen			Tyrannosaurus rex	Maastrichtian		United States	Currently unpublished possible skin impressions on the neck. Probably not actual skin impressions, possibly a negative impression from a trionychid turtle	
			cf. Tyrannosaurus rex	Maastrichtian		United States	Unpublished skin impressions from an unknown part of the body. Possibly hadrosaurid?	
	ZCDM V5000	Zhucheng Dinosaur Museum and Erlianhaote Dinosaur Museum	Yutyrannus huali	Aptian	Yixian Formation	China	A basal proceratosaurid tyrannosauroid with preserved plumage surrounding the body	

=== Carnosaurs ===
Nickname	Catalogue Number(s)	Institution(s)	Taxon	Age	Unit	Country(s)	Notes	Images
Big Al II	SMA 0005	Aathal Dinosaur Museum	Allosaurus jimmadseni	Kimmerdigian	Morrison Formation, Howe Quarry	Wyoming, United States	Skin impressions on the proximal part of the tail. May belong to a diplodocid sauropod	
	WDC DMQ-A 053	Wyoming Dinosaur Center	Allosaurus jimmadseni	Kimmerdigian	Morrison Formation	Wyoming, United States	A juvenile specimen with skin impressions on the pectoral region of the ribs	
		The Children's Museum of Indianapolis	Allosaurus sp.	Kimmerdigian	Morrison Formation, Jurassic Mile Locality	Wyoming, United States	Currently unpublished extensive skin impressions	
	MNHUK-R-9951	Natural History Museum, London	Baryonyx walkeri	Berremian	Wealden Group	England	Stomach contents revealing the scales of Scheenstia mantelli and a juvenile iguanodontid	
	MCCM-LH 6666	Science Museum of Castilla-La Mancha	Concavenator corcovatus	Barremian	La Huérguina Formation	Spain	Skin impressions on the underside of the tail, plantar pads on the underside of the feet, and scutate scales on the legs like those seen in some modern birds	Holotype specimen of Concavenator corcovatus
	ML 565-155	Lourinhã Museum	Lourinhanosaurus antunesi	Kimmeridgian	Lourinhã Formation	Portugal	An embryonic skeleton with skin impressions present in the shoulder region	
	MIWG 6348	Museum of Isle of Wight Geology	Neovenater salerii	Barremian	Wealden Group	England	Osteological correlates on the snout for a complex sensory system	

=== Ceratosaurs ===
Nickname	Catalogue number(s)	Institution(s)	Taxon	Age	Unit	Country(s)	Notes	Images
	MCF-PVPF-236	Carmen Funes Municipal Museum	Aucasaurus garridoi	Campanian	Anacleto Formation	Argentina	Osteological correlates for attachment points of tail muscles present on the pelvis	
	MACN-CH 894	Museo Argentino de Ciencias Naturales	Carnotaurus sastrei	Maastrichtian	La Colonia Formation	Argentina	Skin impressions on the underside of the tail, fragments on the left side of the body and skull	Carnotaurus sastrei skin impressions
	FMNH PR 2100	Field Museum of Natural History	Majungasaurus crenatissimus	Maastrichtian	Maevarano Formation	Madagascar	Virtually complete skull with ostegical correlates for extra oral tissue	Majungasaurus crenatissimus FMNH PR 2100 skull cast
	MMCH-PV 48	Ernesto Bachmann Municipal Museum	Skorpiovenator bustingorryi	Cenomanian	Huincul Formation	Argentina	Possible osteological correlates for muscle attachment points on the pelvis, legs, and on the correlates for scales on the snout and a neurovascular system on the skull	
	MMCh‐PV 69	Ernesto Bachmann Municipal Museum	Abelisauridae indent.	Cenomanian	Candeleros Formation	Argentina	Osteological correlates for muscle attachment points on the pubis	

== Sauropodomorphs ==
=== Mamenchisaurids ===
Nickname	Catalogue number(s)	Institution(s)	Taxon	Age	Unit	Country(s)	Notes	Images
	ZDM 0083	Zigong Dinosaur Museum	Mamenchisaurus youngi	Bathonian	Shaximiao Formation	Sichuan, China	Remarkably complete holotype specimen for M. youngi containing skin impressions of scales on the distal end of the ischium	

=== Diplodocoids ===
Nickname	Catalogue number(s)	Institution(s)	Taxon	Age	Unit	Country(s)	Notes	Images
	MWC 5537	Museum of Western Colorado	cf. Apatosaurus sp.	Kimmeridgian	Morrison Formation, Mygatt-Moore Quarry	Colorado, United States	Skin impressions	(Figure c) Single scale of cf. Apatosaurus sp. (MWC 5537).
	DNM 2873	Dinosaur National Monument	Barosaurus lentus	Kimmeridgian	Morrison Formation, Carnegie Quarry	Utah, United States	Currently unpublished skin impressions	
Gordo	DFN 150B / CM 1198 / ROM 3670	Royal Ontario Museum	Barosaurus sp.	Kimmeridgian	Morrison Formation, Carnegie Quarry	Utah, United States	Skin impressions possibly from the front of the limb	
		Dinosaur National Monument	Cf. Barosaurus sp.	Kimmeridgian	Morrison Formation, Carnegie Quarry	Utah, United States	Three small patches of skin impressions from an unmarked locality, possibly lost and / uncatalogued	
	ML 414	Lourinhã Museum	Dinheirosaurus lourinhanensis	Tithonian	Lourinhã Formation	Portugal	Nearly a hundred stones interpreted as gastroliths in the stomach but are more likely pebbles deposited on top of the specimen	
Seismosaurus	NMMNH 3690	New Mexico Museum of Natural History	Diplodocus hallorum	Kimmeridgian	Morrison Formation	New Mexico, United States	250 stones interpreted as gastroliths in the stomach but are more likely pebbles deposited on top of the specimen	
	MDS-2019-028	Cincinnati Museum Center	Diplodocus sp.	Kimmeridgian	Morrison Formation, Mother's Day Quarry	Montana, United States	Fossilized skin found in-situ on a young, possibly juvenile individual present on the underbelly, around a limb, and possibly on the neck and head	Skin impressions from a juvenile Diplodocus sp.
	CMC VP 15915, 10659-60, 10662, 20857-58	Cincinnati Museum Center	Diplodocus sp.	Kimmeridgian	Morrison Formation, Mother's Day Quarry	Montana, United States	Possibly multiple young or immature specimens with preserved skin impressions from an unknown part of the part. At least one contains melanosomes, indicating a brownish or dark coloration	
			cf. Kaatedocus siberi	Kimmeridgian	Morrison Formation, Howe Quarry	Wyoming, United States	At least 14 dermal spines at the end of the tail with at least one patch of scaly skin preserved in association	
	AMNH FARB 7543	American Museum of Natural History	Diplodocoidea? indent.	Kimmeridgian	Morrison Formation, Howe Quarry	Wyoming, United States	Reportedly multiple patches of skin impressions, with most of it lost and destroyed during preparation work and only a small number actually surviving	

=== Macronarians ===
Nickname	Catalogue number(s)	Institution(s)	Taxon	Age	Unit	Country(s)	Notes	Images
	SMA 0002	Aathal Dinosaur Museum	Camarasaurus sp.	Kimmeridgian	Morrison Formation, Howe Quarry	Wyoming, United States	A camarasaurid with skin impressions on both hind limbs and left fore limb	
	DMNH 39045	Denver Museum of Natural History	Cedarosaurus weiskopfae	Valanginian	Cedar Mountain Formation, Yellow Cat Member	Utah, United States	A brachiosaurid with 115 stones of varying sizes interpreted as gastroliths preserved in the stomach cavity, but are more likely stones were deposited on top of the specimen	
Judy	AODF 0888	Australian Age of Dinosaurs	Diamantinasaurus matildae	Cenomanian	Winton Formation	Australia	A diamantinasaurwith preserved scaly skin impressions and stomach contents of conifers, seed ferns, leaves, and angiosperms	
	MPM-PV 1156	Padre Molina Museum	Dreadnoughtus schrani	Maastrichtian	Cerro Fortaleza Formation	Argentina	A titanosaur specimen with preserved fossilized collegian and internal proteins as well as possible osteological correlates for soft tissue on the neural spine	
	NHMUK R1868 & 1870	Natural History Museum, London	Haestasaurus becklesii	Tithonian	Wealden Group	England	A basal macronarian with skin impressions on the limb	Skin impressions from Haestasaurus becklesii
	MEF-PV 1125/1-6	Museum of Paleontology Egidio Feruglio	Tehuelchesaurus benitezii	Kimmeridgian	Cañadón Calcáreo Formation	Argentina	A camarasaurid with skin impressions	Skin impressions from Tehuelchesaurus benitezii
			Brontopodus cf., pentadactylus	Aalenian	Saltwick Formation	England	Manus and pes skin impressions	
	MQE.2023.038	Mongolia Quest Expedition	Brontopodus isp.	Maastrichtian	Nemegt Formation	Mongolia	Forelimb manus skin impressions	
			cf. Brontopodus isp.	Albian	Haman Formation	South Korea	Hindlimb skin impressions from footprints	
			Pashtosaurus zhobi	Maastrichtian	Vitakri Formation	Balochistan, Pakistan	An ichnotaxon of titanosaur, possibly giant hadrosaurid, which demonstrate plausible plantar skin impressions	
	PVPH-130		Cf. Megaloolithidae	Campanian	Anacleto Formation	Argentina	Disarticulated embryonic skeleton containing skin impressions probably from the backside of the animal	A) Large patch (PVH- 126). B) Detail of rosette structure of PVPH-130.
	MMCERCS-1340		Titanosauria indent.	Maastrichtian	Tremp Formation	Spain	Skin impression from a footprint	

== See also ==
- Dinosaur coloration
- Feathered dinosaur
- List of non-avian dinosaur species preserved with evidence of feathers
- Dinosaur mummy
- List of fossils with consumulites

== Sources ==
- Chiappe, Luis M.; Meng, Qingjin (2016). Birds of Stone: Chinese Avian Fossils from the Age of Dinosaurs. Baltimore: Johns Hopkins University Press. ISBN 978-0-297-84156-2.
- Sanders, F.; Manley, K.; Carpenter, K. (2001). "Gastroliths from the Lower Cretaceous sauropod Cedarosaurus weiskopfae". In Tanke, Darren; Carpenter, Ken (eds.). Mesozoic Vertebrate Life: New Research Inspired by the Paleontology of Philip J. Currie. Indiana University Press. pp. 166–180. ISBN 0-253-33907-3
