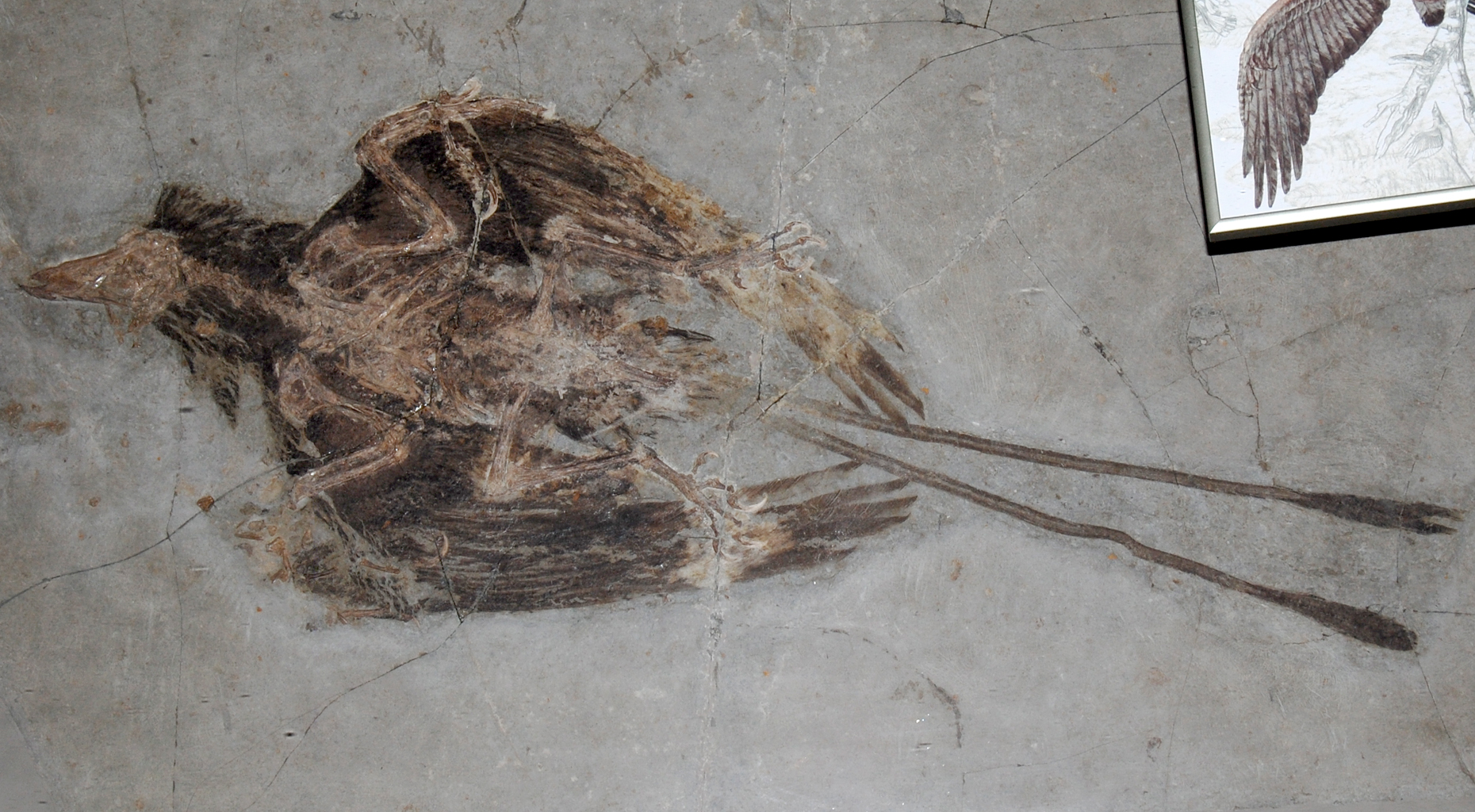
- Fossil pygostylian (Confuciusornis sanctus)
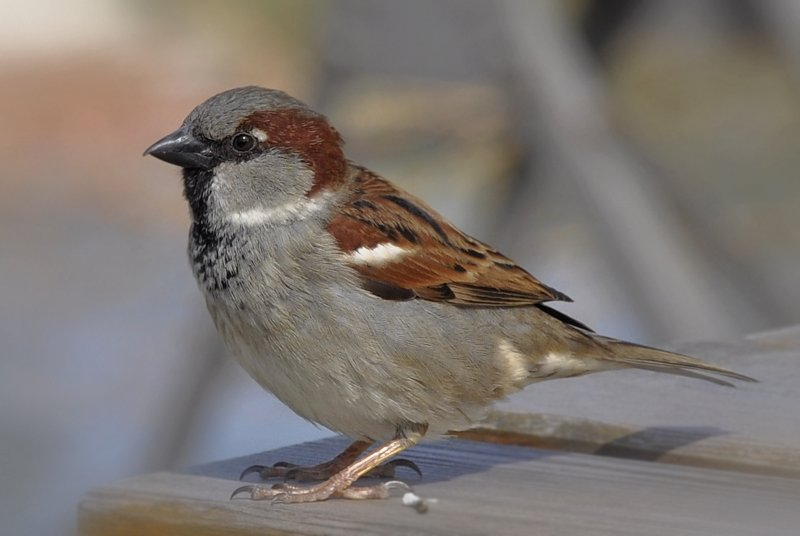
- House sparrow (Passer domesticus)

Scientific classification
- Kingdom: Animalia
- Phylum: Chordata
- Class: Reptilia
- Clade: Dinosauria
- Clade: Saurischia
- Clade: Theropoda
- Clade: Avialae
- Clade: Avebrevicauda; Paul, 2002
- Clade: Pygostylia; Paul, 2002

Subgroups
- †Confuciusornithidae; †Jinguofortisidae; †Omnivoropterygidae?; Ornithothoraces

= Pygostylia =

Pygostylians Temporal range: Early Cretaceous–Present, 136–0 Ma

Clade of extant dinosaurs

Pygostylia is a group of avialans which includes the Confuciusornithidae and all of the groups more closely related to modern birds.

== Definition ==
The group Pygostylia was intended to encompass all avialans with a short, stubby tail, as opposed to the longer, unfused tails of more primitive species like Archaeopteryx lithographica. It was named by Sankar Chatterjee in 1997. Luis Chiappe later defined Pygostylia as a node-based clade, "the common ancestor of the Confuciusornithidae and Neornithes plus all its descendants". In 2001, Jacques Gauthier and Kevin de Queiroz recommended that Chatterjee's original apomorphy-based clade concept be used instead of Chiappe's node-based definition, but this recommendation has been inconsistently followed. Luis Chiappe and co-authors continue to use Chiappe's definition, often attributing authorship of the name to Chiappe 2001 or Chiappe 2002 rather than to Chatterjee.

Cladogram following the results of a phylogenetic study by Jingmai O'Connor and colleagues in 2016:

- Pygostylia
  - †Confuciusornithiformes
  - - †Didactylornis
    - †Sapeornis
    - Ornithothoraces

In 2023, Li et al. recovered their new taxon, Cratonavis, as the new jinguofortisid that belongs to Pygostylia. The results of their phylogenetic analyses are shown in the cladogram below:

- Avialae
  - †Archaeopteryx
  - - †Jeholornis
    - Pygostylia
      - †Sapeornis
      - †Jinguofortisidae
        - Jinguofortis
        - - Cratonavis
          - Chongmingia
      - †Confuciusornithidae
      - - Ornithothoraces
          - Ornithuromorpha
          - † Enantiornithes

Pygostylia has been recovered as being within the clade Avebrevicauda. Avebrevicauda (meaning "birds with short tails") is a group of birds which includes all avialan species with ten or fewer free vertebrae in the tail. The group was named in 2002 by Gregory S. Paul to distinguish short-tailed avialans from their ancestors, such as Archaeopteryx, which had long, reptilian tails. Depending on the analysis, Sapeornis may or may not be a member of Pygostylia, but is always within Avebrevicauda. Depending on the true phylogenetic position of Sapeornis, Avebrevicauda may be a junior synonym of Pygostylia.

== Description ==
Chiappe noted that under his definition, all members of the Pygostylia share four unique characteristics. The trait that gives the group its name is the presence of a pygostyle, or set of fused vertebrae at the end of the tail. Next is the absence of a hyposphene - hypantrum. Next is a reversed pubic bone separated from the main axis of the sacrum by an angle of 45 to 65 degrees. Last is a bulbous medial condyle of the tibiotarsus (lower leg bone).

The pygostylians fall into two distinct groups with regard to the pygostyle. The Ornithothoraces have a ploughshare-shaped pygostyle, while the more primitive members had longer, rod-shaped pygostyles.

The earliest known member of the group is the enantiornithine species Protopteryx fengningensis, from the Sichakou Member of the Huajiying Formation of China, which dates to around 131 Ma ago, though at least one other enantiornithine, Noguerornis, may be even older, at up to 145.5 million years ago, though its exact age is uncertain.
