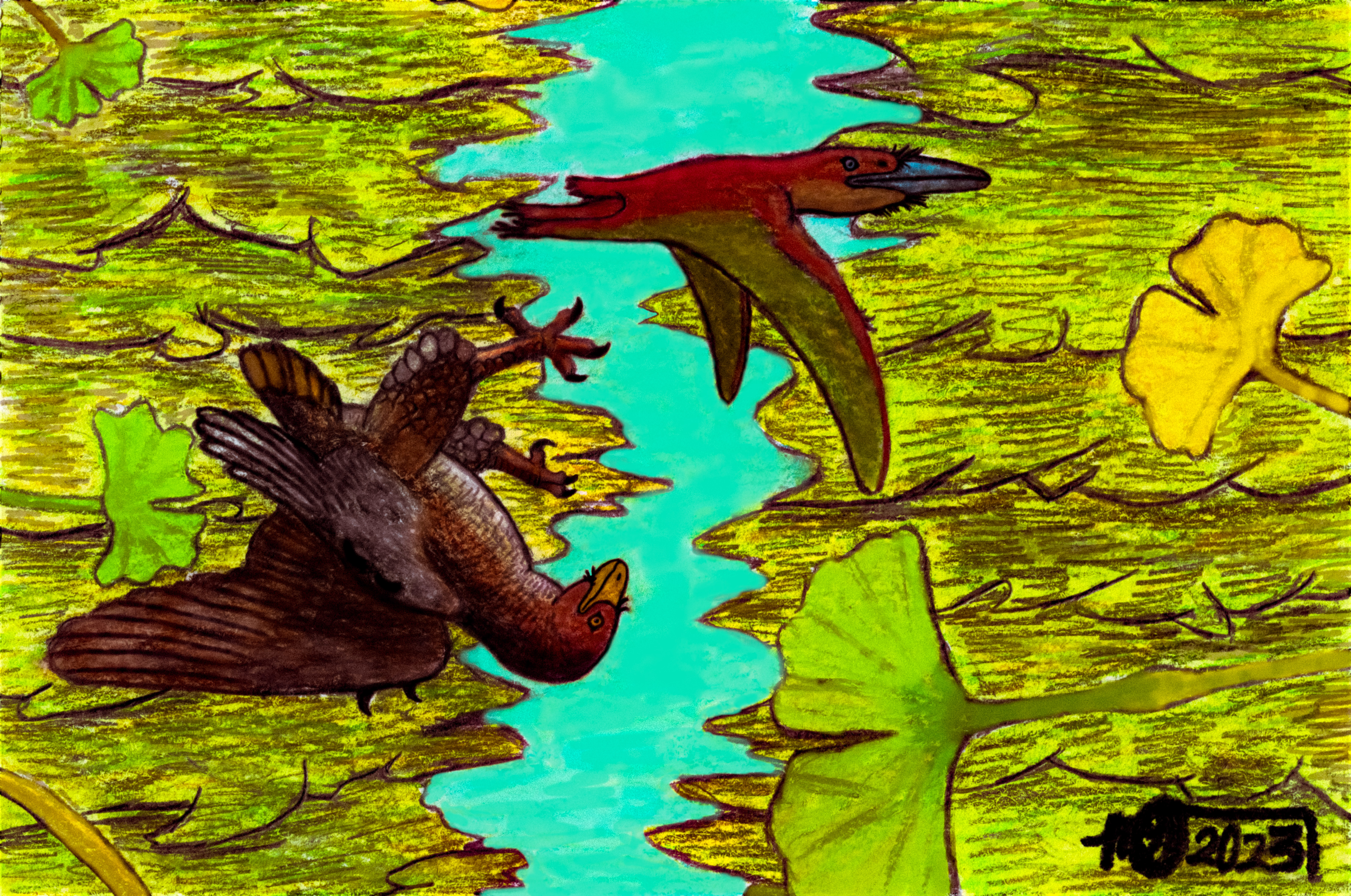
- Life restoration of Cratonavis (left)

Scientific classification
- Kingdom: Animalia
- Phylum: Chordata
- Class: Reptilia
- Clade: Dinosauria
- Clade: Saurischia
- Clade: Theropoda
- Clade: Avialae
- Family: †Jinguofortisidae
- Genus: †Cratonavis; Li et al., 2023
- Species: †C. zhui

Binomial name
- †Cratonavis zhui Li et al., 2023

= Cratonavis =

Cratonavis Temporal range: Early Cretaceous (Aptian), ~120 Ma

Extinct bird genus

Cratonavis (meaning "Craton bird") is an extinct genus of pygostylian avialian from the Early Cretaceous Jiufotang Formation of Liaoning Province, China. The genus contains a single species, C. zhui, known from a complete skeleton.

== Discovery and naming ==
The holotype specimen, IVPP V31106, was discovered in sediments of the Jiufotang Formation, dated to the Aptian age of the early Cretaceous period, near the Xiaotaizi village, (Jianchang County) of Liaoning Province, northeastern China. This specimen consists of a complete, articulated individual with preserved feathers.

In 2023, Li Zhiheng, Wang Min, Thomas A. Stidham, and Zhou Zhonghe described Cratonavis zhui, a new genus and species of jinguofortisid, based on these fossil remains. The generic name, "Cratonavis", combines a reference to the North China Craton with the Latin word "avis", meaning "bird". The specific name, "zhui", honors the Chinese geologist Zhu Rixiang, who has studied the destruction of the North China Craton.

== Classification ==
Li et al. (2023) recovered Cratonavis as a non-ornithothoracine pygostylian member of the Jinguofortisidae, as the sister taxon to Chongmingia. Their results are shown in the cladogram below:

- Avialae
  - †Archaeopteryx
  - - †Jeholornis
    - Pygostylia
      - †Sapeornis
      - †Jinguofortisidae
        - Jinguofortis
        - - Cratonavis
          - Chongmingia
      - †Confuciusornithidae
      - Ornithothoraces
        - Euornithes
        - †Enantiornithes
