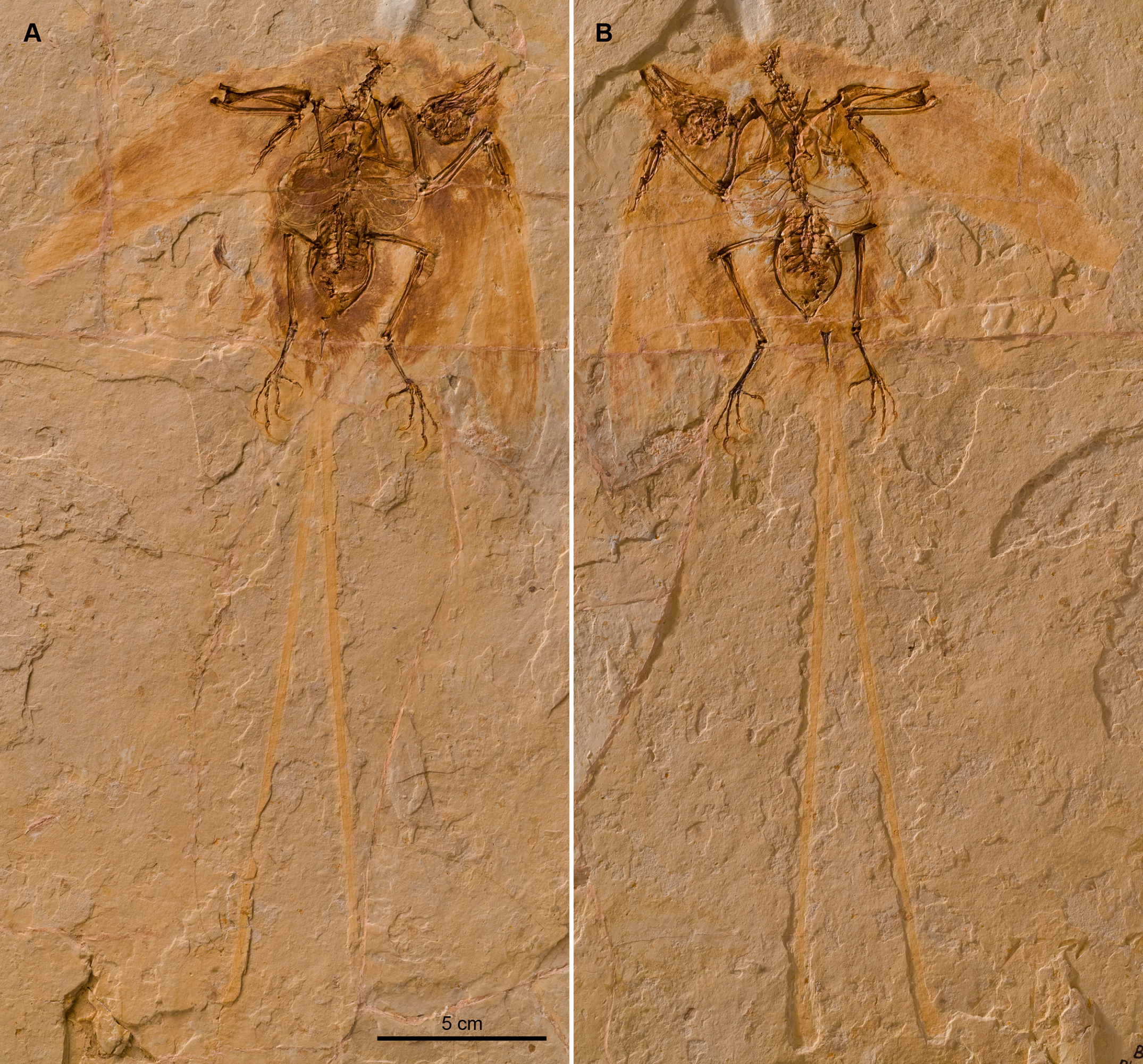
- Fossil of an enantiornithean (Junornis houi)
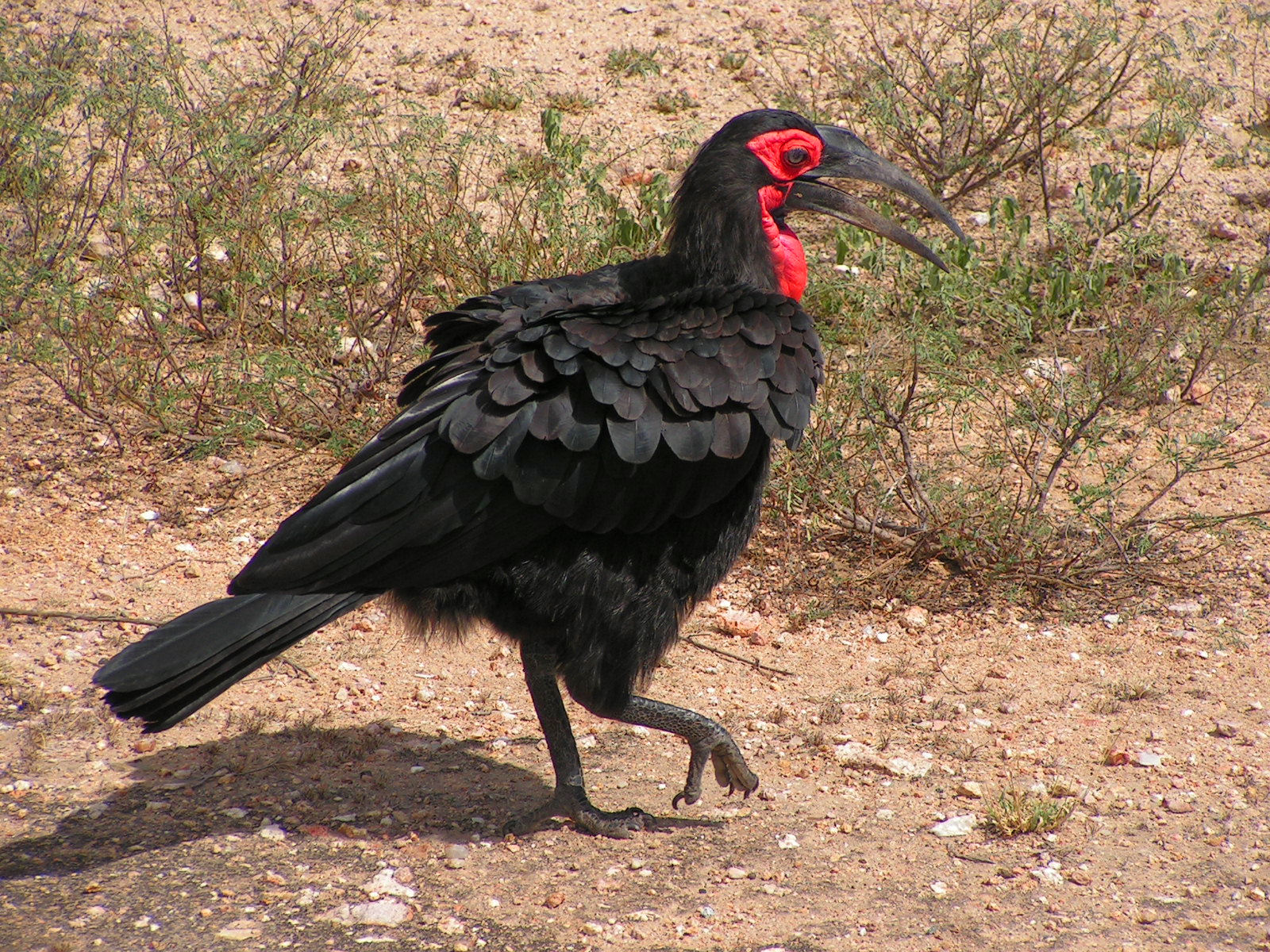
- Southern ground hornbill (Bucorvus leadbeateri)

Scientific classification
- Kingdom: Animalia
- Phylum: Chordata
- Clade: Dinosauria
- Clade: Saurischia
- Clade: Theropoda
- Clade: Avialae
- Clade: Pygostylia
- Clade: Ornithothoraces; Chiappe & Calvo, 1994

Subgroups
- †Enantiornithes; Euornithes

= Ornithothoraces =

Ornithothoracines Temporal range: Early Cretaceous–Present, 136–0 Ma

Clade of dinosaurs

Ornithothoraces is a group of avialan dinosaurs that includes all enantiornithes ("opposite birds") and the euornithes ("true birds"), which includes modern birds and their closest ancestors. The name Ornithothoraces means "bird thoraxes". This refers to the modern, highly advanced anatomy of the thorax that gave the ornithothoracines superior flight capability compared with more primitive avialans. This anatomy includes a large, keeled breastbone, elongated coracoids and a modified glenoid joint in the shoulder, and a semi-rigid rib cage. In spite of this at least the sternum seems to have developed convergently rather than being a true homology.

The earliest known members of the group are the enantiornitheans Protopteryx fengningensis, Eopengornis martini, and Cruralispennia multidonta, as well as the euornithine Archaeornithura meemannae, all from the Sichakou Member of the Huajiying Formation in China, which has been dated to 130.7 million years old. At least one other enantiornithean, Noguerornis gonzalezi, may be even older, at up to 145.5 million years ago, though its exact age is uncertain.

== Classification ==
In 1994, Chiappe and Calvo established a phylogenetic definition of the group. They defend Ornithothoraces as a node-based clade, the common ancestor of Iberomesornis romerali and modern birds, and all of its other descendants. In 1998, Paul Sereno defined Ornithothoraces in the same way, but used Sinornis santensis instead of Iberomesornis romerali.

The cladogram below follows the results of a phylogenetic analysis by Wang et al., 2016:

- Ornithothoraces
  - †Enantiornithes
    - - †Protopteryx
      - †Pengornithidae
    - - - †Eoenantiornis
        - †Bohaiornithidae
      - - †Fortunguavis
        - - †Longipterygidae
          - - †Eocathayornis
            - - †Cathayornis
              - - †Vescornis
                - †Neuquenornis
                - †Gobipteryx
                - †Eoalulavis
                - - †Qiliania
                  - †Concornis
  - Euornithes
    - †Archaeorhynchus
    - Ornithuromorpha
      - †Patagopteryx
      - †Vorona
      - - †Schizooura
        - - †Hongshanornithidae
          - - †Jianchangornis
            - - †Songlingornithidae
              - - †Gansus
                - - †Apsaravis
                  - Ornithurae
