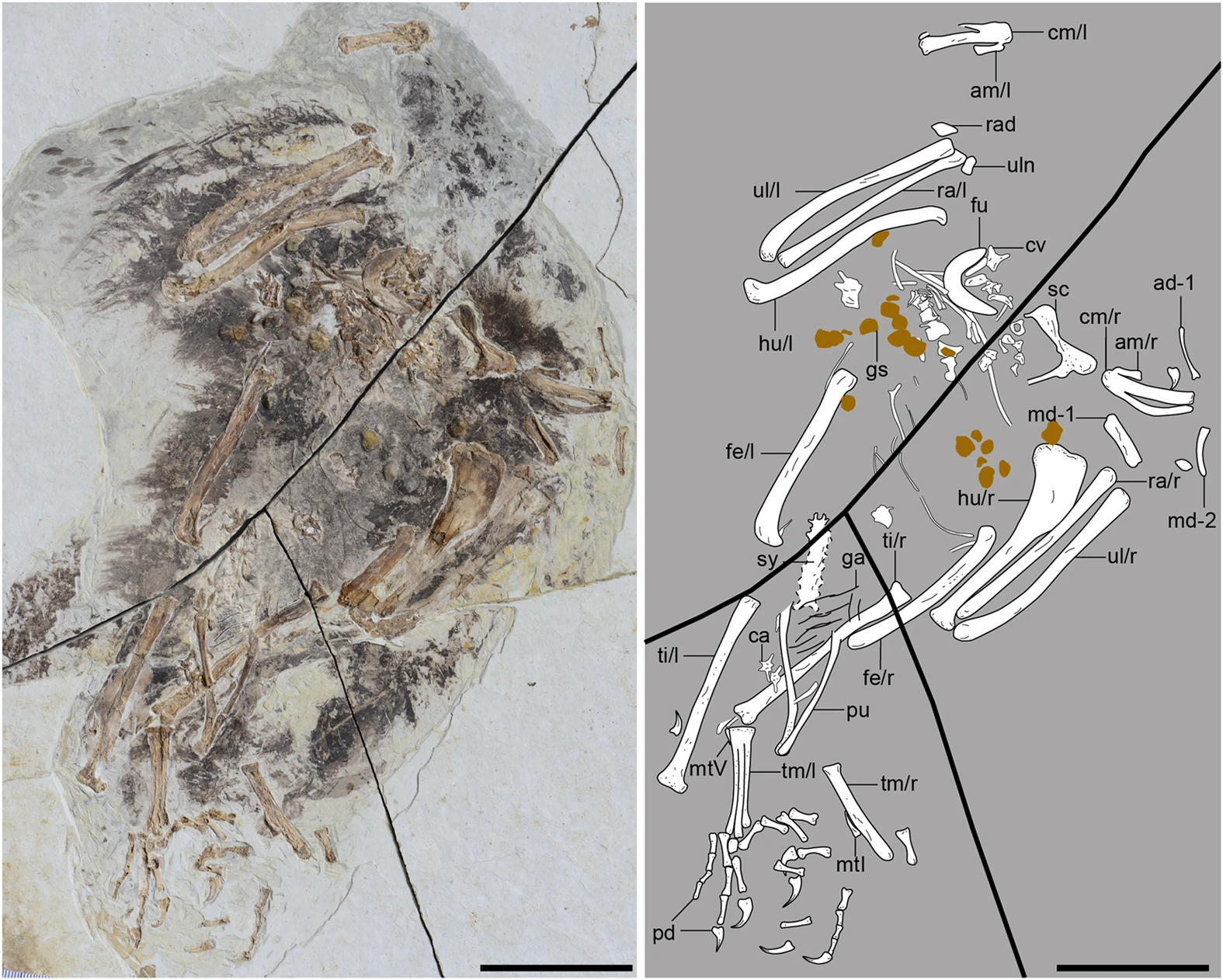
- Photograph and line drawing of the holotype of Chongmingia.

Scientific classification
- Kingdom: Animalia
- Phylum: Chordata
- Clade: Dinosauria
- Clade: Saurischia
- Clade: Theropoda
- Clade: Avialae
- Family: †Jinguofortisidae
- Genus: †Chongmingia; Wang et al., 2016

Type species
- Chongmingia zhengi Wang et al., 2016

= Chongmingia =

Chongmingia Temporal range: Early Cretaceous (Aptian) 121.4–113.0 Ma

Extinct genus of dinosaurs

Chongmingia is a genus of basal avialan belonging to Pygostylia that lived during the Aptian. It was found in the Jiufotang Formation in Chaoyang, China, and was described by Wang et al., 2016. The name comes from the word Chongming, referring to a Chinese mythological bird, and the specific epithet is in honor of Mr. Xiaoting Zheng.

== Taxonomy ==
The species was first described in 2015; the description appeared in the pages of Scientific Reports. Only the holotype, extracted from the Jehol Biota sediments from the Early Cretaceous period in north-east China, was discovered. Chongmingia zhengi represents a developmental line unknown at the time of description, it illustrates the diversity of traits in contemporary birds. The furcula in C. zhengi was stiff, which indicates their poor performance and the need to use more force on the fly. On the other hand, the relatively long forelimb and well-developed chest and shoulder keel on the humerus may indicate that the bird was able to provide enough strength to rise into the air. The presence of gastroliths indicates the prevalence of herbivory in early birds. Depending on the point of view, C. zhengi represents a previously unknown sister taxa to the Ornithothoraces clade, belonging to Avialae, or a sister taxon to a clade made up of all other Avialae except Archaeopteryx.

The creators of the genus proposed two possible cladograms depicting kinship between C. zhengi and related taxa. The proposal that the new genus is a sister group for a clade made up of all the other avialans except Archaeopteryx is marked in green, while the competitive hypothesis for the Ornithothoraces sister group in its shown in blue.

- Dromaeosauridae
- Avialae
  - Archaeopteryx
  - - Chongmingia zhengi
    - - Jeholornis
      - Pygostylia
        - Confuciusornis
        - - Sapeornis
          - - Chongmingia zhengi
            - Ornithothoraces

In the 2018 description of the basal pygostylian Jinguofortis, Chongmingia was recovered as a basal pygostylian sister to the former genus, and both genera placed in the new family Jinguofortisidae.

In 2023, a third jinguofortisid was described by Li et al. They recovered their new taxon, Cratonavis, as the sister taxon to Chongmingia. The results of their phylogenetic analyses are shown in the cladogram below.

- Avialae
  - †Archaeopteryx
  - - †Jeholornis
    - Pygostylia
      - †Sapeornis
      - †Jinguofortisidae
        - Jinguofortis
        - - Cratonavis
          - Chongmingia
      - †Confuciusornithidae
      - - Ornithothoraces
          - Ornithuromorpha
          - † Enantiornithes
