= Gobipterygidae =

Gobipterygidae Temporal range: Early-Late Cretaceous, 122–72 Ma

Scientific classification
- Kingdom: Animalia
- Phylum: Chordata
- Class: Reptilia
- Clade: Dinosauria
- Clade: Saurischia
- Clade: Theropoda
- Clade: Avialae
- Clade: †Enantiornithes
- Clade: †Euenantiornithes
- Family: †Gobipterygidae; Elzanowski, 1974

Genera
- †Gobipipus?; †Gobipteryx; †Jibeinia?; †Vescornis?

Extinct family of birds

Gobipterygidae is a family of extinct enantiornithine birds known from the Cretaceous of Asia.
