= Huajiying Formation =

Geologic formation in China

- Stratigraphic range: Valanginian-Aptian
- Type: Geological formation
- Unit of: Jehol Group
- Sub-units: Guohedao Member, Nianzigou Member, Qiaotou Member, Sichakou Member
- Underlies: Quingshila Formation
- Overlies: Dabeigou Formation

Location
- Region: Hebei
- Country: China

The Huajiying Formation is a geological formation in Hebei, People's Republic of China. Known for its fossils including feathered dinosaurs, the age of the formation is uncertain. It may represent an early portion of the Jehol Biota, dating to somewhere in the early Cretaceous or late Jurassic periods. It may correlate with the early Cretaceous Dadianzi Formation and parts of the Yixian Formation, with an age range between 140 and 122 Ma ago. It contains the Qiaotou Member, sometimes treated as a distinct formation.

== Age and stratigraphy ==
The Huajiying Formation contains the following members, in order from youngest to oldest:

- 5th Volcanic Member
- Guohedao Sedimentary Member
- 4th Volcanic Member
- Nianzigou Sedimentary Member
- 3rd Volcanic Member
- Qiaotou Sedimentary Member
- 2nd Volcanic Member
- Sichakou Sedimentary Member
- 1st Volcanic Member

The age of the formation is uncertain. Ji and colleagues suggested in 2008 that the Qiaotou Member correlates with the Dawangzhangzi bed of the Yixian Formation, dated to ~122 Ma ago by Zhou in 2006. Ji et al. also suggested that the lower Sichakou Member correlates with the Dadianzi Formation, dated to 140 Ma ago by Tian and colleagues in 2003.

== Paleobiota ==
The faunal lists below are based on a survey of the Huajiying Formation by Jin Fan and colleagues in 2008, unless otherwise noted.

Color key: Taxon / Reclassified taxon / Taxon falsely reported as present / Dubious taxon or junior synonym / Ichnotaxon / Ootaxon / Morphotaxon	Notes; Uncertain or tentative taxa are in small text; ~~crossed out~~ taxa are discredited.

=== Theropods ===
Genus	Species	County	Member	Abundance	Notes	Images
Archaeornithura	A. meemannae	Fengning	Sichakou Member		A hongshanornithid ornithuromorph; the only known ornithuromorph from the Huajiying Formation. Lifestyle possibly similar to that of modern wading birds (such as plovers).	Archaeornithura holotype
Cruralispennia	C. multidonta		Sichakou Member		An enantiornithine. Convergently evolved many ornithuromorph features.	Restoration of Cruralispennia depicting the colors it likely had in life
Eoconfuciusornis	E. zhengi		Sichakou Member		A confuciusornithid pygostalian avialan. Known from two specimens. Second specimen (referred in 2017) preserves soft tissues. Previously reported from the Dabeigou Formation.	
Eopengornis	E. martini		Sichakou Member		A pengornithid enantiornithine. Preserves many similarities with Pengornis, for which it is named. The oldest pengornithid.	
"Hebeiornis"	"H. fengningensis"		Qiaotou Member		Nomen nudum/objective junior synonym of Vescornis. Some authors consider Vescornis as the synonym to this taxon, as 'Hebeiornis' was established first (1999; Vescornis named in 2004).	
Jibeinia	J. luanhera		Qiaotou Member		An enantiornithine. Similar to Vescornis, potentially synonymous. Only known specimen missing. Previously reported from the Yixian Formation.	
Jinfengopteryx	J. elegans		Qiaotou Member		A troodontid. The genus namesake of the troodontid subfamily Jinfengopteryginae. Previously reported from the Yixian Formation.	Jinfengopteryx
Orienantius	O. ritteri		Sichakou Member		A basal enantiornithine. Known from two specimens. Preservation of soft tissues best visualized under ultraviolet light.	
Paraprotopteryx	P. gracilis		Qiaotou Member		A basal enantiornithine; presumably related and similar to Protopteryx. Preserves 4 long rectrices; 2 of which may be the result of artifice. Previously reported from the Yixian Formation.	
Protopteryx	P. fengningensis		Sichakou Member		A basal enantiornithine. Known from five specimens. Previously reported from the Yixian Formation.	Protopteryx_fengningensis_(BMNHC_Ph1060A)_NMNS
Shenqiornis	S. mengi		Qiaotou Member		A bohaiornithid enantiornithine. First described member of the family.	
Vescornis	V. hebeiensis		Qiaotou Member		A gobipterygid enantiornithine. Similar to Jibeinia, potentially synonymous. Known specimen preserves mainly impressions of bone. Named from same specimen as 'Hebeiornis'; potentially synonymous. Previously reported from the Yixian Formation.	
Xunmenglong	X. yinlianglis		Sichakou Member		A compsognathid. The smallest known member of the family; about the same size as the Scipionyx samniticus holotype. Had disproportionately long lower legs.	

=== Pterosaurs ===
Genus	Species	County	Member	Abundance	Notes	Images
Cratonopterus	C. huabei	Fengning			A ctenochasmatid	
Ornithocheiroidea	Indeterminate	Fengning			Partial skeleton of an indeterminate ornithocheiroid	

=== Fishes ===
Genus	Species	County	Member	Abundance	Notes	Images
Lycoptera	L. davidi			Also present in the Jiufotang Formation & Yixian Formation	An osteoglossomorph	Lycoptera davidi Yanosteus longidorsalis
Lycoptera	L. tokunagai				An osteoglossomorph	Lycoptera davidi Yanosteus longidorsalis
Peipiaosteus	P. fengningensis				A fish related to sturgeons	Lycoptera davidi Yanosteus longidorsalis
Protopsephurus	P. liui			Also present in the Jiufotang & Yixian Formations	A paddlefish	Lycoptera davidi Yanosteus longidorsalis
Yanosteus	Y. longidorsalis			Also present in the Yixian Formation	A peipiaosteid	Lycoptera davidi Yanosteus longidorsalis

=== Invertebrates ===
Genus	Species	County	Member	Abundance	Notes	Images
Yanjiestheria	Y. huajiyingensis			Well-preserved remains and eggs.	A spinicaudatan	
