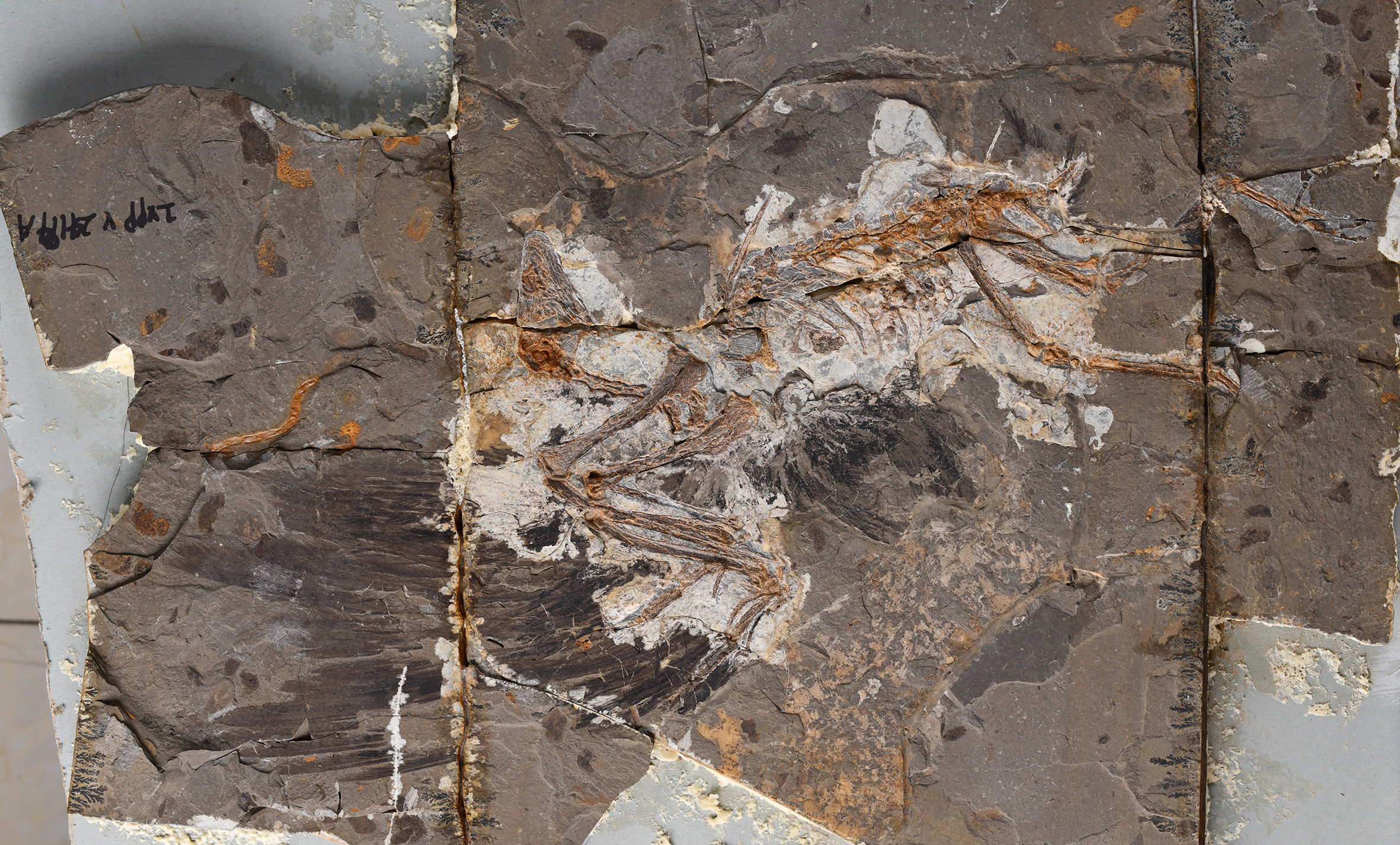
- Type specimen of Jinguofortis perplexus

Scientific classification
- Kingdom: Animalia
- Phylum: Chordata
- Class: Reptilia
- Clade: Dinosauria
- Clade: Saurischia
- Clade: Theropoda
- Clade: Avialae
- Clade: Pygostylia
- Family: †Jinguofortisidae; Wang et al., 2018

Genera
- †Chongmingia; †Cratonavis; †Jinguofortis

= Jinguofortisidae =

Jinguofortisids Temporal range: Early Cretaceous, 135–113 Ma

Extinct family of dinosaurs

Jinguofortisidae is an extinct family of early pygostylian dinosaurs known from the Early Cretaceous. They were found in northern China.

== Description ==
The Jinguofortisidae are distinguished from other non-ornithothoracine avialans by the following features: the scapula and coracoid fused into a scapulocoracoid; a boomeranged-shaped furcula without a hypocleidium; proximal margin of humerus concave centrally; deltopectoral crest large and not perforated; minor metacarpal markedly bowed caudally; alular digit terminating at the level of the distal end of major metacarpal; and proximal phalanx of the major digit longer than the intermediate phalanx.

== Phylogeny ==
Wang et al. (2018) erected Jinguofortisidae after finding Chongmingia (previously considered Avebrevicauda incertae sedis by Wang et al. 2016) to be sister to their new taxon Jinguofortis.

In 2023, a third jinguofortisid was described by Li et al. They recovered their new taxon, Cratonavis, as the sister taxon to Chongmingia. The results of their phylogenetic analyses are shown in the cladogram below:

- Avialae
  - †Archaeopteryx
  - - †Jeholornis
    - Pygostylia
      - †Sapeornis
      - †Jinguofortisidae
        - Jinguofortis
        - - Cratonavis
          - Chongmingia
      - †Confuciusornithidae
      - - Ornithothoraces
          - Ornithuromorpha
          - † Enantiornithes
