= List of fossils with consumulites =

This list of fossils with consumulites contains fossil specimens discovered to contain the preserved remains of food that the deceased animal had ingested during life. Such consumulites are a type of bromalite, the broader term applied to fossilized material ingested by an animal including waste expelled from the body like feces (coprolites) and vomit (regurgitalites). Consumulites are divided into three categories food in the animal's mouth when it died (oralites), food in the animal's throat when it died (esophagolites), partially digested stomach contents (gastrolites, not to be confused with gastroliths), and food found in the animal's intestinal tract (cololites).

== Amphibians ==
Nickname	Catalogue number	Institution	Taxon	Age	Unit	Country	Notes	Images
N/A			Sclerocephalus					Life restoration of Sclerocephalus.
N/A			Sclerocephalus					
N/A			Milnererpeton huberi					
N/A			Apateon kontheri					
N/A			Melanerpeton eisfeldi					
N/A			Melanerpeton sembachense					
N/A			Glanochthon					
N/A			Trimerorhachis					Model of a restored Trimerorhachis.
N/A			Micromelerpeton					
N/A			Archegosaurus					Life restoration of Archegosaurus.
N/A			Cheliderpeton					Life restoration of Cheliderpeton.
N/A			Apateon flagrifer					
N/A			Isodectes					Life restoration of Isodectes.

== Arthropods ==
Nickname	Catalogue number	Institution	Taxon	Age	Unit	Country	Notes	Images
N/A			Utahcaris orion					

== Cartilaginous fishes ==
Nickname	Catalogue number	Institution	Taxon	Age	Unit	Country	Notes	Images
N/A			Triodus					Life restoration of Triodus.
N/A			Nebraska sharks toren gallery					
N/A			Hybodont shark		Sundance Formation			
N/A								

== Choristoderes ==
Nickname	Catalogue number	Institution	Taxon	Age	Unit	Country	Notes	Images
N/A			Choristodere					
N/A								

== Coelacanths ==
Nickname	Catalogue number	Institution	Taxon	Age	Unit	Country	Notes	Images
N/A			Macropoma					Macropoma.
N/A								

== Dinosaurs ==
Nickname	Catalogue number	Institution	Taxon	Age	Unit	Country	Notes	Images
N/A	QM F18101		Kunbarrasaurus					Model of a restored Kunbarrasaurus.
N/A			Sinocalliopteryx					Life restoration of Sinocalliopteryx.
N/A			Microraptor					Life restoration of Microraptor.
N/A			Microraptor					
N/A			Sinocalliopteryx					
N/A			Velociraptor					Life restoration of Velociraptor.
N/A			Coelophysis					Life restoration of Coelophysis.
N/A			Coelophysis					
N/A			Sinosauropteryx					Life restoration of Sinosauropteryx.
N/A			Sinosauropteryx					
N/A			Daspletosaurus					Life restoration of Daspletosaurus.
N/A			Baryonyx					Life restoration of a Baryonyx feeding on a fish.
N/A			Brachylophosaurus canadensis					
N/A								
	TMP 2011.033.0001	Royal Tyrrell Museum of Palaeontology	Borealopelta markmitchelli	Cretaceous		Canada		

== Ichthyosaurs ==
Nickname	Catalogue number	Institution	Taxon	Age	Unit	Country	Notes	Images
N/A			Ophthalmosaurus natans					Life restoration of Ophthalmosaurus.
N/A								

== Mammals ==
Nickname	Catalogue number	Institution	Taxon	Age	Unit	Country	Notes	Images
N/A			Repenomamus					Life restoration of a Repenomamus feeding on a Psittacosaurus.
N/A								

== Mosasaurs ==
Nickname	Catalogue number	Institution	Taxon	Age	Unit	Country	Notes	Images
N/A	SDSMT 10439		Tylosaurus proriger			United States		Life restoration of Tylosaurus proriger.
N/A			Hainosaurus					
N/A			Plotosaurus			United States		Life restoration of Plotosaurus.
N/A			Tylosaurus			United States		
N/A			Globidens					Life restoration of Globidens.
N/A								

== Plesiosaurs ==
Nickname	Catalogue number	Institution	Taxon	Age	Unit	Country	Notes	Images
N/A			Polycotylidae			Japan		Artist's restoration of a polycotylid.
N/A	NJSM 15435		Styxosaurus snowii					Life restoration of Styxosaurus.
N/A	NHM R3317		Peloneustes	Callovian	Oxford Clay	United Kingdom		Life restoration of Peloneustes.
N/A	PETMG R296		Simolestes vorax		Oxford Clay	United Kingdom		Life restoration of Simolestes.
N/A	UW 24215		Tatenectes laramiensis	Oxfordian	Sundance Formation	United States		
N/A			Pliosaurus brachyspondylus	Kimmeridgian	Kimmeridge Clay	United Kingdom		Life restoration of Pliosaurus.
N/A			Pliosaurus brachyspondylus	Kimmeridgian	Kimmeridge Clay	United Kingdom		
N/A	USNM 50132		Thalassomedon hanningtoni	Cenomanian	Graneros Shale	United States		Life restoration of Thalassomedon.
N/A	UMUT MV 19965		Pliosaur	Cenomanian	Yezo Group	Japan		
N/A			Plesiosaur	Santonian	Yezo Group	Japan		
N/A	P80.06.14		Dolichorhynchops osborni	Campanian	Pierre Shale	Canada		
N/A	P83.01.18		Elasmosaur		Pierre Shale	Canada		
N/A	AMNH 5803		Plesiosaur	Campanian	Pierre Shale	United States		
N/A	SDM 14267		Polycotylidae	Campanian	Pierre Shale	United States		
N/A	KUVP 1329		Elasmosauridae	Campanian	Pierre Shale	United States		
N/A	ANSP 10081		Elasmosaurus platyurus	Campanian	Pierre Shale	United States		Life restoration of Elasmosaurus.
N/A			Pantosaurus striatus					
N/A			Megalneusaurus rex					Life restoration of Megalneusaurus.
N/A								

== Pterosaurs ==
Nickname	Catalogue number	Institution	Taxon	Age	Unit	Country	Notes	Images
N/A	CM 11427	Carnegie Museum of Natural History	Rhamphorhynchus muensteri					Life restoration of Rhamphorhynchus
N/A	TMP 2008.41.001	Royal Tyrrell Museum of Palaeontology	Rhamphorhynchus muensteri					
Mr. Greedy Guts		Jura Museum	Rhamphorhynchus muensteri					
	WDC CSG 255		Rhamphorhynchus muensteri					Specimen WDC CSG 255, exhibiting a Rhamphorhynchus with preserved stomach contents which itself was trapped between the jaws of an Aspidorhynchus.
			Pteranodon			United States		

== Ray-finned fishes ==
Nickname	Catalogue number	Institution	Taxon	Age	Unit	Country	Notes	Images
N/A			Hulettia americana					
N/A	NMMNH P-32715		Todiltia schoewei					
N/A	NMMNH P-32713		Todiltia schoewei					
N/A	NMMNH P-32718		Todiltia schoewei					
N/A	NMMNH P-32712		Todiltia schoewei					
N/A	NMMNH P-14470		Todiltia schoewei					
Fish-Within-A-Fish			Xiphactinus					Xiphactinus
N/A			Cimolichthys					
N/A			Leptecodon					
N/A	WDC CSG 255		Aspidorhynchus acutirostris					Specimen WDC CSG 255, exhibiting a Rhamphorhynchus with preserved stomach contents which itself was trapped between the jaws of an Aspidorhynchus.
N/A			Aspidorhynchus acutirostris					Life restoration of Aspidorhynchus.
N/A			Aspidorhynchus acutirostris					
N/A			Aspidorhynchus acutirostris					
N/A			Aspidorhynchus acutirostris					
N/A								

== Turtles ==
Nickname	Catalogue number	Institution	Taxon	Age	Unit	Country	Notes	Images
N/A			Stylemys					
N/A								
