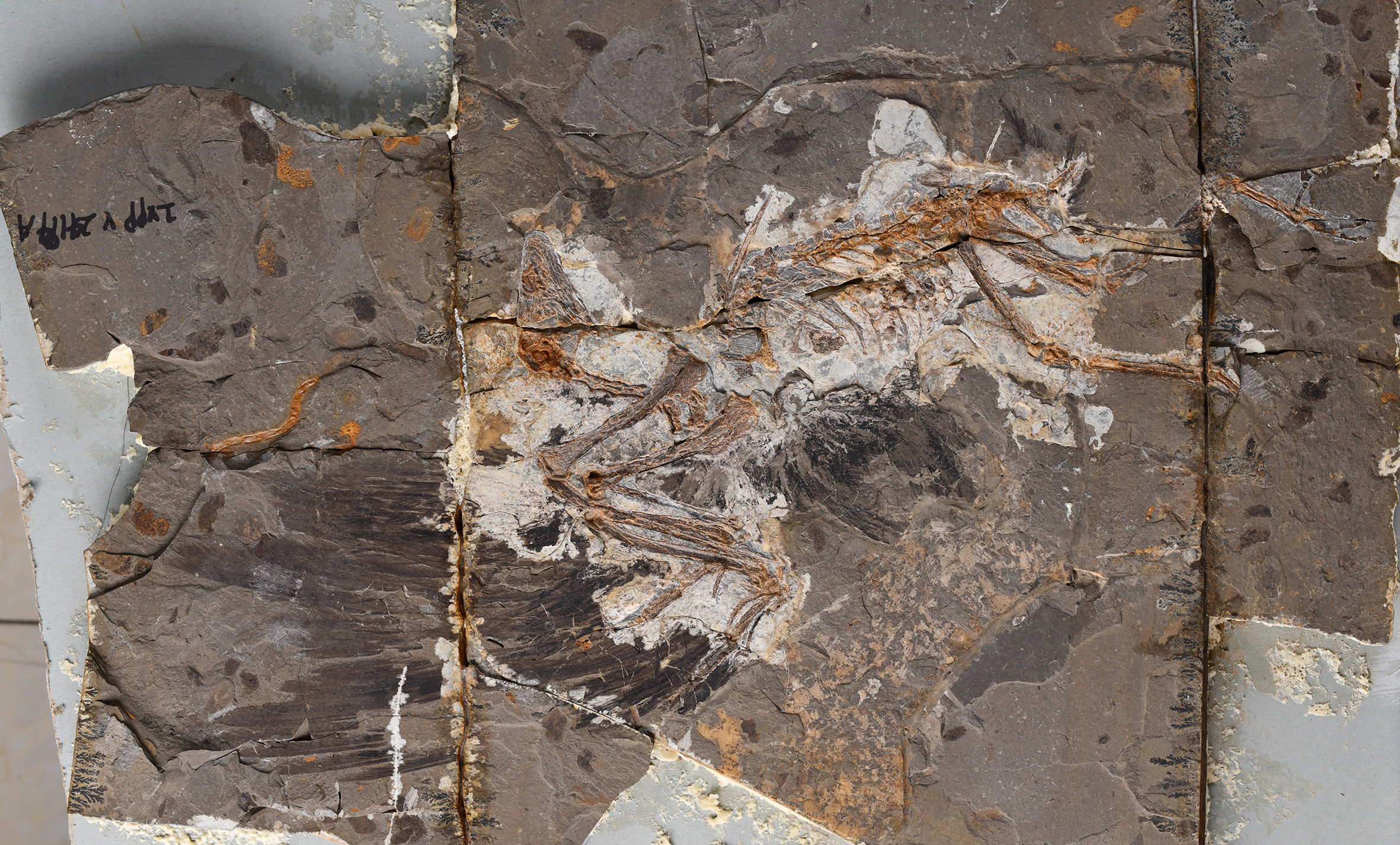
- Type specimen of Jinguofortis perplexus

Scientific classification
- Kingdom: Animalia
- Phylum: Chordata
- Clade: Dinosauria
- Clade: Saurischia
- Clade: Theropoda
- Clade: Avialae
- Family: †Jinguofortisidae
- Genus: †Jinguofortis; Wang et al., 2018

Type species
- Jinguofortis perplexus Wang et al., 2018

= Jinguofortis =

Jinguofortis Temporal range: Early Cretaceous (Barremian) 127 Ma

Extinct genus of dinosaurs

Jinguofortis is a genus of primitive avialan belonging to the clade Pygostylia that lived during the Valanginian stage of the Early Cretaceous. It was found in the Dabeigou Formation in northeastern China, and isotope dating from the samples overlying the bird-bearing horizon is 127 million years ago.

== Description ==
Jinguofortis is notable for having a combination of primitive and advanced traits. Some of these are typical of stemward avialans (further from modern birds) while others occur in crownward avialans (closer to modern birds). The scapula and coracoid bones of the shoulder girdle are fused into a single bone, the scapulocoracoid. A fused scapulocoracoid is a plesiomorphic (primitive) feature which is not present in modern birds. This plesiomorphic state is found in pterosaurs and non-avian dinosaurs, including coelurosaurian theropods ancestral to birds.

However, these bones become unfused in the famed early avialan Archaeopteryx, and in more crownward avian clades. Outside of Jinguofortis and its closest relatives, the presence of a fused scapulocoracoid is found only in confuciusornithids among other avialans. This is an apparent example of convergent evolution, suggesting that these early avialans likely acquired a high rate of osteogenesis (tendency for bone formation) similar to other theropods. Later, separation of the coracoid and scapula becomes evolutionarily “fixed” (with a few exceptions in the crown groups) across more advanced birds in the clade Ornithothoraces. By this time, the pectoral (shoulder) girdle developed further modifications, including an ossified sternal keel and formation of the triosseal canal. The strong tendency for convergent evolution in early avialans points to high developmental plasticity (various developmental strategies) for anatomical systems in the shoulder region.

Other traits are more advanced, such as the highly reduced digits of the hand. Jinguofortis is morphologically similar to Chongmingia, another early avialan which preserved a fused scapulocoracoid. The two genera were placed in a new family, Jinguofortisidae. However, Jinguofortis could still differentiated from Chongmingia in several ways. Its furcula was less robust, with a smaller angle of 70° between the clavicular branches. Pedal digit I (the first toe) was approximately 70% of the length of digit II (the second toe), which itself was shorter than digit IV (the fourth toe). In addition, these two taxa are separated in time by approximately seven million years.

== Etymology ==
The name Jinguofortis is a combination of jinguo, from Mandarin (巾帼), referring to female warrior, and fortis, Latin for brave.

== Classification ==
Wang et al. (2018) recovered Jinguofortis as a basal pygostylian more derived than Confuciusornithiformes, but more primitive than Sapeornithiformes, and as sister to the previously problematic genus Chongmingia. Cladogram of Mesozoic birds

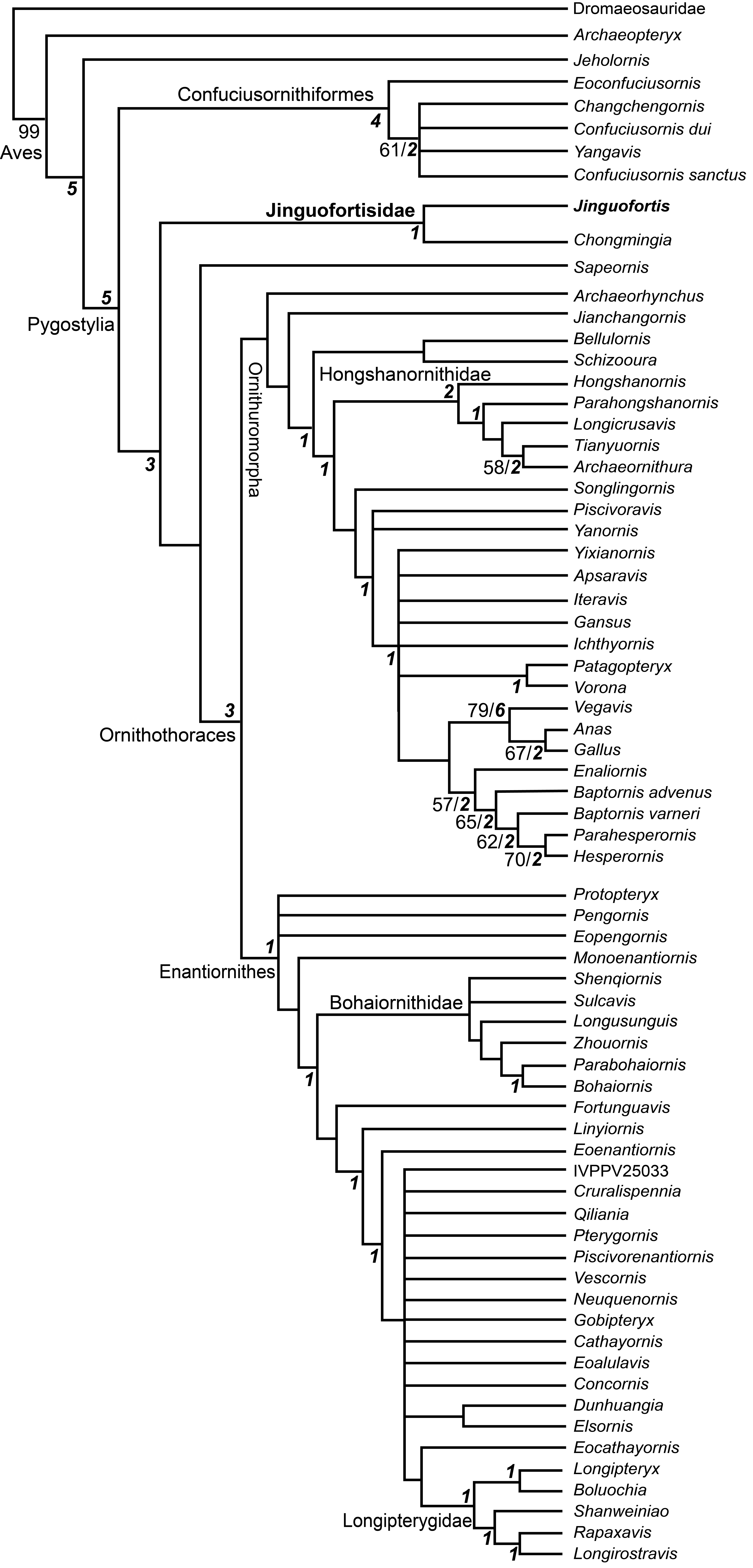
