= Dabeigou Formation =

Geologic formation in Hebei, China

- Stratigraphic range: mid Valanginian-mid Hauterivian; ~135–130 Ma
- Type: Geological formation
- Unit of: Jehol Biota
- Sub-units: Numbered Members
- Underlies: Dadianzi & Yixian Formations
- Overlies: Zhangjiakou Formation
- Thickness: Varies, in Yushuxia section 220 metres (720 ft)

Lithology
- Primary: Sandstone, mudstone
- Other: Tuffite, conglomerate, siltstone

Location
- Coordinates: 41.7°N 116.4°E
- Approximate paleocoordinates: 43.6°N 118.5°E
- Region: Hebei
- Country: China
- Dabeigou Formation (China) Dabeigou Formation (Hebei)

The Dabeigou Formation (simplified Chinese: 大北沟组; traditional Chinese: 大北溝組; pinyin: Dàběigōu zǔ) is a palaeontological formation located in Hebei, China. It dates from the mid Valanginian to Hauterivian age of the Cretaceous period, approximately 135 to 130 Ma.

== Fossil content ==
Fossils include the confuciusornithiform bird Eoconfuciusornis. As of 2016 this is the oldest bird with a toothless beak known, but it belongs to a very ancestral avian lineage not closely related to living birds.

Birds

- Jinguofortis perplexus

Amphibians

- Regalerpeton weichangensis

Insects

- Amplicella beipiaoensis
- A. exquisita
- A. shcherbakovi
- Brachyopteryx weichangensis
- Chresmoda multinervis
- C. shihi
- Coptoclava longipoda
- Glypta qingshilaensis
- Hebeicoris xinboensis
- Jibeigomphus xinboensis
- Manlayamyia dabeigouensis
- Mesasimulium laihaigouense
- M. laiyangensis
- Mesolygaeus hebeiensis
- Mesoplecia xinboensis
- Pleciofungivora yangtianense
- Priscotendipes mirus
- Vitimoilus ovatus
- Notocupes lentus
- Amplicella sp.
- Ichneumonidae indet.
- Tanychorinae indet.

== See also ==
- List of fossil sites
