= Jibeinia =

Jibeinia Temporal range: Early Cretaceous, 122 Ma
- Fossil specimen, Chaoyang Paleontological Museum

Scientific classification
- Kingdom: Animalia
- Phylum: Chordata
- Class: Reptilia
- Clade: Dinosauria
- Clade: Saurischia
- Clade: Theropoda
- Clade: Avialae
- Clade: †Enantiornithes
- Genus: †Jibeinia; Hou, 1997
- Species: †J. luanhera

Binomial name
- †Jibeinia luanhera Hou, 1997

Synonyms
- ?Vescornis Zhang et al., 2004

Extinct genus of birds

Jibeinia is a genus of enantiornithean bird. Only one species has been named, Jibeinia luanhera. It is known from one holotype fossil found in the Hebei province, People's Republic of China. This fossil is now lost. The holotype was, however, described and figured in detail by Hou (1997).

In the summer of 1993, the holotype was presented to engineer Li Pai of the Hebei Provincial Office of Geology by a local farmer. Li, along with Hou Linhai and Zhou Zhonghe, investigated the quarry from which it came, at the locality of the Dongtuyao brick factory, Northern Hebei Province, Linjituxiang Village. They determined that it was collected from the Yixian Formation. However, later research into the geology of the area showed that it actually came from similarly aged beds of the Huajiying Formation.

J. luanhera was described from a nearly complete fossil. The fossil seems not to have ever received a catalogue number, nor to have been accessioned by a museum.

== Possible synonyms ==
Zhang et al. described a new enantiornithean named Vescornis in 2004. They noted that it was nearly exactly the same size as Jibeinia, and collected from the same locality. They noted several morphological similarities to Jibeinia, but that it also differed in some characters from the written description. They sought to compare the two specimens but learned from Dr. Hou in 2001 that the holotype Jibeinia had been lost, and existing casts were of too poor a quality to be decisive. Thus they conclude that it will be impossible to rule out the possibility that the two are the same species, and that Vescornis is a junior synonym, unless the holotype of Jibeinia is rediscovered.

== Etymology ==
The genus name comes from a Latinized form of the Jíbei region and the character Jí, which refers to one of the nine geographical divisions of ancient China. The specific name is after the Luanhe River.
