= Vescornis =

Vescornis Temporal range: Early Cretaceous, 122 Ma

Scientific classification
- Kingdom: Animalia
- Phylum: Chordata
- Class: Reptilia
- Clade: Dinosauria
- Clade: Saurischia
- Clade: Theropoda
- Clade: Avialae
- Clade: †Enantiornithes
- Family: †Gobipterygidae
- Genus: †Vescornis; Zhang et al., 2004
- Species: †V. hebeiensis

Binomial name
- †Vescornis hebeiensis Zhang et al., 2004

Genus of birds

Vescornis is a genus of enantiornithine bird. One species is named, V. hebeiensis. The holotype fossil is in the collection of the Nanjing Institute of Geology and Paleontology, Chinese Academy of Sciences. Its catalog number is CAGS 130722. The fossil was found in Early Cretaceous rocks first attributed to the Yixian Formation, Senjitu, Fengning County, Hebei Province, China. However, later study of area geology showed that these rocks actually belong to the Huajiying Formation.

Vescornis was described in detail by Zhang et al. in 2004.

== Possible synonyms ==
The three taxa Jibeinia, Vescornis, and "Hebeiornis", may be synonyms. If so, because the name Jibeinia was published in 1997, it would be the senior synonym and take priority. However, there is no consensus over whether or not they are actually synonyms, and some scientists continue to regard them as separate species.

When Vescornis was described in 2004, the authors noted that it was nearly exactly the same size as Jibeinia, and collected from the same locality. They noted several morphological similarities to Jibeinia but, also, distinct differences in some characters from the written description. They sought to compare the two specimens but learned from Dr. Hou in 2001 that the holotype Jibeinia had been lost, and existing casts were of too poor a quality to be decisive. Thus they conclude that it will be impossible to verify whether the two are the same species, unless the holotype of Jibeinia is rediscovered.

The name "Hebeiornis" was published in 1999, based on the same specimen as Vescornis (CAGS 130722). However, the describers (Xu et al.) gave little anatomical detail and few comparisons to other taxa, and later researchers have concluded that this was not an adequate description to establish the new name, and it is now regarded as a nomen nudum.
