= Amplicella =

Scientific classification
- Kingdom: Animalia
- Phylum: Arthropoda
- Class: Insecta
- Order: Hymenoptera
- Family: Ichneumonidae
- Genus: †Amplicella; Kopylov, 2010

Genus of wasps

Amplicella is a genus of extinct hymenopteran.
