= Melanerpeton =

Melanerpeton Temporal range: Early Permian

Scientific classification
- Kingdom: Animalia
- Phylum: Chordata
- Clade: Tetrapoda
- Order: †Temnospondyli
- Family: †Branchiosauridae
- Genus: †Melanerpeton; Fritsch 1878

Type species
- †Melanerpeton pusillum Fritsch 1878

Other species
- †Melanerpeton arnhardti Werneburg, 1988; †Melanerpeton eisfeldi Werneburg, 1988; †Melanerpeton humbergense Boy, 1978; †Melanerpeton kuselense Schoch et al., 2026; †Melanerpeton sembachense Werneburg, 1989

Extinct genus of amphibians

Melanerpeton is an extinct genus of prehistoric amphibian that lived during the Permian approximately 285 million years ago in what would become Europe. Several species have traditionally been placed in the genus Melanerpeton but subsequently transferred to other genera. In their 2026 description of M. kuselense, Schoch and colleagues questioned the affinities of "M." arnhardti, "M." humbergense, and others, suggesting that these required restudy due to many distinct features between them and the type species, M. pusillum.
