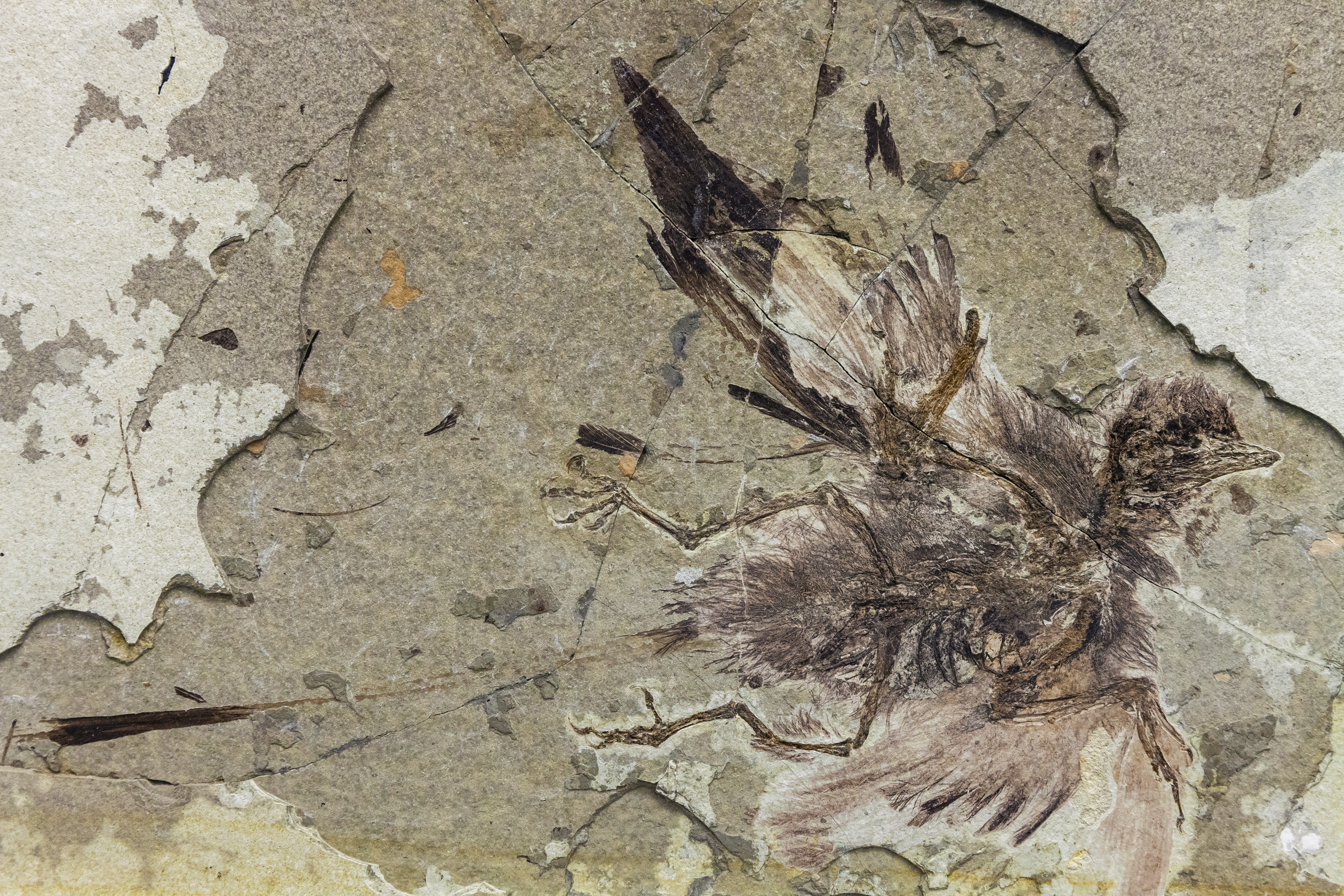
- Fossil specimen, National Museum of Natural Science

Scientific classification
- Kingdom: Animalia
- Phylum: Chordata
- Class: Reptilia
- Clade: Dinosauria
- Clade: Saurischia
- Clade: Theropoda
- Clade: Avialae
- Clade: †Enantiornithes
- Order: †Protopterygiformes; Zhang & Zhou, 2006
- Family: †Protopterygidae; Zhang & Zhou, 2006
- Genus: †Protopteryx; Zhang & Zhou, 2000
- Species: †P. fengningensis

Binomial name
- †Protopteryx fengningensis Zhang & Zhou, 2000

= Protopteryx =

Protopteryx Temporal range: Early Cretaceous, 131 Ma

Extinct genus of birds

Protopteryx is an extinct bird and possibly the basalmost enantiornithean, from the Cretaceous period. The type species is P. fengningensis. It was first discovered in the Sichakou Member of the Yixian Formation or Huajiying Formation of Hebei Province, northern China, dating from 131 Ma ago. Protopteryx has been found in the Daibeigou formation, as well. The name Protopteryx means "primitive feather": "proto-" meaning "the first of" and "-pteryx" meaning "feather" or "wing." The name comes from the fact that Protopteryx feathers are more primitive than those of modern birds, such as the two elongated tail feathers that lack barbs and rami.

== Description ==
Protopteryx fossils show that they were roughly the same as a today's starling. The adult body length of Protopteryx was about 10 centimetres (3.9 in), excluding the tail feathers. Protopteryx teeth were conical and unserrated, and some teeth had a resorption pit similar to those seen in Archaeopteryx. The body of Protopteryx was covered in three types of feathers: down feathers, flight feathers, and long, ribbon-like tail feathers. The body was mostly covered in feathers of about 12 millimetres (0.47 in). The barbs of the down feathers were laminar instead of hairlike and were frayed at the tips. The most distinctive feature of Protopteryx is that the tail consisted of two long feathers which only had barbs at their tips. Closer to the body, the long tail feathers were thin and needle-like. The only modern bird to share a feather type similar to Protopteryx is the red bird-of-paradise. The tail feathers also lack rami on the proximal end of the tail.

== Classification ==
Protopteryx is one of the most basal known members of the group Enantiornithes. It appeared after Archaeopteryx, one of the most basal birds, and Confuciusornis. Protopteryx is more basal than the species Eocathayornis and Paraprotopteryx.

== Discovery and geography ==
Protopteryx was discovered in the Sichakou Member of the Hebei province, west of the Liaoning province. The formations where Protopteryx was found were the Yixian and Dageibou formations. The Sichakou Basin is part of the Daxinganling-Taihangshan Tectonomagmatic Belt and moves in a north-northeast direction. When Protopteryx was alive, the Sichakou basin was located at the Hongqiangou-Jiecangou.

== Paleobiology ==
Protopteryx lived in the Jehol Biota in the Cretaceous period, which contains many of the terrestrial and freshwater vertebrate clades. The teeth of the Protopteryx are similar to Archaeopteryx, suggesting a similar diet.

=== Feather adaptations ===
Protopteryx was adapted for flying and had feathers with features similar to modern birds, as shown by its procoracoid, carina of the sternum, external tuberosity of the humerus, and deltoid crest, which suggest Protopteryx had a modern musculus supercoracoideus and pectoralis. Protopteryx also shares asymmetric wing flight feathers with flying birds, as well as Archaeopteryx and Confuciusornis. The tail feathers of Protopteryx lack of barbs and rami close to the body, suggesting a use outside of flight, such as display, thermoregulation, or sensory usage.

== See also ==
- Dinosaur coloration

== Sources ==
- http://www.fossilmuseum.net/Fossil-Pictures/Birds/Protopteryx/Protopteryx-fengningensis.htm
- Mesozoic Birds: Above the Heads of Dinosaurs by Luis M. Chiappe and Lawrence M. Witmer
