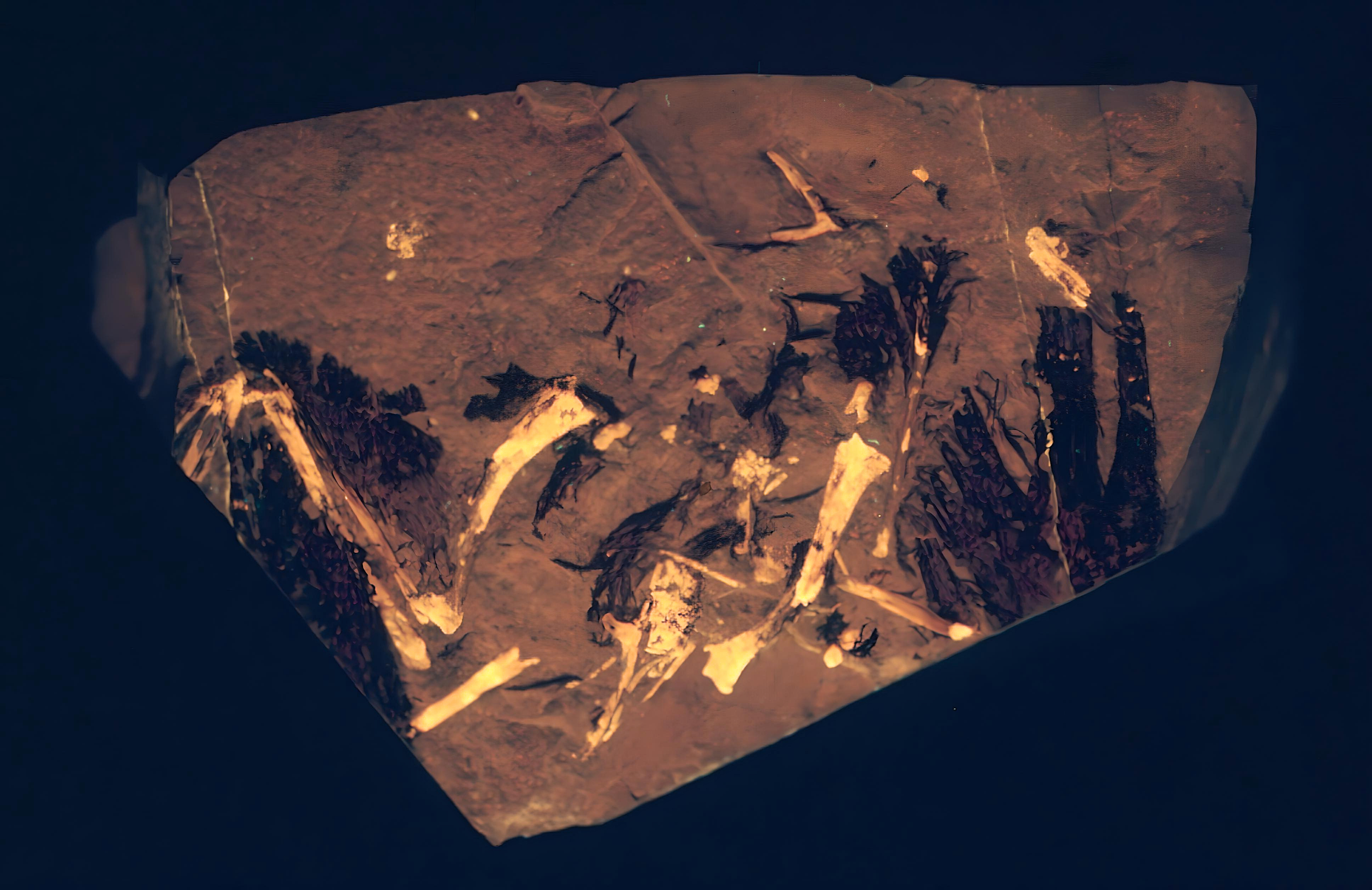

Scientific classification
- Kingdom: Animalia
- Phylum: Chordata
- Class: Reptilia
- Clade: Dinosauria
- Clade: Saurischia
- Clade: Theropoda
- Clade: Avialae
- Clade: †Enantiornithes
- Genus: †Noguerornis; Lacasa-Ruiz, 1989
- Species: †N. gonzalezi

Binomial name
- †Noguerornis gonzalezi Lacasa-Ruiz, 1989

= Noguerornis =

Noguerornis Temporal range: Early Cretaceous, 130 Ma

Extinct genus of birds

Noguerornis is a genus of enantiornithine bird possibly related to Iberomesornis. It lived during the Early Cretaceous (early Barremian age) about 130 mya and is known from fossils found in the La Pedrera de Rúbies Formation at El Montsec, Spain.
