= 2009 in archosaur paleontology =

The year 2009 in archosaur paleontology was eventful. Archosaurs include the only living dinosaur group — birds — and the reptile crocodilians, plus all extinct dinosaurs, extinct crocodilian relatives, and pterosaurs. Archosaur paleontology is the scientific study of those animals, especially as they existed before the Holocene Epoch began about 11,700 years ago. The year 2009 in paleontology included various significant developments regarding archosaurs.

This article records new taxa of fossil archosaurs of every kind that have been described during the year 2009, as well as other significant discoveries and events related to paleontology of archosaurs that occurred in the year 2009.

== Crurotarsans ==
- Delfino, M.; Smith, T. (2009). "A reassessment of the morphology and taxonomic status of 'Crocodylus' depressifrons Blainville, 1855 (Crocodylia, Crocodyloidea) based on the Early Eocene remains from Belgium". Zoological Journal of the Linnean Society. 156 (1): 140–167. doi:10.1111/j.1096-3642.2008.00478.x.

Newly named crurotarsans
Name	Status	Authors	Age	Unit	Location	Notes	Images
Armadillosuchus	Valid	Marinho; Carvalho	Late Cretaceous	Adamantina Formation	Brazil	Notosuchian with heavy, armadillo-like body armor consisting of flexible bands and rigid shields	Armadillosuchus
Barcinosuchus	Valid	Leardi; Pol	Aptian – Albian	Cerro Barcino Formation	Argentina	A peirosaurid	
Collilongus	Valid	Borsuk−Białynicka; Sennikov	Early Olenekian	Czatkowice 1	Poland	Possible rauisuchian	
Coringasuchus	Valid	Kellner; Pinheiro; et al. (Note: Kellner, Pinheiro, Azevedo, Henriques, de Carvalho, Oliveira.)	Early Cenomanian	Alcântara Formation	Brazil		
Duerosuchus	Valid	Santiago; Andrés	Middle Eocene		Spain		
Hypselorhachis	Valid	Butler; Barrett; et al. (Note: Butler, Barrett, Abel, Gower.)	Middle Triassic	Manda Beds	Tanzania	Possible ctenosauriscid	
Kaprosuchus	Valid	Sereno; Larson	Upper Cretaceous	Echkar Formation	Niger	Unusual large mahajangasuchid with hypertrophied caniniform teeth and posteriorly projecting horns	Kaprosuchus
Kemkemia	Valid	Cau & Maganuco	Cenomanian	Kem Kem Beds	Morocco	Initially identified as a theropod dinosaur, but subsequently discovered to be a crocodyliform.	
Khoratosuchus	Valid	Lauprasert; Cuny; et al. (Note: Lauprasert, Cuny, Thirakhupt, Suteethorn.)	Early Cretaceous		Thailand	Youngest Mesozoic crocodyliform yet known from Thailand	
Laganosuchus	Valid	Sereno; Larson	Cenomanian	Echkar Formation; Kem Kem Beds	Niger; Morocco		Laganosuchus
Miadanasuchus	Valid	Simons; Buckley	Campanian	Maevarano Formation	Madagascar	A new genus for "Trematochampsa" oblita (Buffetaut & Taquet, 1979)	
Morrinhosuchus	Valid	Iori; Carvalho	Late Cretaceous	Adamantina Formation	Brazil	Notosuchian from Brazil	
Penghusuchus	Valid	Shan; Wu; et al. (Note: Shan, Wu, Cheng, Sato.)	Late Miocene		Taiwan	A tomistomine crocodilian.	
Polonosuchus	Valid	Brusatte; Butler; et al. (Note: Brusatte, Butler, Sulej, Niedźwiedzki.)	Late Carnian		Poland	A new genus for "Teratosaurus" silesiacus (Sulej, 2005)	Polonosuchus
Yacarerani	Valid	Novas; Pais; et al. (Note: Novas, Pais, Pol, Carvalho, Mones, Scanferla, Riglos.)	Late Cretaceous	Cajones Formation	Bolivia		Yacarerani

== Non-avian dinosaurs ==
=== Research ===
- A new study on theropod furculae is published.
- A "detailed description of the skull and mandible of the Chinese cerapodan ornithischian dinosaur Jeholosaurus shangyuanensis" is published.
- Knoll, F.; Padian, K.; de Ricqles, A. (2009). "Ontogenetic change and adult body size of the early ornithischian dinosaur Lesothosaurus diagnosticus: Implications for basal ornithischian taxonomy". Gondwana Research. 17: 171–179. doi:10.1016/j.gr.2009.03.010.
- Matthews, J. C.; Brusatte, S. L.; Williams, S. A.; Henderson, M. D. (2009). "The first Triceratops bonebed and its implications for gregarious behavior". Journal of Vertebrate Paleontology. 29 (1): 286–290. Bibcode:2009JVPal..29..286M. doi:10.1080/02724634.2009.10010382. S2CID 196608646.
- Williamson, T. E.; Carr, T. D.; Williams, S. A.; Tremaine, K. (2009). "Early ontogeny of pachycephalosaurine squamosals as revealed by juvenile specimens from the Hell Creek Formation, eastern Montana". Journal of Vertebrate Paleontology. 29 (1): 291–294. Bibcode:2009JVPal..29..291W. doi:10.1671/039.029.0111. S2CID 84516840.
- Bittencourt, J.S.; Kellner, A.W.A. (2009). "The anatomy and phylogenetic position of the Triassic dinosaur Staurikosaurus pricei Colbert, 1970". Zootaxa. 2079: 1–56. doi:10.11646/zootaxa.2079.1.1. S2CID 90574494.
- Chin, K.; Hartman, J.H.; Roth, B. (2009). "Opportunistic exploitation of dinosaur dung: fossil snails in coprolites from the Upper Cretaceous Two Medicine Formation of Montana". Lethaia. 42 (2): 185–198. Bibcode:2009Letha..42..185C. doi:10.1111/j.1502-3931.2008.00131.x.
- Maidment, S.C.R.; Porro, L.B. (2009). "Homology of the palpebral and origin of supraorbital ossifications in ornithischian dinosaurs". Lethaia. 43: 95–111. doi:10.1111/j.1502-3931.2009.00172.x.
- Gates, T.A.; Farke, A.A. (2009). "Biostratigraphic and biogeographic implications of a hadrosaurid (Ornithopoda: Dinosauria) from the Upper Cretaceous Almond Formation of Wyoming, USA". Cretaceous Research. 30 (5): 1157–1163. Bibcode:2009CrRes..30.1157G. doi:10.1016/j.cretres.2009.05.001.
- Moratalla, J.J.; Hernán, J. (2008). "Los Cayos S y D: dos afloramientos con icnitas de saurópodos, terópodos y ornitópodos en el Cretácico Inferior del área de Los Cayos (Cornago, La Rioja, España)". Estudios Geológicos. 64 (2): 161–173. doi:10.3989/egeol.08642.043.
- Taylor, M.P.; Wedel, M.J.; Naish, D. (2009). "Head and neck posture in sauropod dinosaurs inferred from extant animals". Acta Palaeontologica Polonica. 54 (2): 213–220. doi:10.4202/app.2009.0007. S2CID 7582320.

=== Hadrosaur chewing study ===
A study titled "Quantitative analysis of dental microwear in hadrosaurid dinosaurs, and the implications for hypotheses of jaw mechanics and feeding" is published by British paleontologists Mark Purnell, Paul Barrett and student Vince Williams. The paper examined the chewing methods and diet of hadrosaurid ("duck billed") dinosaurs from the Late Cretaceous period. The scientists analyzed hundreds of microscopic scratches on the teeth of a fossilized Edmontosaurus jaw, and believe they determined exactly how a hadrosaur broke down and ate its food, which had previously eluded researchers.

The study found hadrosaurs had a unique way of eating unlike any creature living today. In contrast to a flexible lower jaw joint prevalent in today's mammals, hadrosaurs had a unique hinge between the upper jaws and the rest of its skull. The team found the dinosaur's upper jaws pushed outwards and sideways while chewing, as the lower jaw slid against the upper teeth.

The study also concluded that hadrosaurs likely grazed on horsetails and vegetation close to the ground, rather than browsing higher-growing leaves and twigs. However, Purnell said these conclusions were less secure than the more conclusive evidence regarding the motion of teeth while chewing. Previous studies found contradictory conclusions, and the issue remains a subject of debate.

The findings were published on June 30, 2009, in the journal, The Proceedings of the National Academy of Sciences. Purnell said no previous study had ever employed this method of analyzing microscopic teeth scratches, and that the method could be used to study other areas of scientific research.

=== New taxa ===
Data courtesy of George Olshevky's dinosaur genera list. ~44 dinosaur genera were erected in 2009.

Name	Status	Authors	Discovery year	Age	Unit	Location	Notes	Images
Adeopapposaurus	Valid	Ricardo N. Martínez			Cañón del Colorado Formation	Argentina		Adeopapposaurus
Aerosteon	Valid	Sereno; R. N. Martinez; et al. (Note: Sereno, R. N. Martinez, J. A. Wilson, Varricchio, Alcober.)			Rio Colorado Formation	Argentina		Aerosteon
Albalophosaurus	Valid	Ohashi; Barrett			Kuwajima Formation	Japan		
Albertonykus	Valid	Longrich; Currie		lower Maastrichtian	Horseshoe Canyon Formation	Canada (Alberta)		Albertonykus
Anchiornis	Valid	Xu X.; Zhao Q.; et al. (Note: Xu X., Zhao Q., Norell, C. Sullivan, Hone, Erickson, Wang X. L., Han F., Guo.)			Tiaojishan Formation	China		Anchiornis
Angulomastacator	Valid	J. R. Wagner; Lehman			Aguja Formation	US (Texas)		
Arenysaurus	Valid	Xabier Pereda-Suberbiolaa; José Ignacio Canudob; et al. (Note: Xabier Pereda-Suberbiolaa, José Ignacio Canudob, Penélope Cruzado-Caballerob, José Luis Barcoc, Nieves López-Martínezd, Oriol Omse, José Ignacio Ruiz-Omeñaca.)				Spain	A Spanish Lambeosaurine.	
Australovenator	Valid	Hocknull; White; et al. (Note: Hocknull, White, Tischler, Cook, Calleja, Sloan, Elliott.)			Winton Formation	Australia	An Australian Megaraptor. Specimen named "Banjo"	Australovenator
Baotianmansaurus	Valid	Zhang, X.; Lü, J.; et al. (Note: Zhang, X., Lü, J., Xu, L., Li, J., Yang, L.K., Hu, W., Jia, S., Ji, Q. Zhang, C.)			Gaogou Formation	China		
Barrosasaurus	Valid	Salgado; Coria			Anacleto Formation	Argentina		
Ceratonykus	Valid	Alifanov; Barsbold			Barun Goyot Formation	Mongolia		Ceratonykus
Diamantinasaurus	Valid	Hocknull; White; et al.			Winton Formation	Australia	An Australian Titanosaur.	Diamantinasaurus
Elrhazosaurus	Valid	Galton			Elrhaz Formation	Niger		
Helioceratops	Valid	Jin; Chen; et al. (Note: Jin, Chen, Zan, Godefroit.)			Quantou Formation	China		Helioceratops
Hesperonychus	Valid	Longrich; Currie			Dinosaur Park Formation	Canada	Smallest known dinosaur from North America.	Hesperonychus
Jintasaurus	Valid	You; Li			Xinminpu Group	China		
Kinnareemimus	Valid	Buffetaut; Suteethorn; Tong			Sao Khua Formation	Thailand		
Kol	Valid	Turner; Nesbitt; Norell			Djadochta Formation	Mongolia		Kol
Leshansaurus	Valid	Li; Peng; et al. (Note: Li, Peng, Jiang, Huang.)			Shangshaximiao Formation	China		
Levnesovia	Valid	Sues; Averianov			Bissekty Formation	Uzbekistan	The oldest Hadrosauroidean	
Limusaurus	Valid	Xu			Shishugou Formation	China	The first Asian ceratosaur to be discovered	Limusaurus
Luoyanggia	Valid	Lü; Xu; et al. (Note: Lü, Xu, Jiang, Jia, Li, Yuan, Zhang, Ji.)			Haoling Formation	China	An oviraptorosaur	
Malarguesaurus	Valid	González Riga; Previtera; Pirrone			Portezuelo Formation	Argentina		
Minotaurasaurus	Valid	Clifford A. Miles; Clark J. Mikes				Mongolia		Minotaurasaurus
Miragaia	Valid	Mateus; Maidment; Christiansen			Sobral Unit	Portugal	Long-necked stegosaur.	Miragaia
Nothronychus graffami	Valid	Zanno et al.'			Tropic Shale Formation	US	A therizinosaurid.	Nothronychus graffami
Owenodon	Valid	Galton			Purbeck Limestone	UK		Owenodon
Panphagia	Valid	Martinez; Alcober			Ischigualasto Formation	Argentina	One of the most basal known sauropodomorph.	Panphagia
Qiaowanlong	Valid	You; Li			Xinminpu Group	China		Qiaowanlong
Raptorex		Sereno; Brusatte; et al. (Note: Sereno, Brusatte, Kriegstein, Zhao, Cloward.)			Yixian Formation	China	Tyrannosauroidea	Raptorex
Ruyangosaurus	Valid	Lu; Xu; et al. (Note: Lu, Xu, Jia, Zhang, Zhang, Yang, You, Ji.)			Haoling Formation	China		Ruyangosaurus
Shaochilong	Valid	Brusatte; Benson; et al. (Note: Brusatte, Benson, Chure, Xu, Sullivan, Hone.)			Miaogou Formation	China		Shaochilong
Shidaisaurus	Valid	Wu; Currie; et al. (Note: Wu, Currie, Dong, Pan, Tang.)			Chuanjie Formation	China		
Sinotyrannus	Valid	Ji; Ji; Zhang			Jiufotang Formation	China		
Skorpiovenator	Valid	Canale; Scanferla; et al. (Note: Canale, Scanferla, Agnolin, Novas.)			Huincul Formation	Argentina		Skorpiovenator
Spinophorosaurus		Remes; Ortega; et al. (Note: Remes, Ortega, Fierro, Joger, Kosma, Ferrer.)			Irhazer Group	Niger	Sauropoda	Spinophorosaurus
Tatankacephalus	Valid	Parsons; Parsons			Cloverly Formation	US (Montana)		
Tawa	Valid	Nesbitt; Smith; et al. (Note: Nesbitt, Smith, Irmis, Turner, Downs, Norell.)			Chinle Formation	US (New Mexico)		Tawa
Tethyshadros	Valid	Dalla Vecchia			Lipica Formation	Italy		
Tianyulong	Valid	Zheng; You; et al. (Note: Zheng, You, Xu, Dong.)			Tiaojishan Formation	China		Tianyulong
Wintonotitan	Valid	Hocknull; White; et al.			Winton Formation	Australia		Wintonotitan
Xianshanosaurus	Valid	Lü; Xu; et al.			Haoling Formation	China	A sauropod	
"Xinghesaurus"	Nomen nudum	Hasegawa; Carpenter; et al. (Note: Hasegawa, Carpenter, Lamanna, Xu.)					Name published without scientific description in Japanese guidebook "Dinosaur Expo 2009: The Miracle of Deserts"	
Zanabazar	Valid	Norell; Makovicky; et al. (Note: Norell, Makovicky, Bever, Balanoff, Clark, Barsbold, Rowe.)			Nemegt Formation	1. Mongolia		Zanabazar

=== Aves ===
==== Research ====
- Anfinson, O.A.; Lockley, M.G.; Kim, S.H.; Kim, K.S.; Kim, J.Y. (2009). "First report of the small bird track Koreanaornis from the Cretaceous of North America: implications for avian ichnotaxonomy and paleoecology" (PDF). Cretaceous Research. 30 (4): 885–894. Bibcode:2009CrRes..30..885A. doi:10.1016/j.cretres.2009.02.001.
- Lockley, M.; Chin, K.; Houck, K.; Matsukawa, M.; Kukihara, R. (2009). "New interpretations of Ignotornis, the first-reported Mesozoic avian footprints: implications for the paleoecology and behavior of an enigmatic Cretaceous bird" (PDF). Cretaceous Research. 30 (4): 1041–1061. Bibcode:2009CrRes..30.1041L. doi:10.1016/j.cretres.2009.04.001.
- Bell, A.; Everhart, M.J. (2009). "A new specimen of Parahesperornis (Aves: Hesperornithiformes) from the Smoky Hill Chalk (Early Campanian) of western Kansas". Transactions of the Kansas Academy of Science. 112 (1/2): 7–14. doi:10.1660/062.112.0202. S2CID 86083098.

==== Newly described birds ====
Name	Novelty	Status	Authors	Age	Unit	Location	Notes	Images
Alamitornis minutus	Gen. nov. et Sp. nov.	Valid	Federico L. Agnolin Agustín G. Martinelli	Late Cretaceous	Los Alamitos Formation	Argentina	Placed in ?Patagopterygiformes by Agnolin and Martinelli.	
Australotadorna alecwilsoni	Gen. nov. et Sp. nov.	Valid	Trevor H. Worthy	Late Oligocene	Etadunna Formation	Australia	An Anatidae.	
Bonasa nini	Sp. nov.	Valid	Antonio Sánchez Marco	Early Pleistocene	Lower Elefante, TE 13 layer	Spain	A Phasianidae.	
Calidris janossyi	Sp. nov.	Valid	Jenö Kessler	Late Miocene	MN 13	Hungary	Originally described as a member of Scolopacidae belonging to the genus Calidris; Zelenkov, Volkova and Gorobets (2016) reinterpreted it as a member of Turnicidae and transferred it to the genus Ortyxelos.	
Calonectris kurodai	Sp. nov.	Valid	Storrs L. Olson	Middle Miocene	Calvert Formation	US (Virginia)	A Procellariidae, the smallest of the genus.	
Cariama santacrucensis	Sp. nov.	Disputed	Jorge I. Noriega Sergio F. Vizcaino Susana Bargo	Early-Middle Miocene	Estancia La Costa Member, Santa Cruz Formation	Argentina	Federico L. Agnolin, 2009, made it the type species of the separate genus Noriegavis Agnolin, 2009. Originally interpreted as a seriema; Noriega & Mayr (2017) reinterpreted it as a member of the falconid genus Thegornis of uncertain specific assignment, on the basis of a reexamination of the holotype specimen.	
Charadrius lambrechti.	Sp. nov.	Valid	Jenö Kessler	Late Miocene	MN 13	Hungary	A Scolopacidae.	
Clangula matraensis	Sp. nov.	Valid	Jenö Kessler	Middle Miocene	MN 6–8	Hungary	An Anatidae.	
Confuciusornis feducciai	Sp. nov.	Disputed	Zuhui Zhang Chunling Gao Qingjin Meng Jinyuan Liu Lianhai Hou Guangmei Zheng	Early Cretaceous	Yixian Formation	China	A member of the family Confuciusornithidae. Considered to be a junior synonym of Confuciusornis sanctus by Wang, O'Connor & Zhou (2018).	
Cygnopterus neogradiensis	Sp. nov.	Valid	Jenö Kessler János Hír	Middle Miocene	Sajóvölgy Formation, MN 7–8	Hungary	An Anatidae.	
Diomedeoides harmati	Sp. nov.	Valid	Jenö Kessler	Early Oligocene	MP 24	Hungary	A Diomedeoididae Fischer, 1985, placed in Rupelornis van Beneden, 1871 by Gerald Mayr and Thierry Smith, 2012	
Egretta polgardiensis	Sp. nov.	Disputed	Jenö Kessler	Late Miocene	MN 13	Hungary	Originally described as a member of Ardeidae and a species of Egretta; however, Zelenkov (2017) considered this species to be a junior synonym of the barn-owl species Tyto campiterrae Jánossy (1991).	
Elbretornis bonapartei	Gen. nov. et Sp. nov.	Valid	Cyril A. Walker Gareth J. Dyke	Maastrichtian	Lecho Formation	Argentina	An Enantiornithes Walker, 1981, Euenantiornithes Chiappe, 2002, this is the type species of the new genus.	
Eoanseranas handae	Gen. nov. et Sp. nov.	Valid	Trevor H. Worthy John D. Scanlon	Late Oligocene – Early Miocene	Riverleigh World Heritage Property	Australia	An Anseranatidae, this is the type species of the new genus.	
Gansugyps linxiaensis	Gen. nov. et Sp. nov.	Valid	Zhang Zihui Zheng Xiaoting Zheng Guangmei Hou Lianhai	Late Miocene	Upper Liushu Formation	China	An Accipitridae, this is the type species of the new genus.	
Heliadornis minor	Sp. nov.	Valid	Jenö Kessler	Late Pliocene	MN 15–16	Slovakia	A Phaethontidae.	
Heliornis sumeghensis	Sp. nov.	Valid	Jenö Kessler	Late Miocene	MN 11–12	Hungary	A Heliornithidae	
Jianchangornis microdonta	Gen. nov. et Sp. nov.	Valid	Zhou Zhonghe Zhang Fucheng Li Zhiheng	Early Cretaceous Albian	Jiufotang Formation	China	A basal Ornithurae Haeckel, 1866, this is the type species of the new genus.	
Martinavis minor	Sp. nov.	Valid	Cyril A. Walker Gareth J. Dyke	Late Cretaceous Maastrichtian	Lecho Formation	Argentina	An Enantiornithes Walker, 1981, Euenantiornithes Chiappe, 2002.	
Martinavis saltariensis	Sp. nov.	Valid	Cyril A. Walker Gareth J. Dyke	Late Cretaceous Maastrichtian	Lecho Formation	Argentina	An Enantiornithes Walker, 1981, Euenantiornithes Chiappe, 2002.	
Martinavis whetstonei	Sp. nov.	Valid	Cyril A. Walker Gareth J. Dyke	Late Cretaceous Maastrichtian	Lecho Formation	Argentina	An Enantiornithes Walker, 1981, Euenantiornithes Chiappe, 2002.	
Megalocoturnix cordoni	Gen. nov. et Sp. nov.	Valid	Antonio Sánchez Marco	Early Pliocene	Ruscinian, MN 15	Spain	A Phasianidae, this is the type species of the new genus.	
Megapaloelodus peiranoi	Sp. nov.	Valid	Federico L. Agnolin	Late Miocene	Andalhualá Formation	Argentina	A Phoenicopteriformes, Palaelodidae Stejneger, 1885.	
Mergus minor	Sp. nov.	Valid	Jenö Kessler	Middle Miocene	MN 6–8	Hungary	An Anatidae.	
Miocepphus blowi	Gen. nov. et Sp. nov.	Valid	Erik Wijnker Storrs L. Olson	Late Miocene	Eastover Formation; Breda Formation Mill	US (Virginia); Netherlands	An Alcidae.	
Miocepphus bohaskai	Sp. nov.	Valid	Erik Wijnker Storrs L. Olson	Late Miocene	Eastover Formation; Breda Formation Mill	US (Maryland and Virginia); Netherlands	An Alcidae.	
Miocepphus mergulellus	Sp. nov.	Valid	Erik Wijnker Storrs L. Olson	Late Miocene	Eastover Formation	US (North Carolina)	An Alcidae.	
''Palaeocryptonyx nov''aki	Sp. nov.	Valid	Antonio Sánchez Marco	Late Pliocene	Villanyan, MN 16	Spain	A Phasianidae.	
Paracoracias occidentalis	Gen. nov. et Sp. nov.	Valid	Julia A. Clarke Daniel T. Ksepka N. Adam Smith Mark A. Norell	Eocene	Green River Formation	US (Wyoming)	A stem Coraiiformes.	
Pinpanetta fromensis	Sp. nov.	Valid	Trevor H. Worthy	Late Oligocene	Etadunna Formation	Australia	An Anatidae.	
Pinpanetta tedfordi	Gen. nov. et Sp. nov.	Valid	Trevor H. Worthy	Late Oligocene	Etadunna Formation	Australia	An Anatidae, this is the type species of the new genus.	
Pinpanetta vickersrichae	Sp. nov.	Valid	Trevor H. Worthy	Late Oligocene	Etadunna Formation	Australia	An Anatidae.	
Podiceps csarnotatus	Sp. nov.	Valid	Jenö Kessler	Late Pliocene	MN 15-16	Hungary	A Podicipedidae.	
Porzana kretzoii	Sp. nov.	Valid	Jenö Kessler	Late Miocene	MN 13	Hungary	A member of the family Rallidae. Originally described as a species Porzana; Zelenkov (2017) transferred this species to the genus Zapornia.	
Porzana matraensis	Sp. nov.	Valid	Jenö Kessler	Middle Miocene	MN 6-8	Hungary	A Rallidae.	
Primozygodactylus eunjooae	Sp. nov.	Valid	Gerald Mayr Nikita V. Zelenkov	Middle Eocene	MP 11	Germany	A Zygodactylidae Brodkorb, 1971.	
Pseudocepphus teres	Gen. nov. et Sp. nov.	Valid	Erik Wijnker Storrs L. Olson	Late Miocene	St. Marys Formation	US (Maryland)	An Alcidae, this is the type species of the new genus.	
Rapaxavis pani	Gen. nov. et Sp. nov.	Valid	Eric M. Morschhauser David J. Varricchio Gao Chunling Liu Jinyuan Wang Xuri Cheng Xiadong Meng Qingjin	Early Cretaceous	Jiufotang Formation	China	An Enantiornithes Walker, 1981, Longipterygidae Zhang, Zhou, Hou et Gu, 2000, this is the type species of the new genus.	
Rupephaps taketake	Gen. nov. et Sp. nov.	Valid	Trevor H. Worthy Suzanne J. Hand Jennifer P. Worthy Alan J. D. Tennyson R. Paul Scofield	Early Miocene, Altonian	Bannockburn Formation	New Zealand	A Columbidae, this is the type species of the new genus.	
Sapeornis angustis	Sp. nov.	Valid	Pauline Provini Zhou Zhonghe Zhang Fucheng	Early Cretaceous, Aptian	Jiufotang Formation	China	A Sapeornithidae Zhou et Zhang, 2006.	
Selenornis steendorpensis	Sp. nov.	Valid	Gerald Mayr	Early Oligocene, MP ?23-24	Boom Formation	Belgium	A Tytonidae, Selenornithinae Mourer-Chauviré, 1987.	
Shanweiniao cooperorum	Gen. nov. et Sp. nov.	Valid	Jingmai K. O'Connor Xuri Wang Luis M. Chiappe Chunling Gao Qingjin Meng Xiaodong Cheng Jinyuan Liu	Early Cretaceous	Yixian Formation	China	An Enantiornithes Walker, 1981, Familia Longipterygidae Zhang, Zhou, Hou et Gu, 2000, this is the type species of the new genus.	Shanweiniao cooperorum
Talpanas lippa	Gen. nov. et Sp. nov.	Valid	Storrs L. Olson Helen F. James	Holocene	Kauai	US (Hawaii)	An Anatidae, Kaua'i Mole Duck, a Hawaiian duck that probably lived a kiwi-like lifestyle, this is the type species of the new genus.	
Tologuica aurorae	Gen. nov. et Sp. nov.	Valid	Nikita V. Zelenkov Evgeny N. Kurochkin	Middle Miocene	Ööshin Formation	Mongolia	A Phasianidae, this is the type species of the new genus.	
Tologuica karhui	Sp. nov.	Valid	Nikita V. Zelenkov Evgeny N. Kurochkin	Middle Miocene	Ööshin Formation	Mongolia	A Phasianidae.	

=== Pterosaurs ===
- Lü, J. (2009). "A new non-pterodactyloid pterosaur from Qinglong County, Hebei Province of China". Acta Geologica Sinica (English Edition). 83 (2): 189–199. Bibcode:2009AcGlS..83..189L. doi:10.1111/j.1755-6724.2009.00062.x. S2CID 247739978.
- Vullo, R.; Neraudeau, D. (2009). "Pterosaur remains from the Cenomanian (Late Cretaceous) Paralic Deposits of Charentes, Western France". Journal of Vertebrate Paleontology. 29 (1): 277–282. Bibcode:2009JVPal..29..277V. doi:10.1080/02724634.2009.10010380. S2CID 197536660.

Newly named pterosaurs
Name	Status	Authors	Age	Unit	Location	Notes	Images
Carniadactylus	Valid	Dalla Vecchia	Late Triassic		Italy	A campylognathoidid with a wingspan of about 70 cm.	
Changchengopterus	Valid	Lü	Middle Jurassic	Tiaojishan Formation	China	A primitive long-tailed pterosaur related to Dorygnathus.	
Ningchengopterus	Valid	Lü	Early Cretaceous	Yixian Formation	China	A pterodactyloid known from a juvenile specimen whose fossils preserved details of the flight membrane and fur.	Ningchengopterus.
Wukongopterus	Valid	Wang; Kellner; Jiang; Meng	Late Jurassic	Daohugou Beds	China	A primitive long tailed pterosaur. The type specimen shows evidence of the animal having broken its shin while alive.	Wukongopterus

== See also ==
- 2010 in archosaur paleontology
- 2011 in archosaur paleontology
- 2012 in archosaur paleontology
- 2013 in archosaur paleontology
