= 1993 in paleontology =

Paleontology or palaeontology is the study of prehistoric life forms on Earth through the examination of plant and animal fossils. This includes the study of body fossils, tracks (ichnites), burrows, cast-off parts, fossilised feces (coprolites), palynomorphs and chemical residues. Because humans have encountered fossils for millennia, paleontology has a long history both before and after becoming formalized as a science. This article records significant discoveries and events related to paleontology that occurred or were published in the year 1993.

== Flora ==
=== Plants ===
Name	Novelty	Status	Authors	Age	Unit	Location	Notes	Images
Araucarioxylon hoodii	Sp nov	jr synonym	(Tidwell & Medlyn) Gee et al	Late Jurassic	Morrison Formation	USA; Utah	An araucariaceous petrified wood. Moved to Agathoxylon hoodii (2019)	

== Arthropods ==
=== Insects ===
Name	Novelty	Status	Authors	Age	Unit	Location	Notes	Images
Lixus (Eulixus) balazuci	Gen et sp nov	Valid	Voisin & Nel	Turolian		France	A Curculionid weevil	Lixus (Eulixus) balazuci
Mesoepiophlebia veronicae	Gen et sp nov	Valid	Nel & Henrotay	Toarcian	Bascharage	Luxembourg	A sphenophlebiid dragonfly. Type species M. veronicae	Mesoepiophlebia veronicae
Miofibla	Gen et sp nov	jr synonym	Nel	Late Miocene		Spain	An inocellid snakefly, moved to Fibla (Reisserella) cerdanica in 2002	Fibla cerdanica
Ohmella coffini	Sp nov	Valid	Nel	Turolian	Montagne d'Andance	France	A snakefly	Ohmella coffini
Paraplagiophlebia	Gen et sp nov	Valid	Nel & Henrotay	Toarcian	Bascharage	Luxembourg	A Myopophlebiid dragonfly, type species P. marcusi	Paraheterophlebia marcusi
Paraoligolestes	Gen et sp nov	Valid	Nel & Escuillé	Turolian		France	A Sieblosiid damselfly, type species P. miocenicus	Paraoligolestes miocenicus
Paraplagiophlebia	Gen et sp nov	Valid	Nel & Henrotay	Toarcian	Bascharage	Luxembourg	A Myopophlebiid dragonfly, type species P. loneuxi	Paraplagiophlebia loneuxi

== Archosauromorphs ==
=== Pseudosuchians ===
Name	Novelty	Status	Authors	Age	Unit	Location	Notes	Images
Shuvosaurus		Valid taxon	Chatterjee	Late Triassic (mid Norian)	Cooper Canyon Formation	United States (Texas)	A shuvosaurid.	Shuvosaurus

=== Non-avian dinosaurs ===
Data courtesy of George Olshevsky's dinosaur genera list.

Name	Status	Authors		Location	Notes	Images
Anasazisaurus	Valid taxon	Hunt	S. G. Lucas	United States (New Mexico)		
Argentinosaurus	Valid taxon	Jose Bonaparte	Rodolfo Coria	Argentina	A sauropod of 75 to 100 tons and 35 meters in length.	Argentinosaurus
"Elvisaurus"	nomen nudum later named Cryolophosaurus	Holmes				
Eoraptor	Valid taxon	Paul Sereno; Catherine Forster	Rogers; Monetta	Argentina	A primitive saurischian.	Eoraptor
Iuticosaurus	Valid taxon	Le Loeuff				
Klamelisaurus	Valid taxon	Zhao X.		China		
Malawisaurus	Valid taxon	Jacobs; Winkler	W. R. Downs; Gomani,	Malawi	A Sauropod dinosaur from Malawi.	Malawisaurus
"Mononychus"	Preoccupied name, later respelled Mononykus	Perle; Mark Norell	Luis M. Chiappe; Clark, /Schueppel			
Mononykus	Valid taxon	Perle; Mark Norell	Luis M. Chiappe; Clark	Mongolia	A small Mongolian alvaresaur.	Mononykus was originally spelled "Mononychus."
Naashoibitosaurus	Valid taxon	Hunt	S. G. Lucas,	United States (New Mexico)		
Pararhabdodon	Valid taxon	Casanovas-Cladellas; Santafé-Llopis	Isidro-Llorens	Spain	A Spanish Tsintaosaurin Hadrosaur.	
Tianchisaurus	Valid taxon	Dong Zhiming		China		
Tsagantegia	Valid taxon	Tumanova		Mongolia		
Utahraptor	Valid taxon	James Kirkland; Burge	Gaston	United States (Utah)	A bear-size Dromaeosaur.	Utahraptor with a human to scale.

=== Birds ===
Name	Status	Novelty	Authors	Age	Unit	Location	Notes	Images
Archaeopteryx bavarica	Valid ?	Sp. nov.	Peter Wellnhofer	Late Jura	Portlandian, Solnhofer Plattenkalk	Germany	An Archaopterygidae, the 7th Archaeopteryx specimen (Solnhofer Aktien-Verein specimen). Often seen as synonymous with Archaeopteryx lithographica von Meyer, 1861.	
Chaoyangia beishanensis	Valid	Gen. nov. et Sp. nov.	Hou Lianhai Zhang Jiangyong	Early Cretaceous	Valanginian, Jiufotang Formation	China	An Ornithurae, Chaoyangiiformes Hou, 1997, Chaoyangiidae Hou, 1997.	
Corvus fangshannus	Valid	Sp. nov.	Hou Lianhai	Pleistocene	Cave deposits	China	A Corvidae.	
Coturnix gomerae	Valid	Sp. nov.	Damià Jaume Miguel McMinn Josep A. Alcover	Late Pleistocene	Cave deposits	Spain	A Phasianidae.	
Coua berthae	Valid	Sp. nov.	Steven M. Goodman Florent Ravoavy	Holocene	Cave deposits	Madagascar	A Cuculidae.	
Enantiornis martini	Valid	Sp. nov.	Lev A. Nessov Andrei V. Panteleyev	Late Cretaceous	Coniacian, Bissekty Formation	Uzbekistan	An Enantiornithidae, transferred to the New genus Incolornis Panteleyev, 1998 by Panteleyev, 1998	
Enantiornis walkeri	Valid	Sp. nov.	Lev A. Nessov Andrei V. Panteleyev	Late Cretaceous	Coniacian, Bissekty Formation	Uzbekistan	An Enantiornithidae, transferred to the New genus Explorornis Panteleyev, 1998 by Panteleyev	
Gallus moldovicus	1993, In press.	Sp. nov.	Nikolay I. Burchak-Abramovich I. M. Ganea K. I. Shushpanov	Late Pliocene	Tchichmiknoia	Moldova	Mentioned in the SAPE Information Letter, 1993 and in Mlíkovský, 2002. .	
Hesperornis rossicus	Valid	Sp. nov.	Lev A. Nessov A. A. Yarkov	Late Cretaceous	Late Campanian	Kazakhstan	A Hesperornithiformes Fürbringer, 1888, Hesperornithidae Marsh, 1872.	
Lectavis bretincola	Valid	Gen. nov. et Sp. nov.	Luis M. Chiappe	Late Cretaceous	Maastrichtian, Lecho Formation	Argentina	An Enantiornithes Walker, 1981, this is the type species of the new genus.	
Murunkus subitus	Valid	Gen. nov. et Sp. nov.	Andrei V. Panteleyev Lev A. Nessov	Middle Eocene	Central Kizylkum Desert	Uzbekistan	A Diomedeidae	
Orthonyx kaldowinyeri	Valid	Sp. nov.	Walter E. Boles	Middle-Late Miocene	Riversleigh	Australia	An Orthonychidae.	
Orthonyx wakefieldi	Valid	Sp. nov.	Robert F. Baird	Late Pleistocene	Cave deposits	Australia	An Orthonychidae.	
Pengana robertbolesi	Valid	Gen. nov. et Sp. nov.	Walter E. Boles	Late Oligocene-Early Miocene	Sticky Beak Local Fauna	Australia	An Accipitridae, this is the type species of the new genus.	
Proornis coreae	Nomen Nudum	Gen. nov. et Sp. nov.	Lin ?	Early Cretaceous	?Barremian	North Korea	A possible Confuciusornithidae, the famous "Archaopteryx of Korea", there is not a valid description of this specimen, so the name is a Nomen Nudum.	
Pycnoptilus fordi	Valid	Sp. nov.	Robert F. Baird	Late Pleistocene	Cave deposits	Australia	An Acanthizidae.	
Soroavisaurus australis	Valid	Gen. nov. et Sp. nov.	Luis M. Chiappe	Late Cretaceous	Maastrichtian, Lecho Formation	Argentina	An Enantiornithes Walker, 1981, Avisauridae Brett-Surman et Paul, 1985, this is the type species of the new genus.	
Tyto jinniushanensis	Valid	Sp. nov.	Hou LianHai	Pleistocene	Cave deposits	China	A Tytonidae.	
Yungavolucris brevipedalis	Valid	Gen. nov. et Sp. nov.	Luis M. Chiappe	Late Cretaceous	Maastrichtian, Lecho Formation	Argentina	An Enantiornithes Walker, 1981, this is the type species of the new genus.	

=== Plesiosaurs ===
Name	Novelty	Status	Authors	Age	Unit	Location	Notes	Images
Attenborosaurus		Valid	Bakker	Early Jurassic (Hettangian-Sinemurian)	Blue Lias	United Kingdom	A plesiosaurid.	Attenborosaurus
