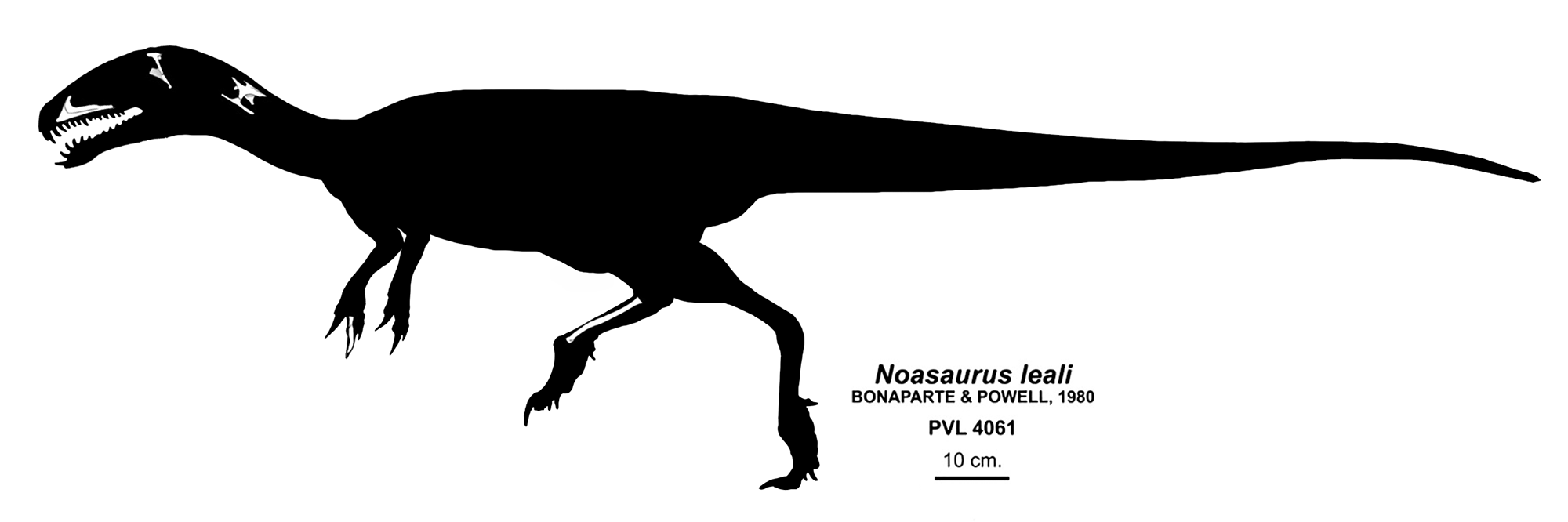
- Skeletal diagram showing known elements, save for those of unknown placement

Scientific classification
- Kingdom: Animalia
- Phylum: Chordata
- Class: Reptilia
- Clade: Dinosauria
- Clade: Saurischia
- Clade: Theropoda
- Clade: †Abelisauria
- Family: †Noasauridae
- Subfamily: †Noasaurinae
- Genus: †Noasaurus; Bonaparte & Powell, 1980
- Species: †N. leali

Binomial name
- †Noasaurus leali Bonaparte & Powell, 1980

= Noasaurus =

Noasaurus Temporal range: Late Cretaceous, 70 Ma

Extinct genus of dinosaurs

Noasaurus ("Northwestern Argentina lizard") is a genus of ceratosaurian theropod dinosaur from the Maastrichtian (Late Cretaceous) of Argentina. The type and only species is N. leali. The fragmentary holotype specimen of Noasaurus, PVL 4061, consisting of a few cranial and postcranial bones, was discovered from strata from the Lecho Formation of Southern Salta in 1975 by a team led by José Fernando Bonaparte. When described by Bonaparte and in PhD student Jaime Powell in 1980, it was believed to be a coelurosaur theropod and assigned to a family of its own; this family, Noasauridae, still exists, though has been reassigned to Ceratosauria.

Noasaurus was a fairly small theropod, with PVL 4061 measuring somewhere between 1.6–2 m (5.2–6.6 ft) in length. Initially, it was believed that two strongly curved unguals (claws) found alongside the holotype were evidence of raptorial foot claws, like those of dromaeosaurids. However, it is now known that they belonged to Noasaurus' forelimbs, and were thus functionally similar to those of spinosaurids. Therefore, rather than converging on dromaeosaurids, it may have been an opportunistic mesopredator, feeding on small vertebrates, including fish.

== Discovery and naming ==
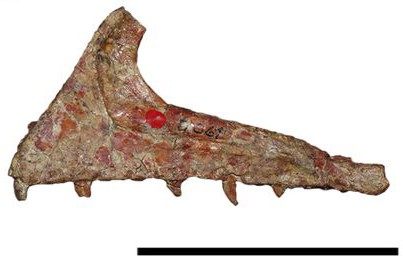
Left maxilla

During the latter half of the 20th century, a series of fossil-hunting expeditions were dispatched across to Argentina. In April 1975, an team of college students and paleontologists from the Fundación Miguel Lillo of San Miguel de Tucumán explored fossiliferous outcrops at El Brete, 2.6 km (1.6 mi) south of the El Brete Estancia, which is a fossiliferous (fossil-bearing) site that is from the middle section of the Lecho Formation. These layers derive from the Maastrichtian stage of the Late Cretaceous Period, dating to between 70 million and 68 million years old. Led by Argentine paleontologist Jose Bonaparte, the group unearthed a bonebed of disarticulated dinosaur fossils, numbering over 100 bones, from several different dinosaur taxa. These fossils were excavated from May to August 1975, though fieldwork at the site continued over the next two years. A disarticulated partial skeleton of a theropod dinosaur was discovered in 1975 or 76 by Jaime Eduardo Powell, a PhD student of Bonaparte's, among a skeleton of the titanosaur Saltasaurus. These fossils were transported to the Fundación Miguel Lillo in San Miguel de Tucumán where they was prepared and cataloged. The skeleton, cataloged under PVL 4061, contains the maxilla, the quadrate bone, two cervical (neck) vertebrae, two cervical ribs, the centrum of a back vertebra, two hand claws, a finger phalanx and the second right metatarsal bone. One of the hand claws was initially identified as a second toe claw. In 2004, it was recognised as a hand claw, at which occasion the second hand claw was referred. The tetrapod fossils of El Brete were first recorded by Boneparte et al. in 1977, including the theropod recovered which was described as belonging to a coelurosaur theropod.

The type and only known species, Noasaurus leali, was named and briefly described by Bonaparte and Powell in 1980 alongside Saltasaurus. The generic name Noasaurus begins with a usual abbreviation of noroeste Argentina, "northwest Argentina". The specific name honours the discoverer of the site, Juan Carlos Leal. The unusual nature of Noasaurus' anatomy led Bonaparte to erect the family Noasauridae, a group originally thought to be closely related to the basal coelurosaurians Coelurus and Compsognathus. Noasaurus remained poorly described and enigmatic for many years, with it only getting its brief description in 1980 and little further research, whereas its contemporary Saltasaurus and enantiornithines received full descriptions. In 1999, a cervical (neck) vertebra found at the site, specimen MACN 622, was identified as oviraptorosaurian, a rare proof that the Oviraptorosauria had invaded the Gondwanan continents. In 2007 however, it was reidentified as a noasaurid vertebra, probably belonging to the Noasaurus holotype. The decades following Noasaurus' description revealed that it was one of many noasaurid dinosaurs in the group Ceratosauria, with genera named from Madagascar, Brazil, and many other countries. In 2024, a study by an international team of researchers led by Christophe Hendrickx described the holotype of Noasaurus in further detail and evaluated its paleobiology, paleoecology, classification, and anatomy.

== Description ==
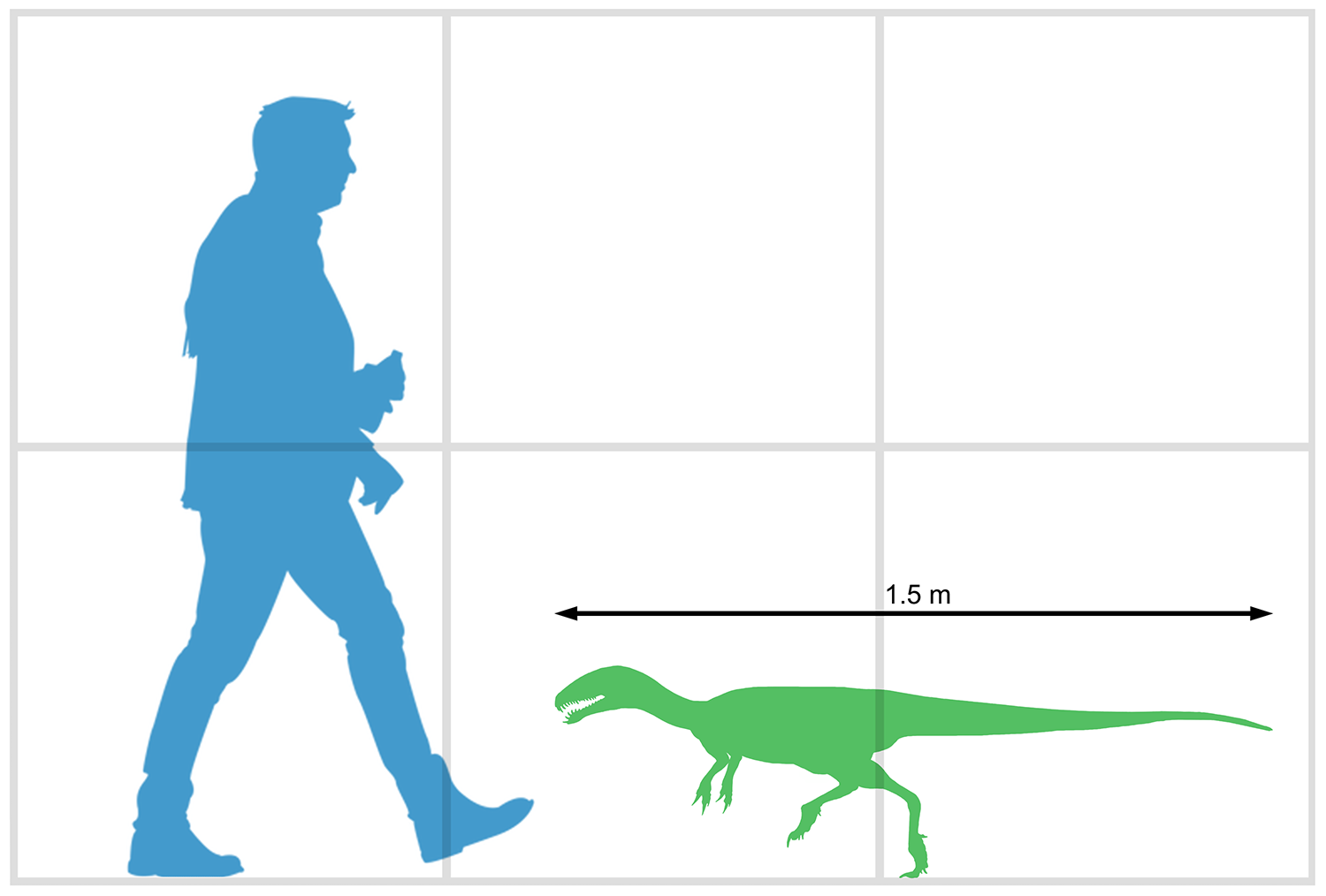
Size comparison of Noasaurus to a human

Noasaurus was a small theropod. Gregory S. Paul estimated its length at 1.5 m (4.9 ft) and its weight at 15 kg (33 lb). In 2024, Hendrickx et al. used the reconstructed size of the skull and the dimensions of the second metatarsal to provide length estimates of 1.6 m (5.2 ft) and 2 m (6.6 ft), respectively. They abstained from providing a mass estimate due to the lack of the necessary limb elements, and the possibility that the Noasaurus holotype was a juvenile. A histological analysis could not be performed on the holotype, as it was prohibited, thus its age is currently unknown.

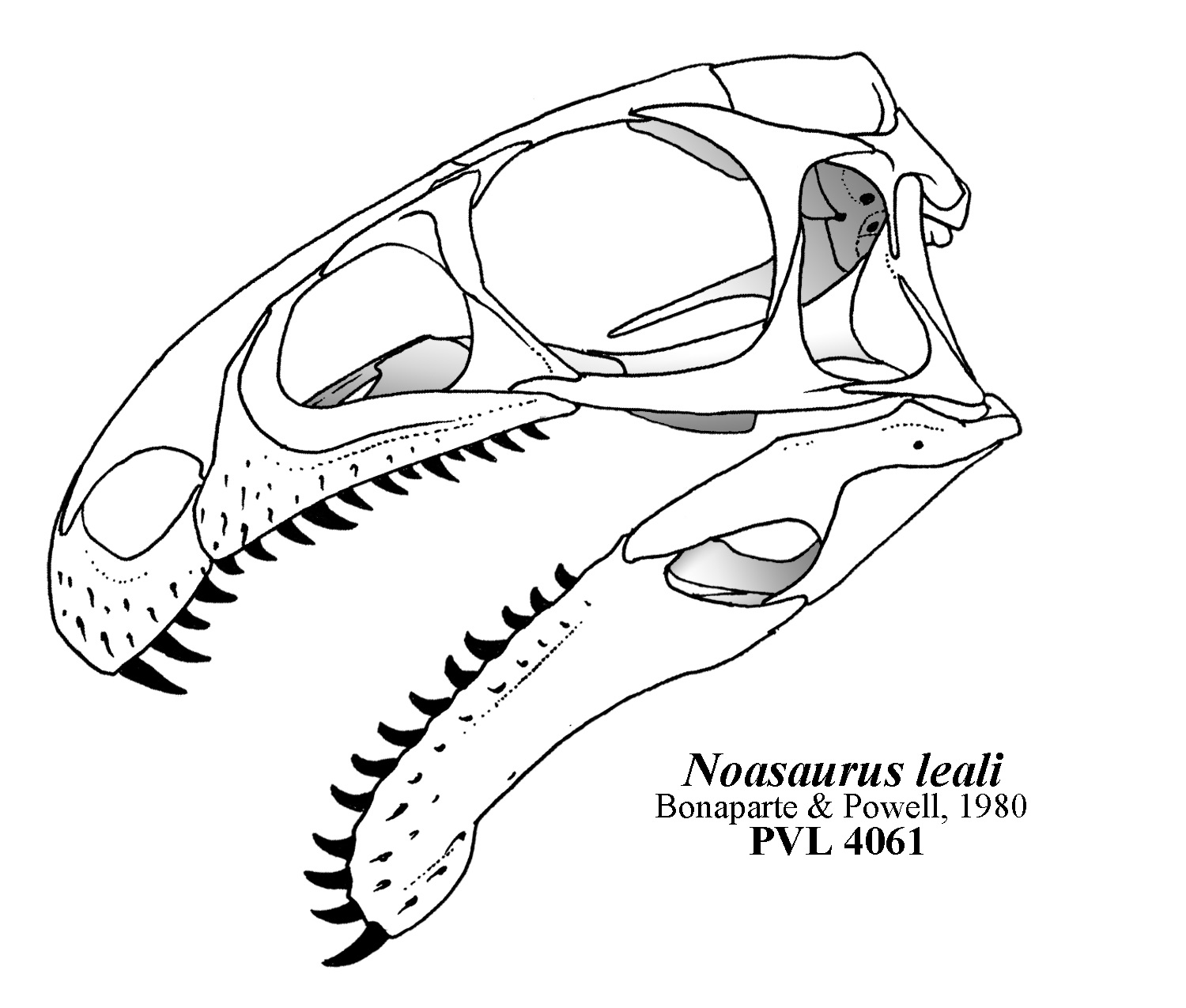
Hypothetical skull reconstruction based on Masiakasaurus

=== Skull and dentition ===
The general skull anatomy of Noasaurus is poorly known, as only two cranial elements are preserved: a left maxilla and a right quadrate, both fairly complete. The alveolar margin of the maxilla, the portion which bore teeth, was concave, and reached the apex of its concavity roughly halfway along the bone's length. Roughly sixty-seven percent of the maxillary body's length was taken up by the jugal ramus, a subtriangular, posteriorly-oriented (rearwards) projection to which the jugal bone would have articulated. At the dorsal (top) portion of the maxillary fossa was a diagonal ridge. The posterior margin of Noasaurus' quadrate, viewed laterally (from the side), is concave and parabola-shaped. The posterior margin is distinguished from that of other noasaurids by the presence of a rod-shaped quadrate ridge, running almost vertically along the medial (midline) edge of the posterior body of the bone. The pterygoid flange, to which the pterygoid bone would have articulated, is almost vertical when seen anteriorly (from the front), and is straight when viewed laterally. Its anterior margin was low.

The holotype of Noasaurus preserves five teeth, all from the left maxilla, in various states of eruption. At least eleven were present in life. Its teeth were ziphodont: they were compressed laterally (from side-to-side), recurved, and bore fine serrations on the front and rear edges, as in many other theropods. None of the preserved crowns appear to have exceeded 10 mm (0.39 in) in height.

=== Postcranial elements ===
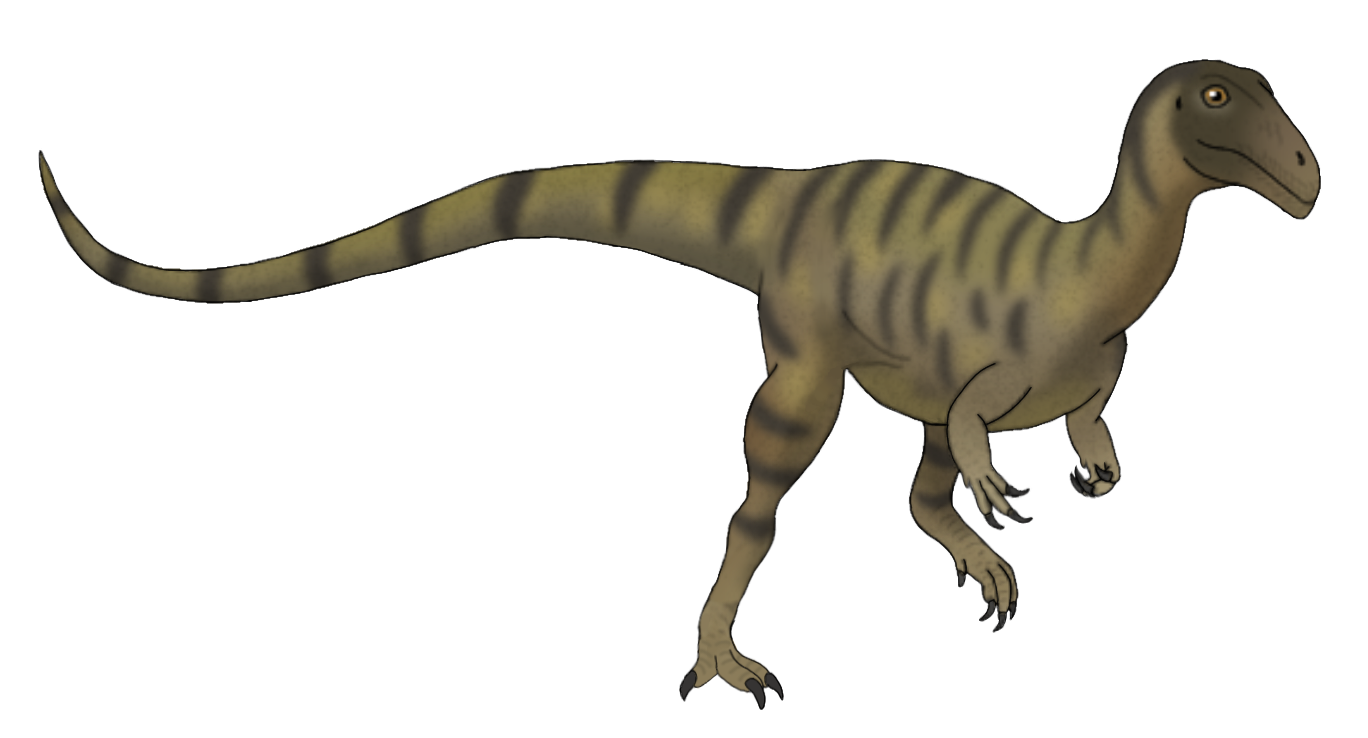
Speculative life restoration

The cervical column (neck) of Noasaurus is known from a single vertebral arch, one cervical rib from the middle of the column, and another from the posterior portion. The neural arch is almost entirely complete. Unlike other noasaurids, the epipophyses, bony projections on the sides of the cervical vertebrae, are expanded and occupy most of the arch's length. The result is that the overall neural arch appears greatly enlarged. The epipophyses were also fairly low. Similar to other noasaurids, the cervical vertebrae overall were vertically compressed, and this extends to the neural spines (which were also compressed anteroposteriorly, from front-to-back). Based on comparisons with other noasaurids and the overall elongation of the known cervical elements, it is likely that Noasaurus' neck was long and sigmoidal, meaning it bore a strong S-shaped curve.

Two unguals, phalanges which in life would have supported keratinous claws, were found in association with Noasaurus' holotype. The unguals are strongly curved and bladelike, with parallel base sides in top view, and a deep triangular cavity at the ventral (lower) portion of the base. While initially believed to be raptorial foot claws, similar to those of the unrelated dromaeosaurids, subsequent studies have demonstrated that the claws instead came from the manus (hand). Although a non-ungual phalanx is known (likely from the third digit), the overall manus anatomy of Noasaurus is uncertain, due to the strong modification of abelisauroid forelimbs in comparison to other theropods and the difficulty in ascertaining homology. When articulated, the ungual and digital phalanges are fairly immobile. The only known hind limb element is the second right metatarsal. The medial surface bears a low, elliptical bulge, likely serving as a muscle attachment point, and as the point of origin for the extensor muscles of the second digit.

== Classification ==
Noasaurus is today considered to be a member of the Ceratosauria. Originally, it was seen as a member of the Coelurosauria. Bonaparte and Powell assigned it to a family of its own, the Noasauridae. In 1988, Gregory S. Paul subsumed Noasauridae into Abelisauridae as a subfamily. He believed abelisaurids to be representatives of Megalosauria, and indicated in a cladogram that they may might have evolved from a sister to Megalosaurus. While subsequent analyses have consistently recovered noasaurids as close relatives of abelisaurids, starting with a 1991 paper by José Bonaparte, they now form a clade of their own, Abelisauroidea, within Ceratosauria.

The following cladogram is based on the phylogenetic analysis conducted by Rauhut and Carrano in 2016, showing the relationships of Elaphrosaurus among the noasaurids:

- Abelisauroidea
  - Abelisauridae
  - Noasauridae
    - Laevisuchus
    - Deltadromeus
    - - Elaphrosaurinae
        - Limusaurus
        - - CCG 20011
          - Elaphrosaurus
      - Noasaurinae
        - Velocisaurus
        - Noasaurus
        - Masiakasaurus

In 2024, Hendrickx et al.. recovered Noasaurus in a polytomy with Laevisuchus, Masiakasaurus, Velocisaurus, and Vespersaurus, likely representing a radiation of small-bodied noasaurids that occurred during the Late Cretaceous.

== Paleobiology ==
In 1980, it was thought that the presumed foot claw functioned as a sickle claw. Paul in 1988 saw the noasaurines as the South-American counterparts of the Asian and North-American dromaeosaurids, in a process of convergent evolution. Noting that abelisaurids tend to have very short arms, he wondered whether the forelimbs of Noasaurus were of limited length also, forcing the animal to employ a kicking technique instead of grasping the back of a victim in order to disembowel it with the foot claws, a method he assumed the dromaeosaurids used. This hypothesis was undermined when it was determined that the foot claw was in fact a hand claw. Instead, as proposed by Hendrickx et al.. in 2024, it may have been utilised to snag fish from the water, making it instead convergent with the enlarged thumb claw of spinosaurids like Baryonyx. They concluded that it was likely an opportunistic mesopredator that fed on small vertebrates, such as fishes. This lifestyle is similar to that proposed for Masiakasaurus.

== Palaeoenvironment ==
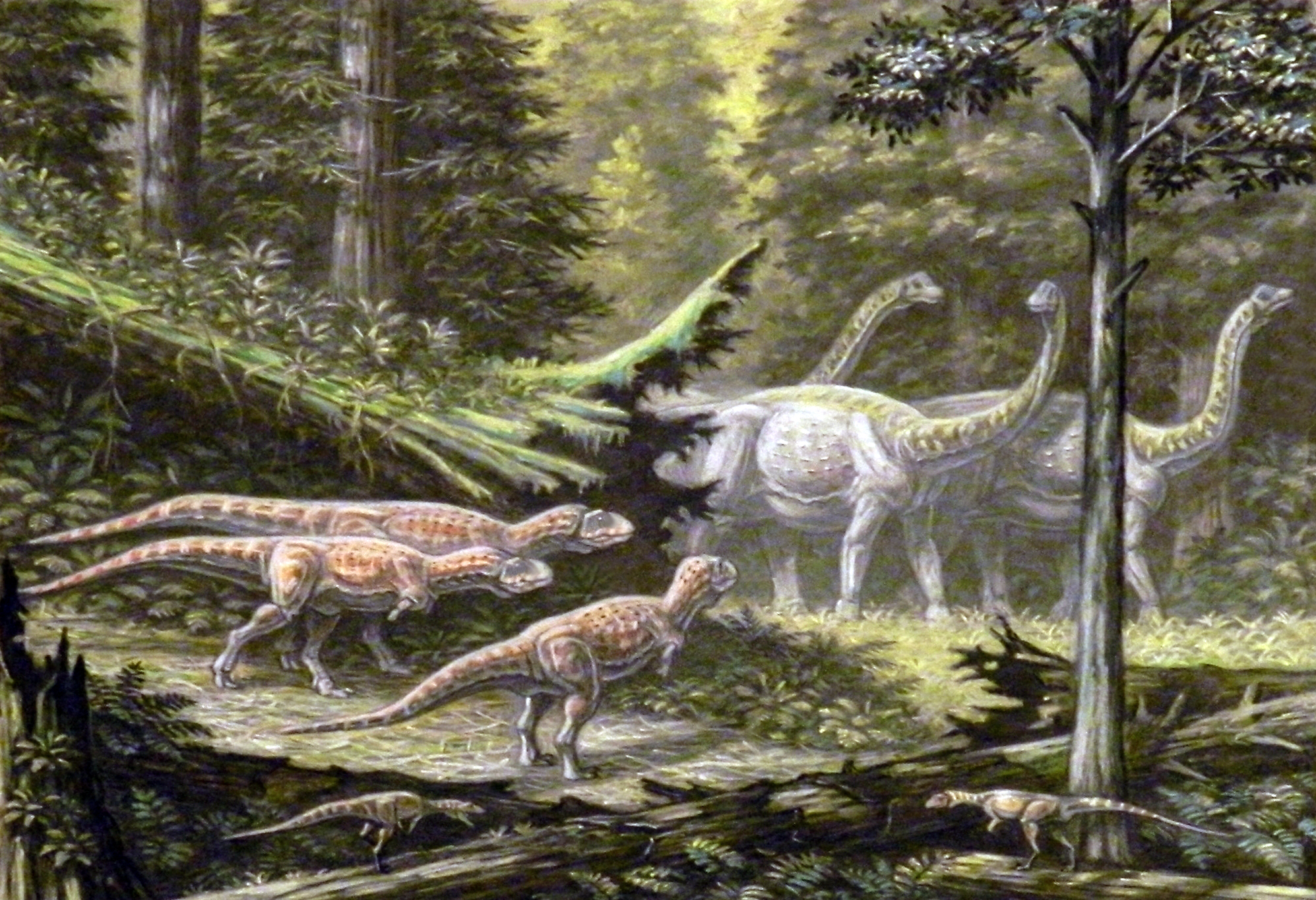
Noasaurus (foreground, small) in environment, with abelisaurids and Saltasaurus behind

The stratigraphic composition of the Lecho Formation, from which the holotype of Noasaurus is known, suggests that its depositional environment was a coastal plain, pockmarked with ponds and lagoons, which likely supported a tropical coastal forest. It was a hot, humid environment, likely close to the Tropic of Capricorn. While Noasaurus is known from the El Brete site, which does not preserve flora, the nearby Quebrada de Vilches locality indicates the presence of typical Mesozoic flora, such as the ferns Azolla and Todisporites, the conifers Classopollis and Callialasporites, the gnetophyte Ephedripites, and the angiosperms Bombacacidites, Retitrescolpites, and Rhoipites. Outside of dinosaurs (both avian and non-avian), no animal fossils are known from the Lecho Formation. The only named non-avian dinosaur from the locality, outside of Noasaurus, was the titanosaur Saltasaurus, though teeth indicate the presence of a large abelisaurid. Also known from the Lecho Formation are enantiornithine birds, in the form of Enantiornis, Lectavis, Martinavis, Soroavisaurus, and Yungavolucris.

== See also ==
- Timeline of ceratosaur research

== Sources ==
- Lessem, D. (May 1993). "Jose Bonaparte: Master of the Mesozoic". Omni.
