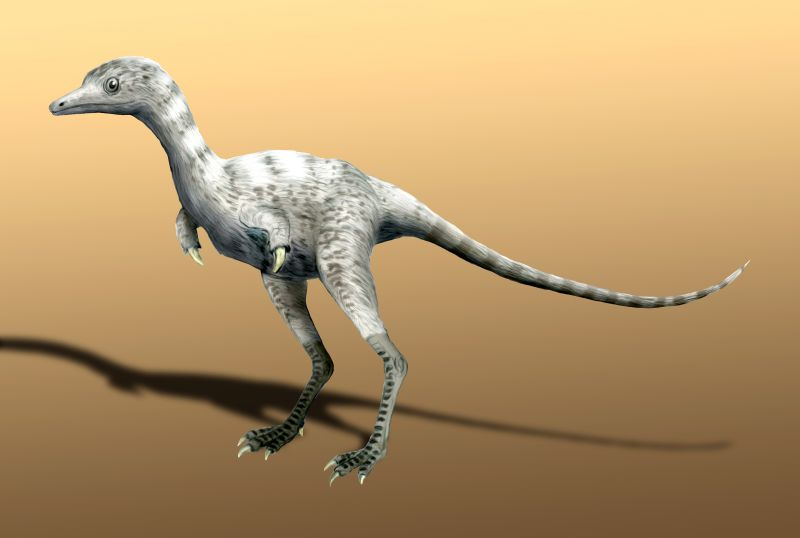
- Life restoration

Scientific classification
- Kingdom: Animalia
- Phylum: Chordata
- Class: Reptilia
- Clade: Dinosauria
- Clade: Saurischia
- Clade: Theropoda
- Family: †Alvarezsauridae
- Genus: †Ceratonykus; Alifanov & Barsbold, 2009
- Species: †C. oculatus

Binomial name
- †Ceratonykus oculatus Alifanov & Barsbold, 2009

= Ceratonykus =

Ceratonykus Temporal range: Late Cretaceous, Maastrichtian

Extinct genus of dinosaurs

Ceratonykus (meaning "horned claw") is a monospecific genus of alvarezsaurid dinosaur from Mongolia that lived during the Late Cretaceous (Maastrichtian) in what is now the Barun Goyot Formation. The type and only species, Ceratonykus oculatus, is known from a fragmentary skeleton, including an incomplete skull, of an adult individual. It was named and described in 2009 by Vladimir Alifanov and Rinchen Barsbold. Its describers questioned the traditional placement of alvarezsaurs in Theropoda, instead suggesting they were ornithischians, but this has not been accepted since. Ceratonykus has an estimated length of 75 centimetres (2.46 feet) and weight of 760 grams (1.68 pounds). It has been considered as a possible junior synonym of Parvicursor.

== Discovery and naming ==
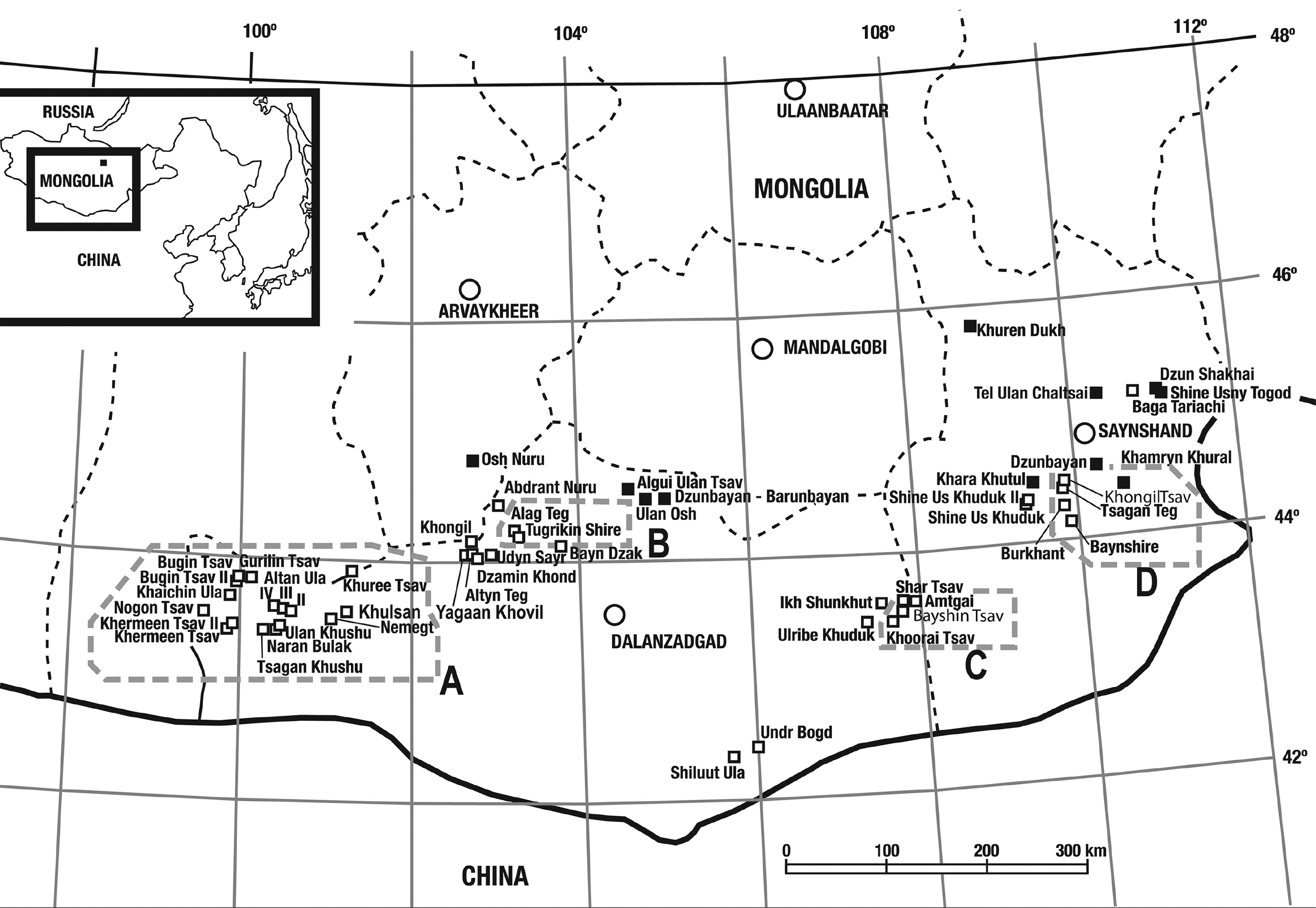
Fossil localities in Mongolia. Ceratonykus fossils have been collected at Hermiin Tsav (area A)

In 2003, a partial skeleton of an alvarezsaurid was discovered in the Barun Goyot Formation of the Khermiin Tsav locality, Mongolia by the Paleontological Center of the Mongolian Academy of Sciences (MPC) preparator Otkhoon Zhargal. The skeleton was enclosed in two pieces of rock during the time of the discovery. The specimen was subsequently named and described in 2009 by Vladimir Alifanov and Rinchen Barsbold. The holotype specimen, MPC no. 100/124, consists of an incomplete skull and lower jaw, cervical vertebrae, caudal vertebrae, sternum, left and right coracoids, a right humeral fragment, distal elements of forelimbs, fragmentary ilium, and hindlimbs. The specimen is of an adult individual based on the fusion of the astragali and tibiae, with partially obliterated sutures.

The generic name, Ceratonykus, is derived from the Greek words "ceratinus" (horned) and "onyx" (claw). The specific name, oculatus, is derived from the Latin word "oculatus" (sharp-sighted, big-eyed).

== Description ==
=== Size and distinguishing traits ===
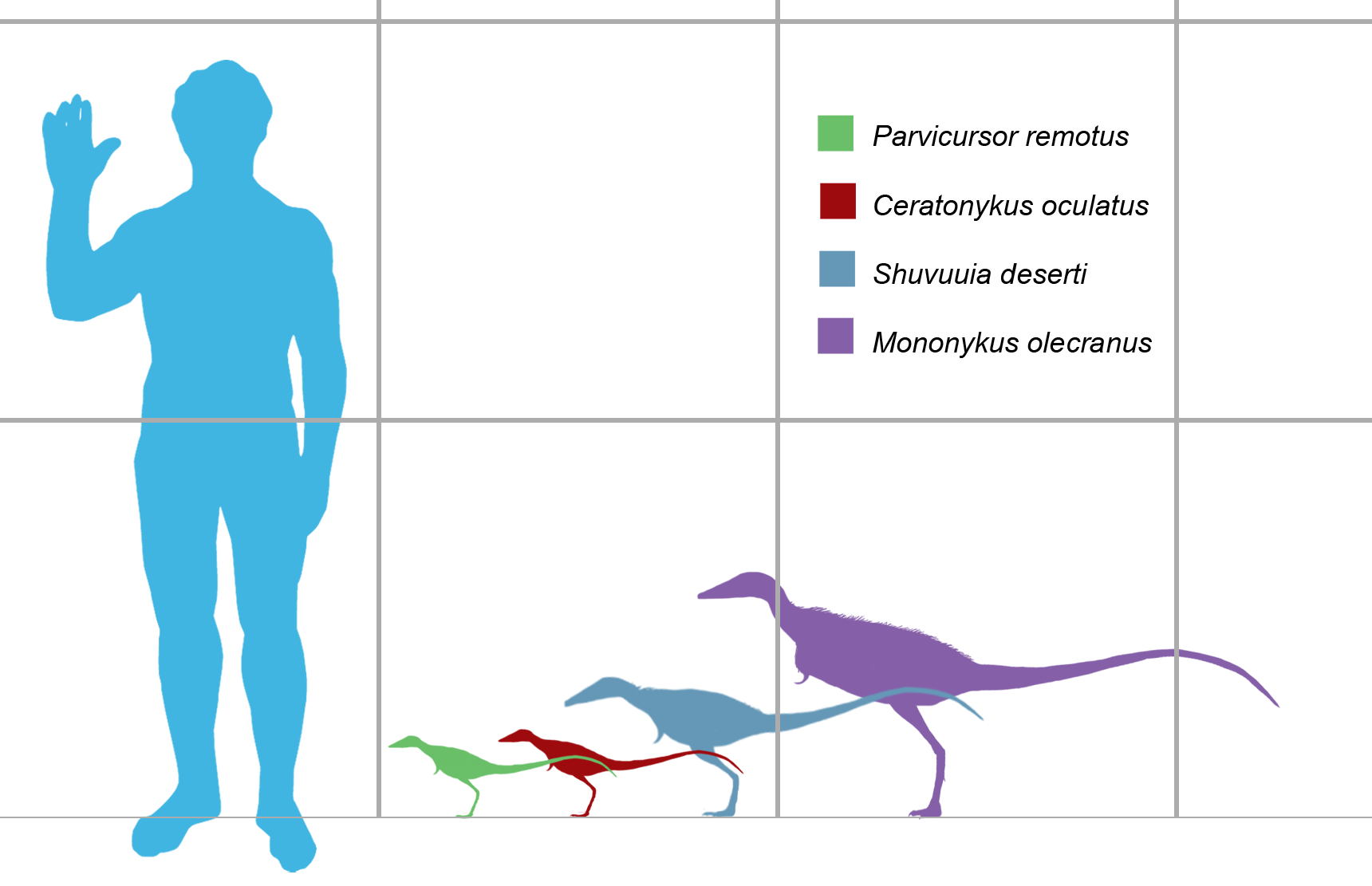
Size of various Alvarezsaurids compared to a human, Ceratonykus in red

In 2016, Gregory S. Paul gave Ceratonykus an estimated length of 0.6 metres (2.0 feet) and weight of 1 kilogram (2.2 pounds). However, Molina-Pérez and Larramendi (2016) gave Ceratonykus an estimated length of 75 centimetres (2.46 feet) and weight of 760 grams (1.68 pounds).

Alifanov & Barsbold (2009) originally diagnosed Ceratonykus based on the long preorbital skull region; an upper temporal fenestrae ovate that was 0.4 as long as the frontals; the length of the frontal being almost four times greater than its width; the frontals narrowing towards the rostrum into a narrow wedge; the prefrontals adjoining each other towards the middle; the basipterygoid processes being two-thirds as high as the quadrates; the dentaries form a deep and rostrally tapering depression; extensive mandibular fenestrae; narrow centra of cervical and anterior caudal vertebrae; the deltopectoral crest being separated from the humeral head by a notch; the basal phalanx of the major digit of the manus is extended, with its flanks moderately wide, and a narrow and symmetrical distal condyle; the postacetabular plate of the ilia possessing a relatively small longitudinal craniomedial crest; a strongly curved femora that is nearly half as long as tibiotarsus; a distinct fourth trochanter; an undeveloped cnemial crest of the tibiae; an ascending process of the astragali that is high and wide; the tarsometatarsals being 1.33 as long as the femora; the second and fourth metatarsals tightly adjoining each other over its entire extent; a deep notch that is formed proximodorsally between the metatarsals; the second metatarsals being shorter than the fourth distally; tarsometatarsals that are 3.5 times as long as the third metatarsals; and the basal phalanx of the fourth digit of the hind feet only being slightly shorter than the basal phalanx of second digit.

=== Cranium ===
The part of the skull nearest to the rostrum is narrow and extended, with a deep occipital region and large orbits. The antorbital fenestrae were at least half as large as the orbits and the temporal bars are relatively small, while the lower temporal fenestrae are narrow and slightly lower in height than the diameter of the orbits. Both of the frontals are paired, however, the left frontal is missing the posteromedial margin while the right frontal is only known from the rostral end. Both frontals are four times as long as wide, similar to Shuvuuia, and are narrow wedge-shaped in front view. The squamosal bones adjoin the postorbital and the paroccipital process, while also being relatively short and t-shaped. The postorbital bones have a large medial process and connect to the parietal and frontal by a different process. The ventral process of the lacrimals are narrow with the dorsal process being very long and rod-like. Both the jugals and the quadratojugals circular in cross section and are fused but do not form a suture. The quadrates are high, with the distal condyle being present on the occipital crest and the lateral crest being connected to the upper side of the contact zone of the squamosal and postorbital bones. As in Shuvuuia, a notch is present in between the lateral and occipital condyles. The paroccipital processes of the braincase are compressed towards the upper side and underside. The interior of the prootics have a coarse-cellular structure, which can only be viewed on the right side of the skull. The basioccipital forms an occipital condyle on a long and wide neck, while exoccipitals do no not form a part of the condyle. Unlike Shuvuuia, the basipterygoid processes diverge at almost 60° and are almost two-thirds as long as the quadrates.

The dentaries are long, with the rostral end slightly expanding vertically and curving downwards. The mandibular fenestrae have a wide oval shape and an anterior border that is in line with the border between the first and second thirds of the orbits. The lower jaw rami form the para-articular processes, which are in line with the quadrate–mandibular articulation.

The base of the right occipital process contained a cavity. A coarse-cellular structure is seen on the right side of the skull. The body of the basioccipital forms an occipital condyle, while the exoccipitals do not form a part of the condyle. The sphenoccipital tubercles are separated by a wide groove and a depression is present in the contact area of the basioccipital and basisphenoid. The basisphenoid coincides with the basipterygoid processes, which slightly compresses towards the sides and middle. The cerebral hemispheres constitute a majority of the brain. These cerebral hemi-spheres are separated from the midbrain by the presence of a sulcus and preserve traces of the brain membrane. An interhemispheric sulcus is present at the start of the olfactory tracts. The optic lobes are displaced towards the anterior, which is a characteristic of extant birds. The eyeballs would have been positioned towards the brain and are a quarter of the head length in diameter, a feature that suggests the eyesight of alvarezsaurs were the key afferent system. The acoustic tubercles are unusually wide and are positioned between the occipital edge of the cerebral hemispheres and cerebellum.

=== Postcrania ===
The atlas is likely represented by the intercentrum, which is low and elongated with the posterior region being broken off. There is a vertically positioned bone that is present on the fragment that likely represents the neural arch of the atlas. The series of three cervical vertebrae lack pleurocoels and has condyles that are very small and hemi-spherical. These condyles are also small in other vertebrae. The vertebral centra expand slightly more wider than those of Mononykus and are slightly more narrower than those of Shuvuuia. The diapophyses on the first two vertebrae of the series are relatively small but are wider at the base and extend towards the sides and underside. The parapophyses are separated by a ventral groove from each other and connect to the diapophyses by a narrow crest on the middle vertebra. The neural arch of this vertebra is wide and low, with the neural spine being completely absent. The first free caudal vertebra has a centrum that is narrow and is moderately high, with a small ventral keel being present near the condyle. Much like the first free caudal vertebra, the three articulated anterior caudal vertebrae have a centrum that is narrow but are high over the entire extent. Different to the first free caudal vertebra and the three articulated anterior caudal vertebrae are two isolated vertebrae of the middle caudal region that have a low centrum, and a barely viewable crest in place of the neural spine. However, all caudal vertebrae are procoelous.

The sternum of the pectoral girdle is an unpaired bone that lacks a pronounced medial keel. The side surface of the coracoids is convex, with the posterodorsal edge being thickened and a short crest forming close to the posterosuperior margin. The base of the humeral head was inclined caudally. The deltopectoral crest was separated from the humeral head by a notch, with the upper region resembling a high process based on the rounded outline of the base and foramen in the centre. Ceratonykus has a basal phalanx of the major digit that is similar to that of Mononykus, but differs in the narrower distal part. The second carpometacarpus possesses two spike like bones that range in size which may have been terminal phalanges of digits rather. The posterior plate of the left ilium is wide and flat, with the side margin being arched and the craniomedial part having a longitudinal crest.

The femora lack epiphyses and are convex in the proximal part, while the medial surface is straight. The tibiae also lacks epiphyses and the tibiotarsals are slightly curved towards the sides in the upper half. The tibiae are subcircular in cross section and lack a projecting part of the external cnemial crest, with the astragali being completely fused to the bones. The metatarsals are one and a third times as long as the femora, with the tarsometatarsus being three and a half times as long as the third metatarsals. Dorsal and palmar grooves are present in the area of connection of the metatarsals and tarsometatarsus, but disappear in the lower palmar third of the tarsometatarsals. As in Parvicursor, the second metatarsals were shorter than the fourth metatarsals, with the metatarsals being widened in the middle part in side view. Due to the poor preservation of the holotype specimen, the shape of articular facets of the metatarsals and digits is not known. Found in natural articulation were the basal phalanges of the second and third digits of the right foot. Ceratonykus has a similar ratio of the lengths of basal phalanges as Mononykus as the larger basal phalanx of the fourth digit is slightly shorter than the basal phalanx of the second digit, and the basal phalanx of the third digit is slightly longer than the basal phalanx of the second digit.

== Classification ==
Alifanov & Barsbold (2009) originally placed Ceratonykus within Alvarezsauria, within the clade Parvicursoridae, as sister taxon to Mononykus. The authors questioned the traditional placement of Alvarezsauria within Theropoda, instead suggesting they were ornithischians, but since then this has not been accepted. Qin et al. (2019) recovered Ceratonykus within a polytomy with Linhenykus, Shuvuuia, Mononykus and Parvicursor, a position also recovered by Xu et al. (2018). Lee et al. (2019) recovered it in a similar position, but with the inclusion of Nemegtonykus and a clade containing Kol, Xixianykus and Albinykus. In addition, it was also recovered within a polytomy by Fowler et al. (2020), with the inclusion of Trierarchuncus, and Averianov & Lopatin (2021), with the inclusion of Khulsanurus, in a strict consensus tree using unweighted characters. However, a strict consensus tree with implied weighting by Averianov & Lopatin (2021) placed it as sister taxon to Parvicursor. Agnolin et al. (2012) positioned Ceratonykus within the tribe Ceratonykini, as sister taxon to Xixianykus and Albinykus. Averianov & Lopatin (2022b) considered Ceratonykus to be a junior synonym of Parvicursor as the differences between both taxa were minimal and concerned characters that are likely to be ontogenetic and possibly also individual variation.

A phylogenetic analysis conducted by Averianov & Lopatin (2022b) is reproduced below.

- Alvarezsauridae
  - Alvarezsaurus
  - Parvicursorinae
    - - Linhenykus
      - - Ceratonykus
        - Parvicursor
    - - - Mononykus
        - Shuvuuia
      - - Xixianykus
        - - Albinykus
          - Ondogurvel

The results of an earlier analysis by Agnolin et al. (2012) are reproduced below.

- Alvarezsauridae
  - Patagonykinae
    - Patagonykus
    - Bonapartenykus
  - unnamed
    - Alvarezsaurus
    - Parvicursorinae
      - Ceratonykini
        - Ceratonykus
        - Xixianykus
        - Albinykus
      - - Parvicursor
        - Mononykini
          - - Albertonykus
            - Mononykus
          - - Linhenykus
            - Shuvuuia

== Paleobiology ==
In 2011, Vladimir Alifanov and Sergey Savelyev described the natural braincase cast of Ceratonykus. The authors noted that the brain anatomy is a linear structure, with no bends in the parasagittal plane at the boundaries between the mesencephalon and myelencephalon, a feature that is not seen in crocodiles, birds and other dinosaurs. The visual and auditory analysers are represented by separate lobes in the midbrain, with the optic lobes being displaced ventrolaterally like that of birds. Alifanov and Savelyev tested the hypothesis of climbing ancestors of alvarezsaurs by looking at the cerebellum of Ceratonykus, which has at least one transverse sulcus as in crocodiles but not lizards. Due to crocodiles having a better coordination of movements than lizards, as they need to orient themselves in three dimensional space, the authors proposed that the ancestor of alvarezsaurs were likely arboreal. The authors also suggested that the complex cerebellum could have been useful for efficient regulation of the speed and numerous movement patterns such as jumping in terrestrial alvarezsaurs. Additionally, they considered that specialization of the eyesight, hearing and sense of smell might have made alvarezsaurs efficient for searching for food and hunting. Agnolín et al. (2021) also noted that the enlarged spinal cord of the neck and the expansion of the cerebellum of Ceratonykus suggests a locomotor improvement in alvarezsaurs.

== Paleoenvironment ==
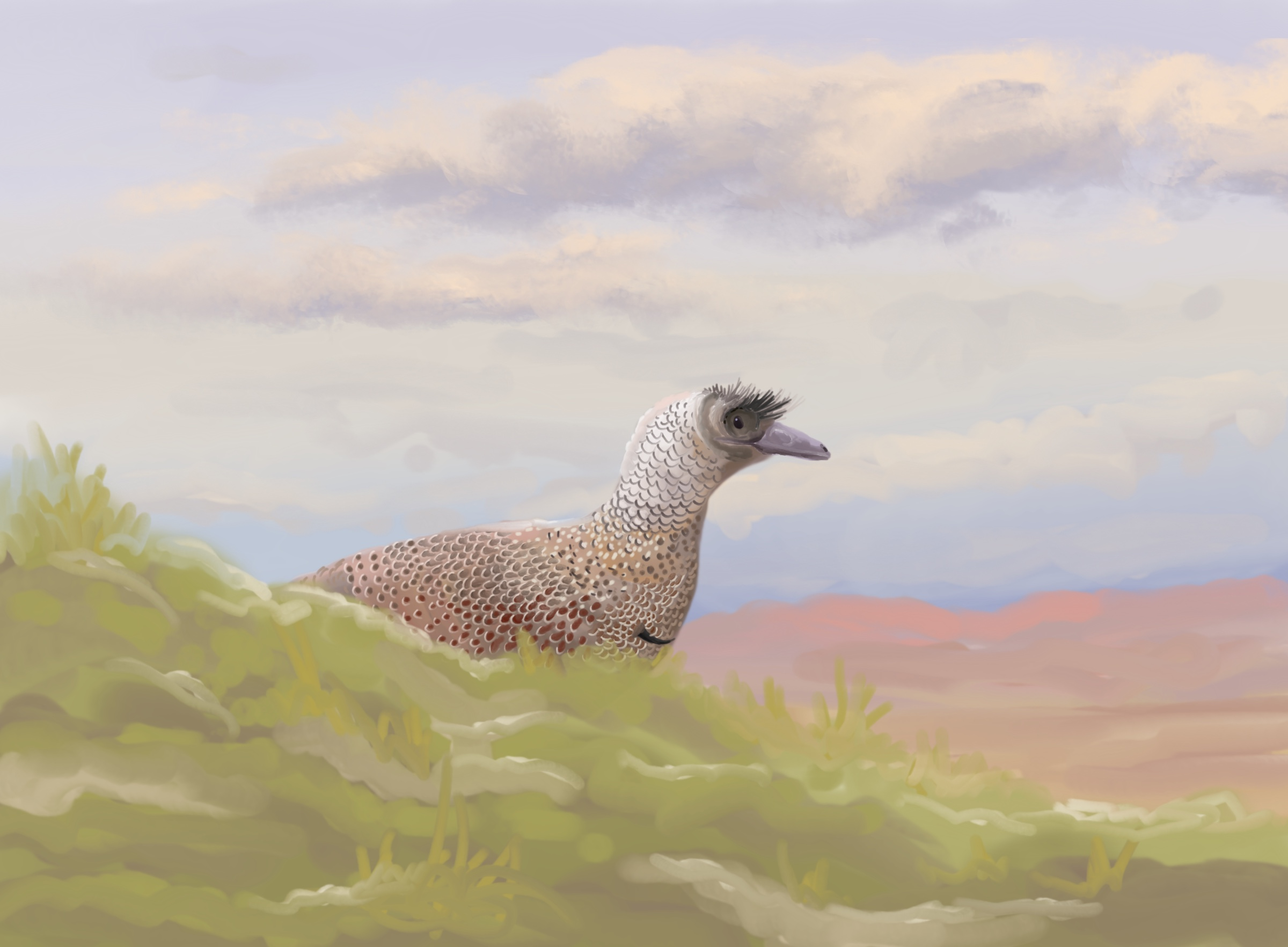
Parvicursor, an alvarezsaurid contemporaneous with Ceratonykus

Ceratonykus is known from the Barun Goyot Formation, which has been dated to the Campanian stage of the Late Cretaceous period. The Barun Goyot Formation has a thickness of 110 metres (360 feet) and overlies the Djadokhta Formation. The sediments of the formation were deposited in various conditions, with the lower part consisting of alternating dune deposits and lakes that existed in interdune areas, while the upper part consisted of sediments that were deposited over an area similar to takyrs that was flooded at irregular intervals. Overall, the formation had a semi-arid climate with significant rainfall.

The fauna of the Barun Goyot Formation consists of the alvarezsaurids Khulsanurus, Ondogurvel and Parvicursor, the ankylosaurine ankylosaurids Saichania, Tarchia, Zaraapelta and an indeterminate ankylosaurid; the ceratopsians Bagaceratops, Breviceratops and possibly Udanoceratops; the velociraptorine dromaeosaurids Kuru and Shri devi; the halszkaraptorine unenlagiid Hulsanpes; the pachycephalosaurid Tylocephale; the oviraptorids Conchoraptor, Heyuannia and Nemegtomaia, the titanosaur sauropod Quaesitosaurus; the enantiornithines Gobipteryx and Gobipipus; and the ornithuromorph bird Hollanda.
