= Sergey Savelyev =

Sergey Savelyev may refer to:

- Sergey Savelyev (skier) (1948-2005), Soviet cross-country skier
- Sergey Savelyev (scientist) (born 1959), Russian biologist
- Sergey Savelyev (speed skater) (born 1972), Russian speed skater
