= Elbretornis =

Elbretornis Temporal range: Maastrichtian ~70 Ma

Scientific classification
- Kingdom: Animalia
- Phylum: Chordata
- Class: Reptilia
- Clade: Dinosauria
- Clade: Saurischia
- Clade: Theropoda
- Clade: Avialae
- Clade: †Enantiornithes
- Genus: †Elbretornis; Walker & Dyke 2009
- Species: †E. bonapartei

Binomial name
- †Elbretornis bonapartei Walker & Dyke 2009

Extinct genus of birds

Elbretornis is an extinct genus of enantiornithine which existed in what is now Salta Province, Argentina during the late Cretaceous period.

== Etymology ==
It was named by Cyril A. Walker and Gareth J. Dyke in 2009, and the type and so far only species is Elbretornis bonapartei. The generic name refers to the "El Brete" locality, where the fossil remains were found, and the Greek word for "bird" (ornis). The specific name honors José Bonaparte.

== Description ==
It is known from the holotype PVL 4022, left humerus and associated right radius, ulna, scapula, coracoid, and tibiotarsus, recovered from the El Brete locality (Maastrichtian age), Lecho Formation of Argentina. The holotype indicates an animal with a length of 33 cm (13 in), hip height of 24 cm (9.4 in), and weight of 570 g (20 oz).

== Taxonomy ==
As few elements are known from Elbretornis, it might actually belong to one of the El Brete enantiornithines known only from leg bones and described earlier, namely Lectavis, Soroavisaurus or Yungavolucris. However, Elbretornis was a smallish species, and the others were apparently all distinctly larger birds.
