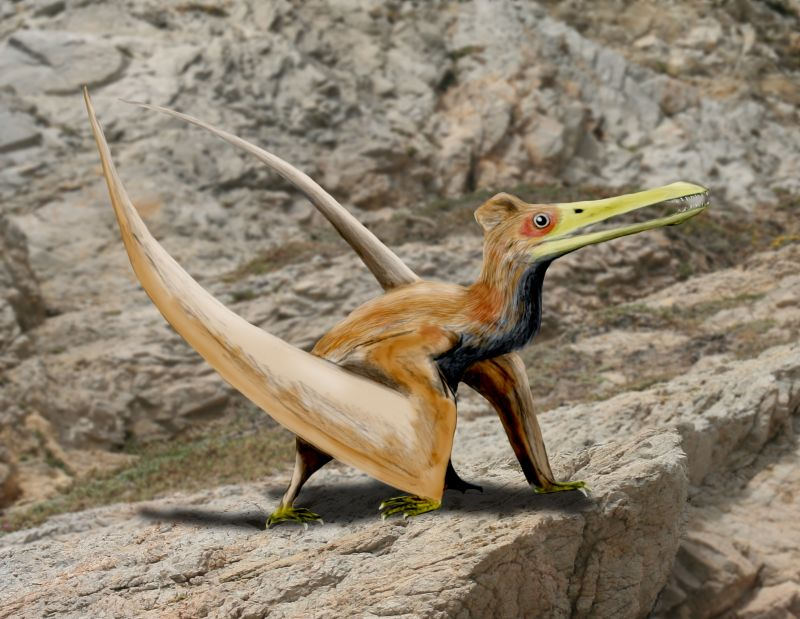
- Life restoration

Scientific classification
- Kingdom: Animalia
- Phylum: Chordata
- Class: Reptilia
- Order: †Pterosauria
- Suborder: †Pterodactyloidea
- Genus: †Ningchengopterus

Type species
- †Ningchengopterus liuae Lü, 2009

= Ningchengopterus =

Ningchengopterus Temporal range: Early Cretaceous, 130–122 Ma

Genus of pterodactyloid pterosaur from the Early Cretaceous

Ningchengopterus is a genus of pterodactyloid pterosaur from the Early Cretaceous period (Aptian stage). Its fossil remains were found in the Yixian Formation of what is now China.

== Discovery and naming ==
It is known from a juvenile specimen, holotype CYGB-0035, an almost complete articulated skeleton of a hatchling also showing soft parts, such as the flight membrane and pycnofibres, compressed on a plate and counterplate. It was the first small toothed pterodactyloid pterosaur specimen found in China. The type species Ningchengopterus liuae was named and described by Lü Junchang in 2009. The genus name combines a reference to the Ningcheng district in Inner Mongolia with a Latinised Greek pteron, "wing". The specific name honours Ms Liu Jingyi who collected the fossil and donated it to science.

== Description ==
Ningchengopterus was typified by the possession of about fifty teeth, twelve in each upper jaw and thirteen in each lower jaw. The teeth are curved, conical and pointed. The skull has a length of thirty-eight millimetres. The snout is elongated and tapering. The lower jaws show an incipient crest.

== Classification ==
The specimen could not be more precisely determined than Pterodactyloidea. It shared the relative proportions of the first and second phalanx of the flight finger with the Ctenochasmatidae, and especially Eosipterus found in the same formation, but showed no further synapomorphies of that group, so that Lü abstained from placing it in that clade.

== Palaeobiology ==
The teeth suggested that Ningchengopterus was a fish eater. The fully formed flight membrane was seen as confirmation of a hypothesis by Mark Unwin that pterosaurs displayed little parental care, their "babies" being able to fly shortly after hatching.

== See also ==
- List of pterosaur genera
- Timeline of pterosaur research
- 2009 in paleontology
- Yixian Formation
