= Martinavis =

Martinavis Temporal range: Late Cretaceous, 75–70 Ma

Scientific classification
- Domain: Eukaryota
- Kingdom: Animalia
- Phylum: Chordata
- Clade: Dinosauria
- Clade: Saurischia
- Clade: Theropoda
- Clade: Avialae
- Clade: †Enantiornithes
- Clade: †Euenantiornithes
- Genus: †Martinavis; Walker, Buffetaut & Dyke, 2007

Type species
- †Martinavis cruzyensis Walker, Buffetaut & Dyke, 2007

Species
- †M. cruzyensis Walker, Buffetaut & Dyke, 2007; †M. vincei Walker, Buffetaut & Dyke, 2007; †M. minor Walker & Dyke, 2009; †M. saltariensis Walker & Dyke, 2009; †M. whetstonei Walker & Dyke, 2009

Extinct genus of birds

Martinavis is a genus of enantiornithine birds which existed in what is now southern France, North America and Salta Province, Argentina during the late Cretaceous period. It was named by Cyril A. Walker, Eric Buffetaut and Gareth J. Dyke in 2007, and the type species is Martinavis cruzyensis.

== Description ==
M. cruzyensis is known from the holotype ACAP-M 1957, a complete uncrushed right humerus, recovered from the Massecaps locality, Cruzy, which is in a Campanian/Maastrichtian-stage deposits in the Grès à Reptiles Formation of France. This species reached 42.7 cm (16.8 in) in length, 18.7 cm (7.4 in) in hip height and 1.1 kg (2.4 lb) in weight.

A second species, M. vincei is known from the holotype PVL 4054, a complete left humerus and from the associated paratype PVL 4059, a distal end of left humerus, recovered from the El Brete locality (Maastrichtian age), Lecho Formation of Argentina.

A possible third species is represented by the unnamed specimen KU-NM-37 from United States.

In 2009, three additional species were named from the same location as M. vincei:

- M. minor is known from the holotype PVL 4046, a distally imperfect right humerus;
- M. saltariensis is known from the holotype PVL 4025, an incomplete left humerus, lacking the median ridge;
- M. whetstonei is known from the holotype PVL 4028, a distally imperfect left humerus.

M. vincei is the largest of the El Brete taxa, approaching its huge (by enantiornithine standards), sympatric and coeval Enantiornis in size. PVL 4054 and PVL 4059 indicate the animals with a length of 51 cm (20 in), hip height of 22.3 cm (8.8 in), and weight of 1.8 kg (4.0 lb). M. saltariensis is the second largest species, with a length of 44.2 cm (17.4 in), hip height of 19.3 cm (7.6 in), and weight of 1.2 kg (2.6 lb). M. minor is notably smaller than the former two, while M. whetstonei was a diminutive version of M. vincei, being at most half its size. In addition to size, the species differ slightly in proportions and qualitative features, making it unlikely the represent sexual or age variation.

== Taxonomy ==
As few elements are known from El Brete Martinavis, it might be the same species as one of the other enantiornithines of that locality which were described earlier based on leg bones. While the tarsometatarsus of Yungavolucris seems too wide (and short) to match Martinavis, and Lectavis was slightly larger (and its tibiotarsus differs from one tentatively assigned to Martinavis), the Soroavisaurus tarsometatarsus is about the size expected for M. vincei and perhaps M. saltariensis. These differ slightly in size but also in proportions, meaning M. saltariensis, while generally smaller, might nonetheless have had thicker legs, and thus match Soroavisaurus. As Yungavolucris is assumed to be a foot-propelled swimmer however the synonymity of at least some Martinavis specimens with it could explain the genus' prevalence in marine biomes.
