= Zheng Guangmei =

Chinese ornithologist (1932–2023)

- 郑光美
- Born: 30 November 1932; Harbin, Heilongjiang, Manchukuo
- Died: 3 October 2023 (aged 90); Beijing, China
- Education: Beijing Normal University; Northeast Normal University
- Scientific career
- Fields: Ornithology
- Workplaces: Beijing Normal University

Chinese name
- Simplified Chinese: 郑光美
- Traditional Chinese: 鄭光美
Transcriptions
Standard Mandarin
- Hanyu Pinyin: Zhèng Guāngměi

Zheng Guangmei (Chinese: 郑光美; 30 November 1932 – 3 October 2023) was a Chinese bird ecologist, and an academician of the Chinese Academy of Sciences.

He was a delegate to the 8th National People's Congress.

== Biography ==
Zheng was born in Harbin, Heilongjiang, Manchukuo, on 30 November 1932, while his ancestral home in Beijing. After the occupation of Northeast China by the Imperial Japanese Army, his family moved back to Beijing. He attended the Beijing Shijia Hutong Primary School (北京史家胡同小学) and Beijing No. 8 High School. In 1950, he enrolled at the Department of Biology, Beijing Normal University, he stayed for teaching after graduation. In 1956, he did his postgraduate work at Northeast Normal University.

He returned to Beijing in 1958 and continued to teach at Beijing Normal University, where he worked successively as associate professor (1978), full professor (1986), and doctoral supervisor (1990).

On 3 October 2023, he died of an illness in Beijing, at the age of 90.

== Publications ==
- 中国鸟类分类与分布名录 [A Checklist on the Classification and Distribution of the Bird of China] (in Chinese). Beijing: Science Press. 2011. ISBN 9787030312211.
- 鸟类学 [Ornithology] (in Chinese). Beijing: Beijing Normal University Publishing House. 2012. ISBN 9787303139477.
- 世界鸟类分类与分布名录 [A Checklist on the Classification and Distribution of the Bird of the World] (in Chinese). Beijing: Science Press. 2021. ISBN 9787030691590.

== Honours and awards ==
- 2000 State Natural Science Award (Second Class) for the Ecological Biology and Domestication and Reproduction of Endangered Pheasants, a Chinese Specialty.
- November 2003 Member of the Chinese Academy of Sciences (CAS)
