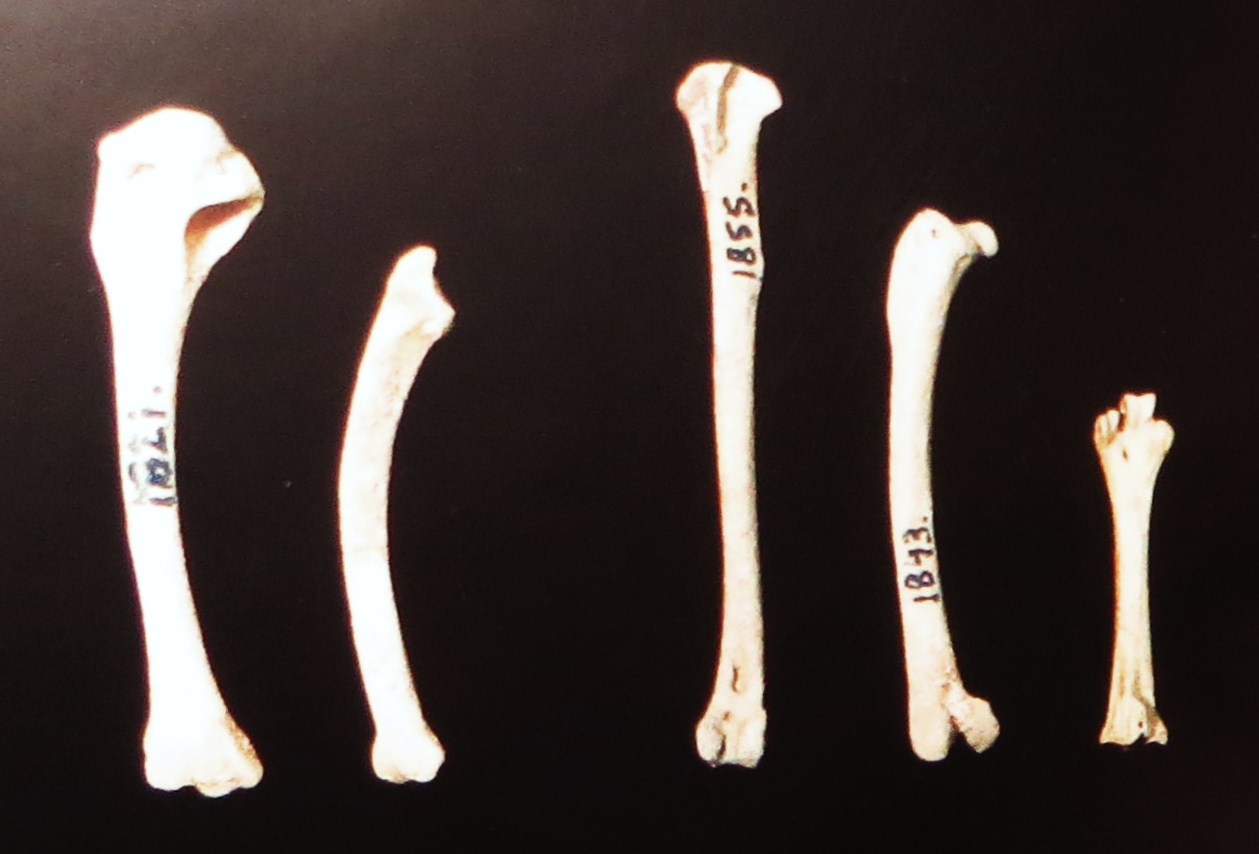
- Limb bones

Scientific classification
- Kingdom: Animalia
- Phylum: Chordata
- Class: Aves
- Order: Galliformes
- Family: Phasianidae
- Genus: Coturnix
- Species: C. gomerae

Binomial name
- Coturnix gomerae Jaume, McMinn & Alcover, 1993

= Canary Islands quail =

Canary Islands quail Temporal range: Late Pleistocene-Early Holocene

Extinct species of bird

The Canary Islands quail (Coturnix gomerae) is an extinct quail species that once occurred on the island of La Gomera (Canary Islands, Spain).

== Extinction ==
This quail was most likely still present in the Canary Islands after humans settled there. Cats could have been one of the causes of the disappearance of some little flying birds like the Canary Islands quail.

== See also ==
- List of extinct birds
- List of extinct animals
- List of extinct animals of Europe
