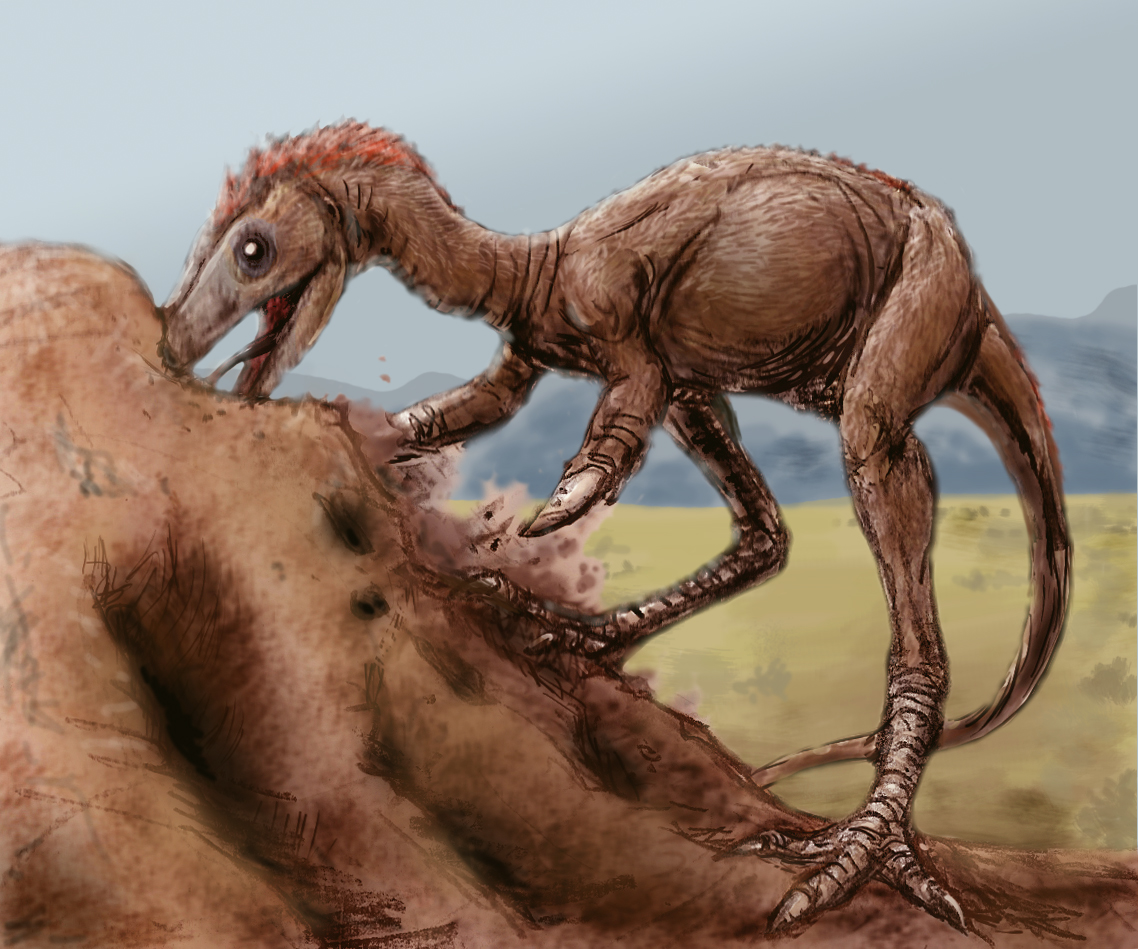
- Life restoration as an alvarezsauroid, depicted feeding from a termite mound

Scientific classification
- Kingdom: Animalia
- Phylum: Chordata
- Class: Reptilia
- Clade: Dinosauria
- Clade: Saurischia
- Clade: Theropoda
- Genus: †Kol; Turner, Nesbitt, & Norell, 2009
- Species: †K. ghuva

Binomial name
- †Kol ghuva Turner, Nesbitt, & Norell, 2009

= Kol ghuva =

Kol ghuva Temporal range: Late Cretaceous, 75 Ma

Extinct species of dinosaur

Kol (from the Mongolian хөл/köl, meaning "foot") is an extinct genus of coelurosaurian theropod dinosaur from the Late Cretaceous of Mongolia. The type and only species is Kol ghuva (from the Mongolian гува/ghuv-a, meaning "beautiful"). The type specimen was excavated from the Ukhaa Tolgod locality of the Djadochta Formation, dating to about 75 million years ago. It is believed to have been about twice the size of the contemporaneous Shuvuuia. However, unlike Shuvuuia, which is known from many well preserved specimens, and although Ukhaa Tolgod has been thoroughly explored, Kol is known only from one complete foot, suggesting that it must have been relatively rare in that ecosystem.

Because of the incomplete nature of the type specimen (catalog number IGM 100/2011), the exact relationship of Kol to other coelurosaurs has been difficult to determine. However, Kol shows an extreme arctometatarsalian condition of the foot bones, in which the middle metatarsal is severely pinched between the outer bones (usually considered an adaptation for fast running, also seen in ornithomimosaurs and tyrannosaurs). It has been estimated at 1.8–2.4 metres (5.9–7.9 ft) in length and 20–24 kilograms (44–53 lb) in body mass, making it one of the largest members of the group.

The genus was originally placed in the family Alvarezsauridae. Some studies have instead recovered Kol outside the Alvarezsauridae, more closely related to Avimimus within the Oviraptorosauria, and a recent study of Mongolian alvarezsaurids excluded Kol from the Alvarezsauridae.
