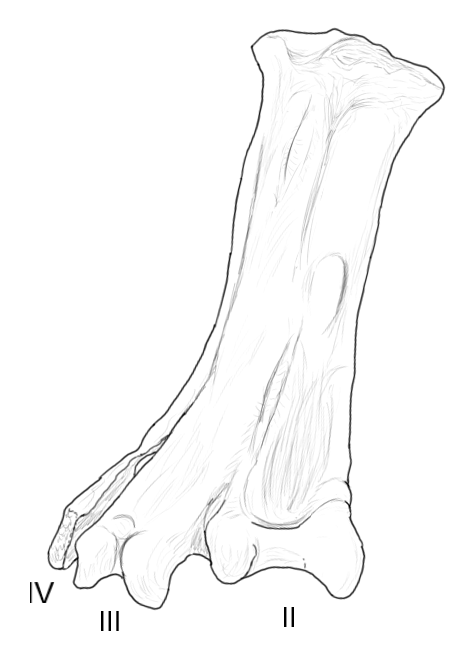
- The holotype right tarsometatarsus of Yungavolucris

Scientific classification
- Kingdom: Animalia
- Phylum: Chordata
- Class: Reptilia
- Clade: Dinosauria
- Clade: Saurischia
- Clade: Theropoda
- Clade: Avialae
- Clade: †Enantiornithes
- Genus: †Yungavolucris; Chiappe 1993
- Species: †Y. brevipedalis

Binomial name
- †Yungavolucris brevipedalis Chiappe 1993

= Yungavolucris =

Yungavolucris Temporal range: Maastrichtian ~70.6–66 Ma

Extinct genus of birds

Yungavolucris is a genus of enantiornitheans. It contains the single species Yungavolucris brevipedalis, which lived in the Late Cretaceous (Maastrichtian, c.70.6 – 66 mya). The fossil bones were found in the Lecho Formation at estancia El Brete, Argentina."Yungavolucris brevipedalis" means "Short-footed Yungas bird". The generic name, Yungavolucris is after the Yungas region + the Latin volucris, which translates to "bird" (literally "flyer"). The specific name brevipedalis is from the Latin brevis, which means "short", + pedalis, from the Latin pes, meaning "foot".

== Description ==
The only remains of Yungavolucris discovered so far consist of several tarsometatarsals, of which only the holotype (PVL-4053) is nearly complete. These tarsometatarsals are unusually very stout and flat, and also very wide at the lower end. These specimens are small, just over 4 cm (1.5 inches) long, and if its legs and feet were not excessively shortened in relation to the body, the bird was about the size of a large blackbird in life. The width of the bone is considerable though, being about twice the width of the tarsometatarsals of Lectavis and Soroavisaurus, two of its contemporaries. Thus, if the leg and foot only shortened and did not also become wider, it might be expected to have been a heavily built, sluggish and maybe even flightless bird the size of a large chicken: a length of 50 cm (20 in), hip height of 25 cm (10 in), and weight of 1.75 kg (4 lb).

Metatarsal IV (the outermost bone of the tarsometatarsus) is very thin and diminished, but nevertheless about the same length as metatarsal III (the middle bone of the tarsometatarsus). In addition, the end of metatarsal III is bent outwards, to a position that would in other birds fall between toes 3 and 4. Metatarsal II (the innermost preserved bone of the tarsometatarsus) has a very broad and pulley-shaped trochlea (toe joint). A small bony bump (a dorsomedial projection) is present just above the inside edge of this trochlea. A ridge extends between the metatarsals II and III in the lower part of each bone. The middle of metatarsal II preserved a large tubercule (a node for muscle attachment) while the near part of metatarsal III possesses a thin ridge. No metatarsal I or hallux is preserved in any of the specimens. As in most enantiornitheans, no hypotarsus (a wide ridge on the back of the tarsometatarsus) is present.

== Relationships ==
Irrespective of the peculiar autapomorphies present in this taxon's remains, its affinities are uncertain. It has sometimes been compared to avisaurids, a group of late Cretaceous enantiornitheans which are also primarily known from tarsometatarsals. A small phylogenetic analysis performed during its initial description in 1993 found several most parsimonious trees with conflicting results. Some placed it as a closer relative of avisaurids than Lectavis bretincola (an unusually long-legged enantiornithean discovered in the same deposit) was. However, other most parsimonious trees offered the opposite result, with Lectavis being a closer relative of avisaurids than Yungavolucris.

Since 1993, additional analyses have broadened the gap between Yungavolucris and avisaurids. Other enantiornitheans, such as Enantiophoenix, Halimornis, and Concornis, have been found to be closer to Avisaurus than either Yungavolucris or Lectavis. A close relationship between the two El Brete taxa and Avisaurus seems highly unlikely.

As only the tarsometatarsus is known from Yungavolucris, it might be the same species as one of the other El Brete enantiornitheans described based on forelimb bones. The size of Yungavolucris is hard to tell; the comparatively huge Enantiornis might be a match if Yungavolucris had short legs of normal width, but Enantiornis seems to be a fairly conventionally-built taxon. If Yungavolucris had both unusually short and wide legs, it might have been the size of the small species of Martinavis or maybe the slightly larger Elbretornis. However, these genera have tibiotarsus material tentatively referred to them, and while this material may not actually belong to Martinavis or Elbretornis, it does not match the shape of a tibiotarsus that would form a working ankle with the Yungavolucris tarsometatarsus.

A few studies have recovered it as a close relative of Grabauornis.

== See also ==
- Gargantuavis – a huge flightless bird of unknown affiliations, a European contemporary of Yungavolucris
- Patagopteryx – a mid-sized flightless relative of modern birds from southern Argentina, slightly older than Yungavolucris
