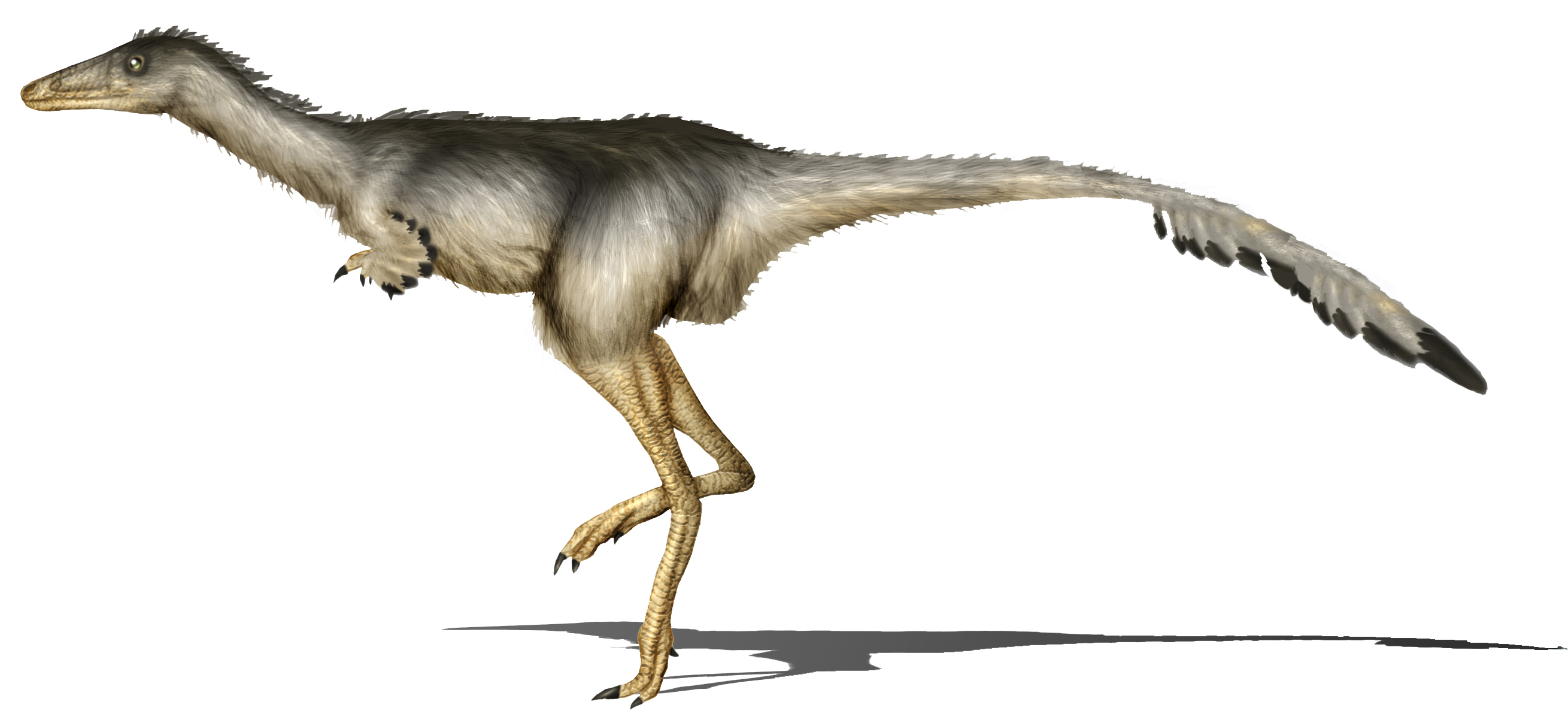
- Life restoration

Scientific classification
- Kingdom: Animalia
- Phylum: Chordata
- Class: Reptilia
- Clade: Dinosauria
- Clade: Saurischia
- Clade: Theropoda
- Family: †Alvarezsauridae
- Genus: †Albertonykus; Longrich & Currie, 2009
- Species: †A. borealis

Binomial name
- †Albertonykus borealis Longrich & Currie, 2009

= Albertonykus =

Albertonykus Temporal range: Late Cretaceous, 68.5 Ma

Extinct genus of dinosaurs

Albertonykus (meaning "Alberta claw") is an extinct genus of alvarezsaurid dinosaur from the Maastrichtian-age (Upper Cretaceous) rocks of the Horseshoe Canyon Formation of Alberta, Canada. It is known from forelimb and hindlimb remains from multiple individuals. All but two of the specimens come from a bonebed dominated by Albertosaurus, located at the top of Unit 4 of the Horseshoe Canyon Formation, dating to ~68.5 million years ago.

Albertonykus is interpreted as having fed on wood-nesting termites because the forelimbs appear specialized for digging but are too short for burrowing. Albertonykus is the earliest known North American alvarezsaurid. Isolated bones of alvarezsaurids are known from late Maastrichtian rocks in Montana and Wyoming (USA). The bones now belonged to a new genus, Trierarchuncus.

The type species is A. borealis, described by Nick Longrich and Phillip Currie in 2009. The specific name (borealis) means "north".

== Discovery ==
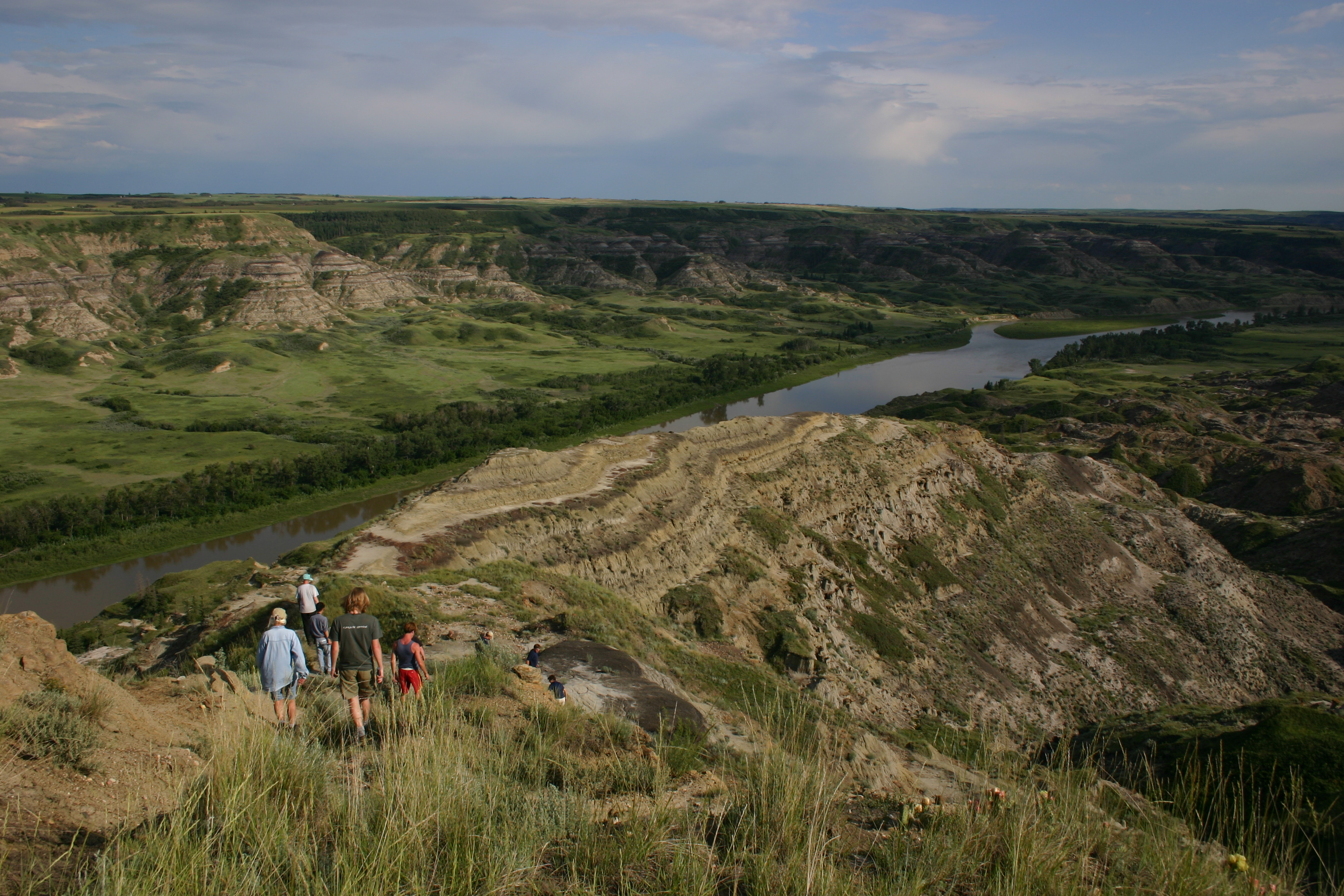
Outcrops of the upper Horseshoe Canyon Formation in Dry Island Buffalo Jump Provincial Park, near the site of the Albertosaurus bonebed that produced Albertonykus

Until the 1990s it was unknown that dinosaurs like Albertonykus existed. A chain of new discoveries from Asia and South America exposed the existence of these previously unknown theropod dinosaurs. North American finds remained rare. The bones of Albertonykus were discovered through a coincidental association with a much larger theropod dinosaur. In 1910, paleontologist Barnum Brown and his crew found a site filled with the bones of the gigantic tyrannosaurid Albertosaurus sarcophagus. They unearthed the remains of at least nine different specimens of Albertosaurus in the single site, but stopped digging after just two weeks.

Renewed quarrying in the Albertosaurus bonebed in Dry Island Provincial Park again produced the remains of over twenty specimens of Albertosaurus, and the quarry has yet to be fully excavated. It is not known why so many tyrannosaurs were found in one place: paleontologist Nick Longrich speculated that the site was part of a predator trap, where trapped prey animals drew predators to their deaths.

At the same site, over a dozen arm and leg bones belonging to an unknown species of small theropod were in 2002 excavated by a team of scientist led by Philip John Currie of the University of Alberta. The bones were then stored at the Royal Tyrrell Museum in Alberta. In 2005 Nick Longrich, then a student at the University of Calgary, happened upon the small fossils while comparing Albertosaurus claws to other dinosaur species. Longrich recognized the fossils as alvarezsaurid, concluding that they represented a new species. Other fragments of Albertonykus were then recognized in the collections, which had not been identified as a separate species.

== Description ==
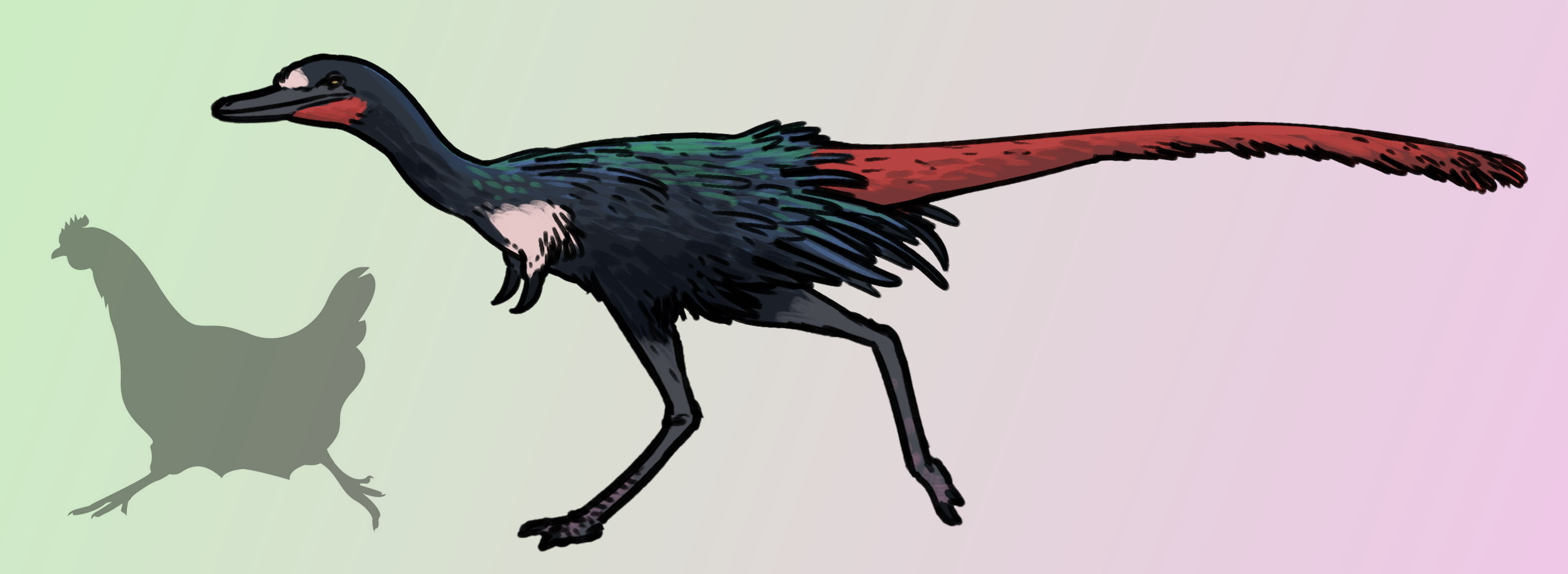
Life restoration and size comparison

Albertonykus is the smallest known alvarezsauridae ever discovered in North America, measuring 1.1 m (3.6 ft) long and weighing 5 kg (11 lb). Alvarezsaurs typically had slender hind legs, long rigid tails, and unusually short arms that were powerfully built to support a large claw. Although no skull bones of Albertonykus have been found, related animals from Mongolia show that they likely had long, slender snouts filled with tiny teeth similar to those of armadillos and anteaters. It is likely that Albertonykus ate insects, using its large thumb claw to tear open rotten logs to find its prey. As in other alvarezsaurs, the forelimbs of Albertonykus were specialized for digging, but were too short to permit burrowing. Unfortunately, at this time the skeleton of Albertonykus is not complete, but its Mongolian relatives give us a distinct idea of what the rest of the skeleton would have looked like.

Possible prey items were evaluated and compared with the fossil record of social insects. Ants were not an important part of the ecosystem during the Cretaceous, and mound-building termites do not appear until the Eocene. This leaves the possibility that Albertonykus preyed on wood-nesting termites. This hypothesis was tested by examining petrified wood from the Horseshoe Canyon Formation, where Albertonykus was found. The wood found there frequently contains borings, which resemble those of termites.

== Classification ==
Albertonykus is a member of an unusual theropod group known as the Alvarezsauridae and is one of only a few alvarezsaurid fossils that has been found outside of South America and Asia. After a phylogenetic analysis, it was shown that Albertonykus is a member of the Asian clade Mononykini, which supported the hypothesis that the alvarezsaurs originated in South America, and then dispersed to Asia through North America. The unearthing of Albertonykus provided important information into the biology of the Alvarezsauridae.
