= Sergey Savelyev (scientist) =

- Born: March 7, 1959 (age 67); Moscow
- Education: MGZPI
- Scientific career
- Fields: biology, evolutionism
- Workplaces: Scientific Research Institute of Human Morphology RAS

Sergey Vyacheslavovich Savelyev (Russian: Серге́й Вячесла́вович Саве́льев; born March 7, 1959) is a Russian doctor of biological sciences, Professor. Sergey Savelyev's statements and books have been repeatedly criticized by experts for a large number of factual errors and incorrect conclusions.

== Biography ==
Born in Moscow, he graduated from the Biology and Chemistry Faculty of MGZPI (now the Sholokhov Moscow State University for Humanities), worked at the Brain Institute of the USSR Academy of Medical Sciences, since 1984 at the Institute of Human Morphology RAMS. The author of the idea of cerebral sorting.

== Scientific activity ==
For many years engaged in the study of fetal pathologies of the nervous system, he develops methods of their diagnosis.

In 2002 he published a monograph, illustrating it with original snapshots of entire human embryos in the first days after implantation and neurulation period.

For many years he is engaged in research in the field of paleoneurology with the Paleontological Institute of Russian Academy of Sciences. Together with senior scientists of the Institute A.V. Lavrov (laboratory of mammals) and V.R. Alifanov (laboratory of paleoherpetology) he established the principles of brain organization of dinosaurs, creodonts and gienodonts.

In 2013 he headed the working group to study the brain of a mammoth, which included employees of the Research Institute of Human Morphology RAMS, Yakutsk Academy of Sciences and the Paleontological Institute RAS.

In 2014, he led the experiment "Gecko-F4", the purpose of which was to study the effect of microgravity on the sexual behavior, the body of adult animals and the embryonic development of geckos Phelsuma ornata in a two-month orbital experiment on the Russian research satellite "Foton-M No.4".

Sergey Savelyev is the author of the idea of cerebral sorting.

== Critics ==
Russian paleontologist Stanislav Drobyshevsky and science journalist Sergey Sokolov published very detailed and devastated critics on the Saveljev´s book "Возникновение мозга человека" (Human brain genesis). In 2018 Saveliev got the award "Почетный академик ВРАЛ" (rough translation would be 'Honorable member of academy LIED', an award, mocking pseudo-scientific research).

== Bibliography ==
- Церебральный сортинг. — Moscow: Веди, 2016. — 232 с. — ISBN 978-5-94624-049-9
- Нищета мозга. 2-е изд., доп. — М.: Веди, 2016. — 200 с. — ISBN 978-5-94624-048-2
- Изменчивость и гениальность. 2-е изд., доп. — М.: Веди, 2015. — 144 с. — ISBN 978-5-94624-045-1
- Нищета мозга. — М.: Веди, 2014. — 192 с. — ISBN 978-5-94624-044-4
- Изменчивость и гениальность. — М.: Веди, 2012. — 128 с. — ISBN 978-5-94624-041-3.
- Возникновение мозга человека. — М.: Веди, 2010. — 324 с. — ISBN 978-5-94624-037-6.
- Эмбриональная патология нервной системы. — М.: Веди, 2007. — 216 с. — ISBN 978-5-94624-032-1.
- Внутриутробное развитие человека: Руководство для врачей. Под ред. А. П. Милованова, С. В. Савельева. — М.: МВД, 2006. — 384 с. — ISBN 5-93649-017-3.
- Атлас мозга человека. — М.: Веди, 2005. — 400 с. — ISBN 5-94624-022-6.
- Происхождение мозга. — М.: Веди, 2005. — 368 с. — ISBN 5-94624-025-0
- Стереоскопический атлас мозга человека. — М.: «AREA XVII», 1996. — 352 с.
- Савельев С. В., Негашева М. А. Практикум по анатомии мозга человека. Учеб. пособие для студентов вузов. 2-е изд., перераб. и доп. — М.: Веди, 2005. — 200 с. — ISBN 5-94624-020-X.
- Стадии эмбрионального развития мозга человека. — М.: Веди, 2002. — 112 с. — ISBN 5-94624-007-2.
- Сравнительная анатомия нервной системы позвоночных. — М.: Гэотар, 2001
- Введение в зоопсихологию. — М.: «Area XVII», 1998. — 292 с.
- Эмбриональное формообразование мозга позвоночных. — М.: МГУ, 1993.
