= Lecho Formation =

Geologic formation in Argentina

- Stratigraphic range: Early Maastrichtian; ~70–68 Ma
- Type: Geological formation
- Unit of: Salta Group
- Underlies: Yacoraite Formation
- Overlies: Los Blanquitos Formation

Lithology
- Primary: Sandstone

Location
- Coordinates: 26.1°S 65.4°W
- Approximate paleocoordinates: 28.6°S 52.0°W
- Region: Jujuy, Salta
- Country: Argentina
- Extent: Salta Basin
- Lecho Formation (Argentina)

The Lecho Formation is a geological formation in the Salta Basin of the provinces Jujuy and Salta of northwestern Argentina. Its strata date back to the Early Maastrichtian, and is a unit of the Salta Group. The fine-grained bioturbated sandstones of the formation were deposited in a fluvial to lacustrine coastal plain environment.

Dinosaur remains are among the fossils that have been recovered from the formation.

According to Frankfurt and Chiappe (1999), the Lecho Formation is composed of reddish sandstones. The Lecho is part of the Upper/Late Cretaceous Balbuena Subgroup (Salta Group), which is a near-border stratigraphic unit of the Andean sedimentary basin. Fossils from this formation include the titanosaur Saltasaurus along with a variety of avian and non-avian theropods.

== Fossil content ==
=== Dinosaurs ===
Dinosaurs from the Lecho Formation
Genus	Species	Location	Material	Notes	Images
Abelisauridae	Indeterminate	El Brete	Isolated teeth.	May represent more than one species of abelisaurid	
Elbretornis	E. bonapartei	El Brete	Scapula, partial coracoid, humerus, partial radius, partial ulna	An enantiornithine bird	
Enantiornis	E. leali	El Brete	Postcranial elements	An enantiornithine bird	
Euenantiornithes indet.	Indeterminate	El Brete	Partial right lower jaw	An enantiornithine bird	
Lectavis	L. bretincola	El Brete	Tarsometatarsus and tibiotarsus	An enantiornithine bird	
Martinavis	M. minor	El Brete	Partial humerus	An enantiornithine bird	
Martinavis	M. saltariensis	El Brete	Humerus	An enantiornithine bird	
Martinavis	M. vincei	El Brete	Humeri	An enantiornithine bird	
Martinavis	M. whetstonei	El Brete	Partial humerus	An enantiornithine bird	
Noasaurus	N. leali	El Brete	Isolated elements from the head (maxilla, quadrate), vertebral column (cervical and dorsal? vertebrae, ribs), manus (phalanx, unguals) and foot (metatarsal II).	A Noasaurid abelisaur	
Saltasaurus	S. loricatus	El Brete	"Partial skeletons of at least [six] individuals, including jaws and armor."	A saltasaurid titanosaur	
Soroavisaurus	S. australis	El Brete	Tarsometatarsus and phalanges.	An enantiornithine bird	
Yungavolucris	Y. brevipedalis	El Brete	Tarsometatarsi	An enantiornithine bird	

== See also ==
- List of dinosaur-bearing rock formations
- Marília Formation
