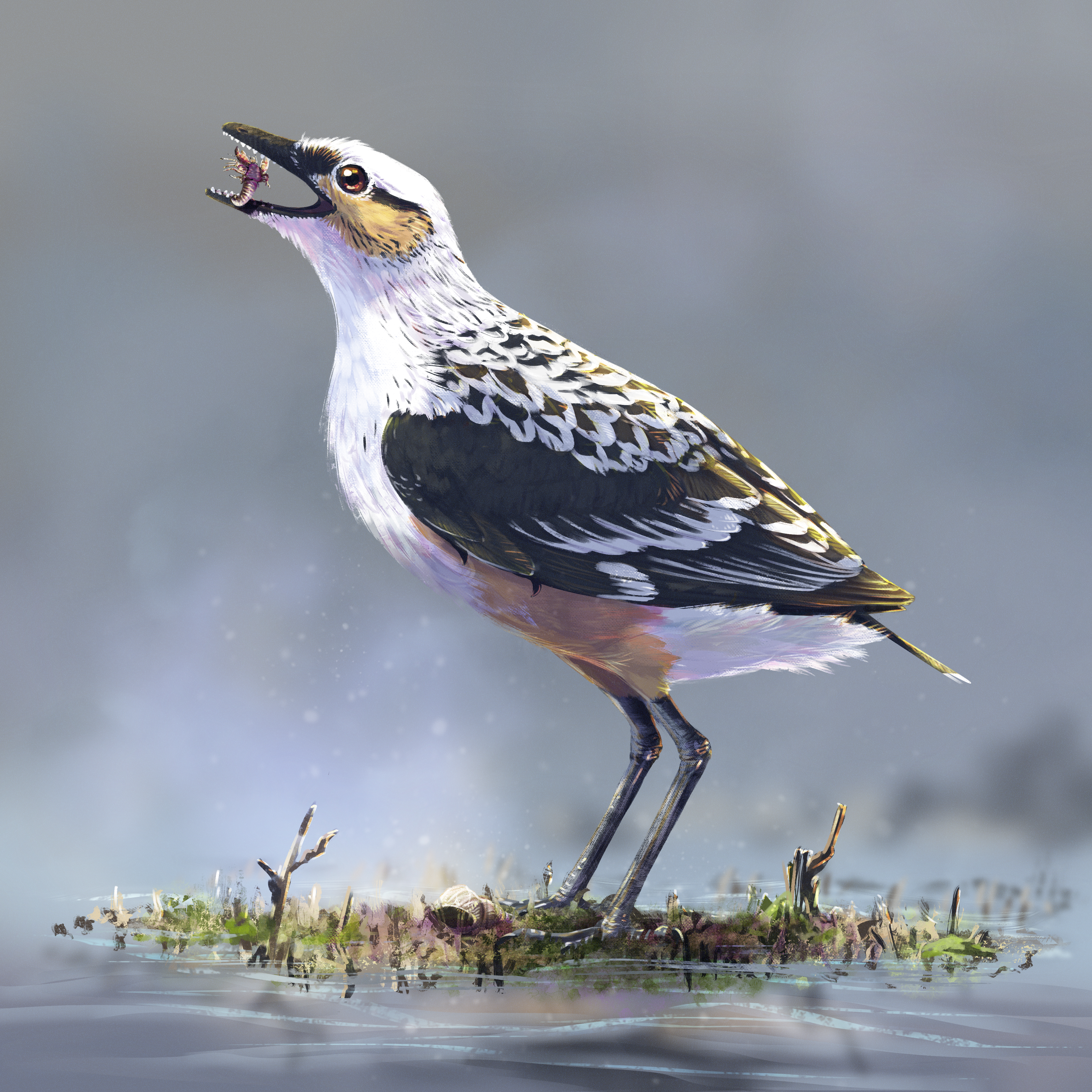
- Restoration of Lectavis bretincola predating upon a hermit crab

Scientific classification
- Kingdom: Animalia
- Phylum: Chordata
- Class: Reptilia
- Clade: Dinosauria
- Clade: Saurischia
- Clade: Theropoda
- Clade: Avialae
- Clade: †Enantiornithes
- Genus: †Lectavis; Chiappe 1993
- Species: †L. bretincola

Binomial name
- †Lectavis bretincola Chiappe 1993

= Lectavis =

Lectavis Temporal range: Maastrichtian ~70–68 Ma

Extinct genus of birds

Lectavis is a genus of enantiornithine avialan. Their fossil bones have been recovered from the Late Cretaceous (Maastrichtian, c. 70.6 – 66 mya) Lecho Formation at estancia El Brete, Argentina. The genus contains a single species, Lectavis bretincola.

== Etymology ==
Its naming means "Lecho Formation bird living at El Brete". Lectavis, after Latin lectus ("bed") = Spanish lecho + Latin avis, "bird". bretincola, after the type locality estancia El Brete + Latin incola, "inhabitant".

== Description ==
The presently only known fossil bones (PVL-4021-1) are mostly of the left tibiotarsus (lower leg) and tarsometatarsus (upper foot) of a single individual. L. bretincola was a sizeable bird, with a 16-centimetre (6.3 in) tibiotarsus and a tarsometatarsus which if complete must have been nearly 10 centimetres (3.9 in) long (Chiappe 1993). This remains indicate an animal with a length of 41 cm (16 in), hip height of 30 cm (12 in), and weight of 1.15 kg (2.5 lb).

It possesses a hypotarsus, which it evolved autapomorphically from modern birds, as it covers the upper end of the second, not the third, toe's bones. This structure serves to attach and arrest the posterior cruciate ligament, which in turn prevents the lower and upper leg from shifting out of position during walking.

== Classification ==
It was a rather advanced species of enantiornithine and possibly quite closely related to Enantiornis and Avisaurus, but more likely closer to other Euenantiornithes (Sanz et al. 1995). Its exact relationships, as with most enantiornithine birds, are unresolved however.

== Paleoecology ==
It appears that L. bretincola was a much more terrestrial species than its relative Yungavolucris brevipedalis which lived at the same time and place. Its habitat was a richly vegetated coastal area that was dotted by – possibly brackish – lakes or small rivers (Chiappe 1993), and it might thus be that the present species represents a case of parallel evolution with waders and similar semi-aquatic forms, or even a running bird similar to an oversized courser, and quite unlike anything living today.
