= List of Mesozoic bird-line archosaur genera (T–Z) =

This list of Mesozoic bird-line archosaur genera is a comprehensive listing of all Mesozoic genera that are included in the clade Avemetatarsalia (alternatively known as Pan-Aves), including dinosaurs, pterosaurs, silesaurids, lagerpetids, and more basal genera. The list includes all commonly accepted genera whose names begin with the letters T–Z. The list currently includes 268 genera.

== Scope and terminology ==
There is no official, canonical list of Mesozoic bird-line archosaur genera, but thorough attempts have been made for its various subgroups, such as George Olshevsky's Dinosaur Genera List, the book The Dinosauria, Mikko Haaramo's Phylogeny Archive, Mike Hanson's The Pterosauria, the Pterosaur Species List, Donald F. Glut's Dinosaurs: The Encyclopedia series, Holtz's list of Mesozoic dinosaurs, Molina-Perez & Larramendi's list of theropods, and Mickey Mortimer's Theropod Database. These lists have been supplemented with more recent publications to create this one.

- Genus: The generic name of the taxon, sourced to its description publication.
- Authors: Full names of the authors of the descriptions. This column can be sorted by last names.
- Year: The year when the descriptions were physically published. These are not necessarily the years the names became valid according to the rules of the International Commission on Zoological Nomenclature (ICZN).
- Formation: The geological formations each taxon was found in, along with their epoch and age. In the case of multiple formations, holotype localities are marked by an asterisk.
- Location: Every country and first-level subdivision the taxon was found in. In the case of multiple locations, holotype localities are marked by an asterisk.

== The list ==
Genus	Authors	Year	Formation	Location	Notes	Images
Tachiraptor	Max C. Langer; Ascanio D. Rincón; Jahandar Ramezani; Andrés Solórzano; Oliver W. M. Rauhut	2014	La Quinta Formation (Early Jurassic, Hettangian)	Venezuela (Táchira)	Closely related to ceratosaurs and tetanurans	
Tacuadactylus	Matías Soto; Felipe Montenegro; Pablo Toriño; Valeria Mesa; Daniel Perea	2021	Tacuarembó Formation (Late Jurassic, Kimmeridgian)	Uruguay (Tacuarembó)	Originally mistaken to be an early pristid fish	
Talarurus	Evgeny A. Maleev	1952	Bayanshiree Formation (Late Cretaceous, Cenomanian to Coniacian)	Mongolia (Dornogovi*; Ömnögovi)	Its tail club has been compared to a wicker basket	
Talenkauen	Fernando E. Novas; Andrea V. Cambiaso; Alfredo Ambrosio	2004	Cerro Fortaleza Formation (Late Cretaceous, Campanian to Maastrichtian)	Argentina (Santa Cruz)	May have practiced parental care as an adult and a hatchling have been found together	
Talos	Lindsay E. Zanno; David J. Varricchio; Patrick M. O'Connor; Alan L. Titus; Michael J. Knell	2011	Kaiparowits Formation (Late Cretaceous, Campanian)	United States (Utah)	The holotype specimen preserves a pathology on its sickle claw	
Tamarro	Albert G. Sellés; Bernat Vila; Stephen L. Brusatte; Philip J. Currie; Àngel Galobart	2021	Talarn Formation (Late Cretaceous, Maastrichtian)	Spain (Catalonia)	May have been closely related to Asian troodontids	
Tambatitanis	Haruo Saegusa; Tadahiro Ikeda	2014	Ohyamashimo Formation (Early Cretaceous, Albian)	Japan (Hyōgo)	Possessed disproportionately large chevrons	
Tangvayosaurus	Ronan Allain; Philippe Taquet; Bernard Battail; Jean Dejax; Philippe Richir; Monette Véran; Franck Limon-Duparcmeur; Renaud Vacant; Octávio Mateus; Phouvong Sayarath; Bounxou Khenthavong; Sitha Phouyavong	1999	Grès supérieurs Formation (Early Cretaceous, Aptian to Albian)	Laos (Savannakhet)	Closely related to Phuwiangosaurus	
Tanius	Carl Wiman	1929	Wangshi Group (Late Cretaceous, Campanian)	China (Shandong)	Today known from only a few bones; more fossils were once present but were not collected	
Tanycolagreus	Kenneth Carpenter; Clifford Miles; Karen Cloward	2005	Morrison Formation (Late Jurassic, Kimmeridgian to Tithonian)	United States (Colorado; Utah; Wyoming*)	Had a long, blunt snout	
Tanystrosuchus	Oskar Kuhn	1963	Löwenstein Formation (Late Triassic, Norian)	Germany (Baden-Württemberg)	The only known vertebra was once misidentified as a phytosaur	
Taohelong	Jingtao Yang; Hailu You; Daqing Li; Delai Kong	2013	Hekou Group (Early Cretaceous, Valanginian to Albian)	China (Gansu)	Possessed a sacral shield similar to that of Polacanthus	
Tapejara	Alexander W. A. Kellner	1989	Romualdo Formation (Early Cretaceous, Albian)	Brazil (Ceará)	Had a large crest on top of the head and a smaller one at the tip of the lower jaw	
Tapuiasaurus	Hussam Zaher; Diego Pol; Alberto B. Carvalho; Paulo M. Nascimento; Claudio Riccomini; Peter Larson; Rubén D. Juarez-Valieri; Ricardo Pires-Domingues; Nelson J. da Silva Jr.; Diogenes A. Campos	2011	Quiricó Formation (Early Cretaceous, Aptian)	Brazil (Minas Gerais)	One of the few titanosaurs from which a complete skull is known	
Tarascosaurus	Jean Le Loeuff; Eric Buffetaut	1991	Fuvelian Beds (Late Cretaceous, Campanian)	France (Provence-Alpes-Côte d'Azur)	If an abelisaurid it would be one of the few northern members of the group	
Tarbosaurus	Evgeny A. Maleev	1955	Nemegt Formation (Late Cretaceous, Maastrichtian)	Mongolia (Ömnögovi)	An apex predator that hunted large prey	
Tarchia	Teresa Maryańska	1977	Baruungoyot Formation (Late Cretaceous, Maastrichtian)*; Nemegt Formation (Late Cretaceous, Maastrichtian)	Mongolia (Ömnögovi)	One specimen preserves injuries on its ribs and tail, possibly from a fight with a member of its own kind	
Targaryendraco	Rodrigo V. Pêgas: Borja Holgado; Maria Eduarda C. Leal	2021	Stadthagen Formation (Early Cretaceous, Valanginian)	Germany (Lower Saxony)	Named after the House of Targaryen from the A Song of Ice and Fire series	
Tastavinsaurus	José I. Canudo; Rafael Royo-Torres; Gloria Cuenca-Bescós	2008	Forcall Formation (Early Cretaceous, Aptian); Xert Formation (Early Cretaceous, Barremian)	Spain (Aragon)	Could represent an obscure group of macronarians called Laurasiformes	
Tatankacephalus	William L. Parsons; Kristen M. Parsons	2009	Cloverly Formation (Early Cretaceous, Albian)	United States (Montana)	Retained premaxillary teeth in its upper jaws, a basal trait	
Tatankaceratops	Christopher J. Ott; Peter L. Larson	2010	Hell Creek Formation (Late Cretaceous, Maastrichtian)	United States (South Dakota)	Noted to possess a strange mix of features of both juvenile and adult Triceratops; may be a dwarf specimen of that genus or an individual that stopped growing prematurely	
Tataouinea	Federico Fanti; Andrea Cau; Mohsen Hassine; Michela Contessi	2013	Aïn el Guettar Formation (Early Cretaceous, Aptian to Albian)	Tunisia (Tataouinea)	Its bones were extensively pneumatized, supporting the theory that sauropods had bird-like respiratory systems	
Tatisaurus	David J. Simmons	1965	Lufeng Formation (Early Jurassic, Sinemurian)	China (Yunnan)	Potentially a basal thyreophoran	
Taurovenator	Matías J. Motta; Alexis Mauro Aranciaga Rolando; Sebastián Rozadilla; Federico L. Agnolín; Nicolás R. Chimento; Federico Brissón-Eglí; Fernando E. Novas	2016	Huincul Formation (Late Cretaceous, Cenomanian to Turonian)	Argentina (Río Negro)	Originally known from a single postorbital	
Tawa	Sterling J. Nesbitt; Nathan D. Smith; Randall B. Irmis; Alan H. Turner; Alex Downs; Mark A. Norell	2009	Chinle Formation (Late Triassic, Norian to Rhaetian)	United States (New Mexico)	Well-preserved but inconsistent in phylogenetic placement	
Tazoudasaurus	Ronan Allain; Najat Aquesbi; Jean Dejax; Christian Meyer; Michel Monbaron; Christian Montenat; Philippe Richir; Mohammed Rochdy; Dale A. Russell; Philippe Taquet	2004	Azilal Formation (Early Jurassic, Toarcian)	Morocco (Drâa-Tafilalet)	One of the few Early Jurassic sauropods known from reasonably complete remains	
Technosaurus	Sankar Chatterjee	1984	Cooper Canyon Formation (Late Triassic, Norian)	United States (Texas)	Originally, and sometimes still, thought to be a basal ornithischian dinosaur	
Tehuelchesaurus	Thomas H. Rich; Patricia Vickers-Rich; Olga Giménez; N. R. Cúneo; Pablo F. Puerta; Raul Vacca	1999	Cañadón Calcáreo Formation (Late Jurassic, Oxfordian to Tithonian)	Argentina (Chubut)	Preserves impressions of scaly skin	
Teinurosaurus	Franz Nopcsa	1928	Mont-Lambert Formation (Late Jurassic, Tithonian)	France (Hauts-de-France)	A poorly known possible theropod	
Teleocrater	Sterling J. Nesbitt: Richard J. Butler; Martín D. Ezcurra; Paul M. Barrett; Michelle R. Stocker; Kenneth D. Angielczyk; Roger M. H. Smith; Christian A. Sidor; Grzegorz Niedźwiedzki; Andrey G. Sennikov; Alan J. Charig	2017	Manda Formation (Middle Triassic to Late Triassic, Anisian to Carnian)	Tanzania (Ruvuma)	Represents a novel group of basal bird-line archosaurs called aphanosaurians	
Telmatornis	Othniel C. Marsh	1870	Hornerstown Formation (Late Cretaceous to Paleocene, Maastrichtian to Danian)	United States (New Jersey)	Has been compared to rallids and burhinids	
Telmatosaurus	Franz Nopcsa	1903	Sânpetru Formation (Late Cretaceous, Maastrichtian)	Romania (Hunedoara)	One specimen preserves a facial deformity caused by an ameloblastoma	
Tendaguria	José F. Bonaparte; Wolf-Dieter Heinrich; Rupert Wild	2000	Tendaguru Formation (Late Jurassic, Tithonian)	Tanzania (Lindi)	The first definitive turiasaur known from Africa	
Tendaguripterus	David M. Unwin; Wolf-Dieter Heinrich	1999	Tendaguru Formation (Late Jurassic, Kimmeridgian)	Tanzania (Lindi)	May be a close relative of dsungaripterids	
Tengrisaurus	Alexander O. Averianov; Pavel P. Skutschas	2017	Murtoi Formation (Early Cretaceous, Valanginian to Hauterivian)	Russia (Buryatia)	Closely related to South American titanosaurs	
Tenontosaurus	John H. Ostrom	1970	Cloverly Formation (Early Cretaceous, Albian); Twin Mountains Formation (Early Cretaceous, Aptian)	United States (Montana*; Texas; Wyoming)	Remains of this genus are often found associated with skeletons of Deinonychus	
Teratophoneus	Thomas D. Carr; Thomas E. Williamson; Brooks B. Britt; Ken Stadtman	2011	Kaiparowits Formation (Late Cretaceous, Campanian)	United States (Utah)	Its snout was shorter and deeper than those of other tyrannosaurids	
Terminocavus	Denver W. Fowler; Elizabeth A. Freedman Fowler	2020	Kirtland Formation (Late Cretaceous, Campanian)	United States (New Mexico)	Had a teardrop-shaped hole on the top of its frill which was almost closed off by a pair of epoccipitals	
Tethydraco	Nicholas R. Longrich; David M. Martill; Brian Andres	2018	Couche III (Late Cretaceous, Maastrichtian)	Morocco (Béni Mellal-Khénifra)	Has been considered synonymous with Phosphatodraco, but this has been disputed	
Tethyshadros	Fabio M. Dalla Vecchia	2009	Calcare di Aurisina (Late Cretaceous, Santonian to Campanian)	Italy (Friuli-Venezia Giulia)	Had limbs adapted for high speed but were too short for running	
Teviornis	Evgeny N. Kurochkin; Gareth J. Dyke; Alexander A. Karhu	2002	Nemegt Formation (Late Cretaceous, Maastrichtian)	Mongolia (Ömnögovi)	A presbyornithid and one of the oldest known neognaths	
Texacephale	Nicholas R. Longrich; Julia Sankey; Darren Tanke	2010	Aguja Formation (Late Cretaceous, Campanian)	United States (Texas)	Might represent a specimen of Stegoceras	
Texasetes	Walter P. Coombs Jr.	1995	Paw Paw Formation (Early Cretaceous, Albian)	United States (Texas)	Potentially synonymous with Pawpawsaurus	
Thalassodromeus	Alexander W. A. Kellner; Diogenes A. Campos	2002	Romualdo Formation (Early Cretaceous, Albian)	Brazil (Ceará)	Although named after the skim-feeding hypothesis, this is extremely unlikely and it is more probable that it was a terrestrial stalker	
Thanatosdrakon	Leonardo D. Ortiz David; Bernardo J. González Riga; Alexander W. A. Kellner	2022	Plottier Formation (Late Cretaceous, Coniacian to Santonian)	Argentina (Mendoza)	The largest pterosaur known from South America	
Thanatotheristes	Jared T. Voris; François Therrien; Darla K. Zelenitsky; Caleb M. Brown	2020	Foremost Formation (Late Cretaceous, Campanian)	Canada (Alberta)	A close relative of Daspletosaurus	
Thanos	Rafael Delcourt; Fabiano Vidoi Iori	2020	São José do Rio Preto Formation (Late Cretaceous, Santonian to Campanian)	Brazil (São Paulo)	The generic name honors the Marvel Comics villain Thanos	
Thapunngaka	Timothy M. Richards; Paul E. Stumkat; Steven W. Salisbury	2021	Toolebuc Formation (Early Cretaceous, Albian)	Australia (Queensland)	The largest known pterosaur from Australia	
Tharosaurus	Sunil Bajpai; Debajit Datta; Pragya Pandey; Triparna Ghosh; Krishna Kumar; Debasish Bhattacharya	2023	Jaisalmer Formation (Middle Jurassic to Late Jurassic, Bajocian to Oxfordian)	India (Rajasthan)	Although originally described as the oldest neosauropod, it may actually be outside that clade	
Thecocoelurus	Friedrich von Huene	1923	Wessex Formation (Early Cretaceous, Berriasian to Barremian)	England (Isle of Wight)	Has been assigned to a variety of theropod groups throughout history	
Thecodontosaurus	Henry Riley; Samuel Stutchbury	1836	Magnesian Conglomerate (Late Triassic, Norian to Rhaetian)	England (Bristol)	Could have been an extremely fast bipedal runner	
Thecospondylus	Harry G. Seeley	1882	Wealden Group (Early Cretaceous, Valanginian to Hauterivian)	England (Kent)	Indeterminate within Dinosauria	
Theiophytalia	Kathleen Brill; Kenneth Carpenter	2007	Purgatoire Formation (Early Cretaceous, Aptian to Albian)	United States (Colorado)	Only known from a skull originally referred to Camptosaurus	
Therizinosaurus	Evgeny A. Maleev	1954	Nemegt Formation (Late Cretaceous, Maastrichtian)	Mongolia (Ömnögovi)	Possessed extremely elongated and stiffened hand claws	
Thescelosaurus	Charles W. Gilmore	1913	Frenchman Formation (Late Cretaceous, Maastrichtian); Hell Creek Formation (Late Cretaceous, Maastrichtian); Lance Formation (Late Cretaceous, Maastrichtian)*; Scollard Formation (Late Cretaceous, Maastrichtian)	Canada (Alberta; Saskatchewan); United States (Montana; South Dakota; Wyoming*)	One specimen was originally considered to have preserved its heart, although this was later found to be a mineral concretion	
Thespesius	Joseph Leidy	1856	Lance Formation (Late Cretaceous, Maastrichtian)	United States (South Dakota)	Once suggested to be a possible Miocene mammal	
Thyreosaurus	Omar Zafaty; Mostafa Oukassou; Facundo Riguetti; Julio Company; Saad Bendrioua; Rodolphe Tabuce; André Charrière; Xabier Pereda-Suberbiola	2024	El Mers III Formation (Middle Jurassic, Bathonian to Callovian)	Morocco (Fez-Meknes)	May have possessed recumbent dermal armor, an unusual feature among stegosaurs	
Tiamat	Paulo V. L. G. C. Pereira; Kamila L. N. Bandeira; Luciano S. Vidal; Theo B. Ribeiro; Carlos R. A. Candeiro; Lilian P. Bergqvist	2024	Açu Formation (Early Cretaceous to Late Cretaceous, Albian to Cenomanian)	Brazil (Ceará)	Named after a Mesopotamian goddess	
Tianchisaurus	Zhiming Dong	1993	Toutunhe Formation (Late Jurassic, Oxfordian to Kimmeridgian)	China (Xinjiang)	Its description uses the spellings Tianchisaurus and Tianchiasaurus interchangeably, but the former is correct	
Tianyulong	Xiaoting Zheng; Hailu You; Xing Xu; Zhiming Dong	2009	Tiaojishan Formation (Late Jurassic, Oxfordian)	China (Liaoning)	Preserves impressions of long bristles down its back, tail and neck	
Tianyuornis	Xiaoting Zheng; Jingmai K. O'Connor; Xiaoli Wang; Xiaomei Zhang	2014	Yixian Formation (Early Cretaceous, Barremian)	China (Inner Mongolia)	Confirms the presence of teeth in hongshanornithids	
Tianyuraptor	Xiaoting Zheng; Xing Xu; Hailu You; Qi Zhao; Zhiming Dong	2010	Yixian Formation (Early Cretaceous, Barremian)	China (Liaoning)	Combines features of both northern and southern dromaeosaurids	
Tianzhenosaurus	Qiqing Pang; Zhengwu Cheng	1998	Huiquanpu Formation (Late Cretaceous, Campanian to Maastrichtian)	China (Shanxi)	Has been suggested to be synonymous with Saichania, but the discovery of the second species, T. chengi, casts doubt on this interpretation	
Tichosteus	Edward D. Cope	1877	Morrison Formation (Late Jurassic, Kimmeridgian to Tithonian)	United States (Colorado)	Two species have been named, both from isolated vertebrae	
Tienshanosaurus	Zhongjian Yang	1937	Shishugou Formation (Middle Jurassic to Late Jurassic, Callovian to Oxfordian)	China (Xinjiang)	Large but basal for a mamenchisaurid	
Tietasaura	Kamila L. N. Bandeira; Bruno A. Navarro; Rodrigo V. Pêgas; Natan S. Brilhante; Arthur S. Brum; Lucy G. de Souza; Rafael C. da Silva; Valéria Gallo	2025	Marfim Formation (Early Cretaceous, Valanginian to Hauterivian)	Brazil (Bahia)	The first unambiguous ornithischian genus described from Brazil	
Timimus	Thomas H. Rich; Patricia Vickers-Rich	1994	Eumeralla Formation (Early Cretaceous, Aptian to Albian)	Australia (Victoria)	Potentially a tyrannosauroid; if so, it would be one of the few Gondwanan members of that group	
Timurlengia	Stephen L. Brusatte; Alexander O. Averianov; Hans-Dieter Sues; Amy Muir; Ian B. Butler	2016	Bissekty Formation (Late Cretaceous, Turonian)	Uzbekistan (Navoiy)	Its inner ear was specialized for detecting low-frequency sounds	
Tingmiatornis	Richard K. Bono; Julia Clarke; John A. Tardund; Donald Brinkman	2016	Unnamed Canadian formation (Late Cretaceous, Turonian)	Canada (Nunavut)	One of the northernmost primitive birds known	
Titanoceratops	Nicholas R. Longrich	2011	Kirtland Formation (Late Cretaceous, Campanian)	United States (New Mexico)	Potentially a large, old specimen of Pentaceratops	
Titanomachya	Agustín Pérez-Moreno; Leonardo Salgado; José L. Carballido; Alejandro Otero; Diego Pol	2025	La Colonia Formation (Late Cretaceous, Maastrichtian)	Argentina (Chubut)	The morphology of its astragalus is intermediate between members of the Colossosauria and Saltasauroidea	
Titanosaurus	Richard Lydekker	1877	Lameta Formation (Late Cretaceous, Maastrichtian)	India (Madhya Pradesh)	Although only known from a few bones, this genus is the namesake of the Titanosauria and the Titanosauriformes	
Tlatolophus	Angel A. Ramírez-Velasco; Felisa J. Aguilar; René Hernández-Rivera; José Luis Gudiño Maussán; Marisol L. Rodríguez; Jesús Alvarado-Ortega	2021	Cerro del Pueblo Formation (Late Cretaceous, Campanian)	Mexico (Coahuila)	Possessed a short, broad crest resembling an inverted comma	
Tochisaurus	Sergei M. Kurzanov; Halszka Osmólska	1991	Nemegt Formation (Late Cretaceous, Maastrichtian)	Mongolia (Ömnögovi)	Known from only a single metatarsus	
Tonganosaurus	Kui Li; Chunyan Yang; Jian Liu; Zhengxin Wang	2010	Yimen Formation (Early Jurassic, Pliensbachian)	China (Sichuan)	Potentially the oldest known mamenchisaurid	
Tongtianlong	Junchang Lü; Rongjun Chen; Stephen L. Brusatte; Yangxiao Zhu; Caizhi Shen	2016	Nanxiong Formation (Late Cretaceous, Maastrichtian)	China (Jiangxi)	The pose of the holotype suggests it died while trying to free itself from mud	
Tornieria	Richard Sternfeld	1911	Tendaguru Formation (Late Jurassic, Kimmeridgian to Tithonian)	Tanzania (Lindi)	Has been assigned to different genera throughout its history	
Torosaurus	Othniel C. Marsh	1891	Hell Creek Formation (Late Cretaceous, Maastrichtian); Lance Formation (Late Cretaceous, Maastrichtian)*; Laramie Formation (Late Cretaceous, Maastrichtian)	United States (Colorado; Montana; North Dakota; South Dakota; Wyoming*)	Once believed to be potentially synonymous with Triceratops	
Torotix	Pierce Brodkorb	1963	Lance Formation (Late Cretaceous, Maastrichtian)	United States (Wyoming)	Only known from a partial humerus	
Torukjara	Rodrigo V. Pêgas	2025	Rio Paraná Formation (Early Cretaceous, Barremian to Albian)	Brazil (Paraná)	Originally believed to be specimens of Caiuajara	
Torvosaurus	Peter M. Galton; James A. Jensen	1979	Lourinhã Formation (Late Jurassic, Kimmeridgian); Morrison Formation (Late Jurassic, Kimmeridgian)	Portugal (Lisbon); United States (Colorado*; Wyoming)	Several species, many of them unnamed, have been found in Europe, South America, and possibly Africa	
Tototlmimus	Claudia I. Serrano-Brañas; Esperanza Torres-Rodríguez; Paola C. Reyes-Luna; Ixchel González-Ramírez; Carlos González-León	2016	Packard Formation (Late Cretaceous, Campanian)	Mexico (Sonora)	The southernmost ornithomimid known from North America	
Trachodon	Joseph Leidy	1856	Judith River Formation (Late Cretaceous, Campanian)	United States (Montana)	Several remains assigned to this genus actually belong to other taxa, most notably Edmontosaurus	
Tralkasaurus	Mauricio A. Cerroni; Matías J. Motta; Federico L. Agnolín; Alexis Mauro Aranciaga Rolando; Federico Brissón-Egli; Fernando E. Novas	2020	Huincul Formation (Late Cretaceous, Cenomanian to Turonian)	Argentina (Río Negro)	Exhibits a conflicting blend of characteristics from basal and derived abelisauroids	
Transylvanosaurus	Felix J. Augustin; Dylan Bastiaans; Mihai D. Dumbravă; Zoltán Csiki-Sava	2022	Pui Beds (Late Cretaceous, Maastrichtian)	Romania (Hunedoara)	Had an unusually wide skull compared to other rhabdodontids	
Tratayenia	Juan D. Porfiri; Rubén D. Juárez Valieri; Domenica D. dos Santos; Matthew C. Lamanna	2018	Bajo de la Carpa Formation (Late Cretaceous, Santonian)	Argentina (Neuquén)	One of the youngest known megaraptorans	
Traukutitan	Rubén D. Juárez Valieri; Jorge O. Calvo	2011	Bajo de la Carpa Formation (Late Cretaceous, Santonian)	Argentina (Neuquén)	Retained basal features in its caudal vertebrae despite its late age	
Triceratops	Othniel C. Marsh	1889	Evanston Formation (Late Cretaceous, Maastrichtian); Hell Creek Formation (Late Cretaceous, Maastrichtian); Lance Formation (Late Cretaceous, Maastrichtian)*; Laramie Formation (Late Cretaceous, Maastrichtian); Scollard Formation (Late Cretaceous, Maastrichtian)	Canada (Alberta); United States (Colorado; Montana; North Dakota; South Dakota; Wyoming*)	A common ceratopsid with long brow horns and a short nasal horn	
Trierarchuncus	Denver W. Fowler; John P. Wilson; Elizabeth A. Freedman Fowler; Christopher R. Noto; Daniel Anduza; John R. Horner	2020	Hell Creek Formation (Late Cretaceous, Maastrichtian)	United States (Montana)	Known from remains of different sizes which depict how the claws of alvarezsaurids grew more hooked as they aged	
Trigonosaurus	Diogenes A. Campos; Alexander W. A. Kellner; Reinaldo J. Bertini; Rodrigo M. Santucci	2005	Serra da Galga Formation (Late Cretaceous, Maastrichtian)	Brazil (Minas Gerais)	Potentially synonymous with Baurutitan	
Trimucrodon	Richard A. Thulborn	1973	Lourinhã Formation (Late Jurassic, Kimmeridgian)	Portugal (Lisbon)	Possessed wedge-shaped teeth	
Trinisaura	Rodolfo A. Coria; Juan J. Moly; Marcelo Reguero; Sergio Santillana; Sergio Marenssi	2013	Snow Hill Island Formation (Late Cretaceous, Maastrichtian)	Antarctica (Argentine Antarctica; British Antarctic Territory; Chilean Antarctic Territory)	The first ornithopod named from Antarctica	
Triunfosaurus	Ismar S. Carvalho; Leonardo Salgado; Rafael M. Lindoso; Hermínio I. de Araújo-Júnior; Francisco C. C. Nogueira; José A. Soares	2017	Rio Piranhas Formation (Early Cretaceous, Berriasian to Hauterivian)	Brazil (Paraíba)	Originally described as a titanosaur but similarities have been noted with basal somphospondylians	
Troodon	Joseph Leidy	1856	Judith River Formation (Late Cretaceous, Campanian)	United States (Montana)	Usually seen as a dubious, undiagnostic genus, but a later study recommends the formal designation of a neotype to preserve its validity	
Tropeognathus	Peter Wellnhofer	1987	Romualdo Formation (Early Cretaceous, Albian)	Brazil (Ceará)	One of the largest known toothed pterosaurs	
Tsaagan	Mark A. Norell; James M. Clark; Alan H. Turner; Peter J. Makovicky; Rinchen Barsbold; Timothy B. Rowe	2006	Djadokhta Formation (Late Cretaceous, Campanian)	Mongolia (Ömnögovi)	Very similar to Velociraptor but differs in some features of the skull	
Tsagantegia	Tatyana A. Tumanova	1993	Bayanshiree Formation (Late Cretaceous, Cenomanian to Coniacian)	Mongolia (Dornogovi)	Had a long, shovel-shaped snout which may indicate a browsing lifestyle	
Tsintaosaurus	Zhongjian Yang	1958	Wangshi Group (Late Cretaceous, Campanian)	China (Shandong)	Originally mistakenly believed to have possessed a unicorn horn-like crest	
Tuebingosaurus	Omar R. Regalado-Fernández; Ingmar Werneburg	2022	Trossingen Formation (Late Triassic, Norian to Rhaetian)	Germany (Baden-Württemberg)	Although originally assigned to Plateosaurus, it contains several features that point to a more derived position	
Tugulusaurus	Zhiming Dong	1973	Lianmuqin Formation (Early Cretaceous, Aptian to Albian)	China (Xinjiang)	Potentially an early, Xiyunykus-grade alvarezsaurian	
Tuojiangosaurus	Zhiming Dong; Xuanmin Li; Shiwu Zhou; Chang Yijong	1977	Shangshaximiao Formation (Late Jurassic, Oxfordian to Tithonian)	China (Sichuan)	Possessed two rows of tall, pointed plates, thickened in the center as if they were modified spikes	
Tupandactylus	Alexander W. A. Kellner; Diogenes A. Campos	2007	Crato Formation (Early Cretaceous, Aptian)	Brazil (Ceará)	Had the large triangular crest commonly seen in depictions of Tapejara, the taxon to which its remains were originally assigned	
Tupuxuara	Alexander W. A. Kellner; Diogenes A. Campos	1988	Romualdo Formation (Early Cretaceous, Albian)	Brazil (Ceará)	Two species are known, both with slightly different crest shapes	
Turanoceratops	Lev A. Nessov; L. F. Kaznyshkina; G. O. Cherepanov	1989	Bissekty Formation (Late Cretaceous, Turonian)	Uzbekistan (Navoiy)	Had a pair of brow horns like ceratopsids but was likely not a member of that family	
Turiasaurus	Rafael Royo-Torres; Alberto Cobos; Luis Alcalá	2006	Villar del Arzobispo Formation (Late Jurassic to Early Cretaceous, Tithonian to Berriasian)	Spain (Aragon)	Extremely large despite not being a member of Neosauropoda	
Tylocephale	Teresa Maryańska; Halszka Osmólska	1974	Baruungoyot Formation (Late Cretaceous, Maastrichtian)	Mongolia (Ömnögovi)	Only known from a partial skull but it is enough to tell that it had a remarkably tall dome	
Tyrannomimus	Soki Hattori; Masateru Shibata; Soichiro Kawabe; Takuya Imai; Hiroshi Nishi; Yoichi Azuma	2023	Kitadani Formation (Early Cretaceous, Aptian)	Japan (Fukui)	Its ilium is remarkably similar to that of the supposed tyrannosauroid Aviatyrannis	
Tyrannosaurus	Henry F. Osborn	1905	Frenchman Formation (Late Cretaceous, Maastrichtian); Hell Creek Formation (Late Cretaceous, Maastrichtian)*; Lance Formation (Late Cretaceous, Maastrichtian); North Horn Formation (Late Cretaceous, Maastrichtian); Willow Creek Formation (Late Cretaceous, Maastrichtian)	Canada (Alberta; Saskatchewan); United States (Montana*; North Dakota; South Dakota; Utah; Wyoming)	The last, largest, and most well-known tyrannosaurid	
Tyrannotitan	Fernando E. Novas; Silvina de Valais; Patricia Vickers-Rich; Thomas H. Rich	2005	Cerro Barcino Formation (Early Cretaceous to Late Cretaceous, Aptian to Cenomanian)	Argentina (Chubut)	Unlike other carcharodontosaurids, its sacral and caudal vertebrae were not pneumatic	
Tytthostonyx	Storrs L. Olson; David C. Parris	1987	Hornerstown Formation (Late Cretaceous to Paleocene, Maastrichtian to Danian)	United States (New Jersey)	Possibly closely related to procellariforms	
Uberabatitan	Leonardo Salgado; Ismar S. Carvalho	2008	Serra da Galga Formation (Late Cretaceous, Maastrichtian)	Brazil (Minas Gerais)	Several individuals are known, some of which are very large	
Udanoceratops	Sergei M. Kurzanov	1992	Djadokhta Formation (Late Cretaceous, Campanian)	Mongolia (Ömnögovi)	The largest known leptoceratopsid	
Udelartitan	Matías Soto; José L. Carballido; Max C. Langer; Julian C.G. Silva Junior; Felipe Montenegro; Daniel Perea	2024	Guichón Formation (Early Cretaceous to Late Cretaceous, Aptian to Santonian)	Uruguay (Paysandú)	Known from at least two fragmentary specimens	
Uktenadactylus	Taissa Rodrigues; Alexander W. A. Kellner	2009	Paw Paw Formation (Early Cretaceous, Albian)*; Wessex Formation (Early Cretaceous, Barremian)	England (Isle of Wight); United States (Texas*)	One species is much larger than the other	
Ultrasaurus	Hang-Mook Kim	1983	Gugyedong Formation (Early Cretaceous, Aptian to Albian)	South Korea (North Gyeongsang)	Described as very large but this may be due to misidentification of a bone	
Ulughbegsaurus	Kohei Tanaka; Otabek Ulugbek Ogli Anvarov; Darla K. Zelenitsky; Akhmadjon S. Ahmedshaev; Yoshitsugu Kobayashi	2021	Bissekty Formation (Late Cretaceous, Turonian)	Uzbekistan (Navoiy)	A 2022 study suggested this taxon could be a large-bodied dromaeosaurid, although the discovery of a fragmentary right maxilla assigned to the genus suggests it is very likely a member of the family Carcharodontosauridae	
Unaysaurus	Luciano A. Leal; Sergio A.K. de Azevedo; Alexander W. A. Kellner; Átila A. S. Da Rosa	2004	Caturrita Formation (Late Triassic, Norian)	Brazil (Rio Grande do Sul)	Described as the first plateosaurid-grade sauropodomorph from Brazil	
Unenlagia	Fernando E. Novas; Pablo F. Puerta	1997	Portezuelo Formation (Late Cretaceous, Turonian to Coniacian)	Argentina (Neuquén)	Could potentially be adapted for flapping due to the structure of its shoulder girdle	
Unescoceratops	Michael J. Ryan; David C. Evans; Philip J. Currie; Caleb M. Brown; Don Brinkman	2012	Dinosaur Park Formation (Late Cretaceous, Campanian)	Canada (Alberta)	Had the roundest teeth of any known leptoceratopsid	
Unquillosaurus	Jaime E. Powell	1979	Los Blanquitos Formation (Late Cretaceous, Campanian to Maastrichtian)	Argentina (Salta)	Has been suggested to be a dromaeosaurid or a carcharodontosaurid	
Unwindia	David M. Martill	2011	Romualdo Formation (Early Cretaceous, Albian)	Brazil (Ceará)	Has been suggested to be a lonchodectid, but this is not widely accepted	
Urbacodon	Alexander O. Averianov; Hans-Dieter Sues	2007	Dzharakuduk Formation (Late Cretaceous, Turonian)*; Iren Dabasu Formation (Late Cretaceous, Turonian to Maastrichtian)	China (Inner Mongolia); Uzbekistan (Navoiy*)	The U. itemirensis holotype preserves a gap separating the eight rear teeth from the rest of its teeth	
Utahceratops	Scott D. Sampson; Mark A. Loewen; Andrew A. Farke; Eric M. Roberts; Catherine A. Forster; Joshua A. Smith; Alan L. Titus	2010	Kaiparowits Formation (Late Cretaceous, Campanian)	United States (Utah)	Almost the entire skeleton is known, including the skull	
Utahdactylus	Stephen A. Czerkas; Debra L. Mickelson	2002	Morrison Formation (Late Jurassic, Kimmeridgian to Tithonian)	United States (Utah)	Has been considered an indeterminate diapsid	
Utahraptor	James I. Kirkland; Robert Gaston; Donald Burge	1993	Cedar Mountain Formation (Early Cretaceous, Berriasian to Valanginian)	United States (Utah)	Very large and powerfully built	
Uteodon	Andrew T. McDonald	2011	Morrison Formation (Late Jurassic, Kimmeridgian to Tithonian)	United States (Utah)	May be a species of Camptosaurus, with a referred braincase being from Dryosaurus	
Vagaceratops	Scott D. Sampson; Mark A. Loewen; Andrew A. Farke; Eric M. Roberts; Catherine A. Forster; Joshua A. Smith; Alan L. Titus	2010	Dinosaur Park Formation (Late Cretaceous, Campanian)	Canada (Alberta)	Possessed a row of fused epoccipitals folding over the top of the frill	
Vahiny	Kristina Curry Rogers; Jeffrey A. Wilson	2014	Maevarano Formation (Late Cretaceous, Maastrichtian)	Madagascar (Boeny)	May have been a rare component of its habitat due to the paucity of its remains	
Valdoraptor	George Olshevsky	1991	Tunbridge Wells Sand Formation (Early Cretaceous, Valanginian)	England (West Sussex)	Potentially a junior synonym of Thecocoelurus	
Valdosaurus	Peter M. Galton	1977	Wessex Formation (Early Cretaceous, Barremian)	England (Isle of Wight)	Large and similar to Dryosaurus	
Vallibonavenatrix	Elisabete Malafaia; José M. Gasulla; Fernando Escaso; Iván Narváez; José Luis Sanz; Francisco Ortega	2020	Arcillas de Morella Formation (Early Cretaceous, Barremian)	Spain (Valencia)	One of the most complete spinosaurids known from Iberia	
Variraptor	Jean Le Loeuff; Eric Buffetaut	1998	Argiles et Grès à Reptiles Formation (Late Cretaceous, Campanian)	France (Provence-Alpes-Côte d'Azur)	May be closely related to Bambiraptor	
Vayuraptor	Adun Samathi; Phornphen Chanthasit; P. Martin Sander	2019	Sao Khua Formation (Early Cretaceous, Valanginian to Hauterivian)	Thailand (Nong Bua Lamphu)	Either ancestral to megaraptorans or an early member of the group	
Vectaerovenator	Chris T. Barker; Darren Naish; Claire E. Clarkin; Paul Farrell; Gabriel Hullmann; James Lockyer; Philipp Schneider; Robin K. C. Ward; Neil J. Gostling	2020	Ferruginous Sands (Early Cretaceous, Aptian)	England (Isle of Wight)	Only known from four vertebrae but are distinct enough to be classified as their own genus	
Vectidraco	Darren Naish; Martin Simpson; Gareth Dyke	2013	Lower Greensand Group (Early Cretaceous, Aptian to Albian)	England (Isle of Wight)	Specific name honors Daisy Morris, who found the holotype when she was only four years old	
Vectidromeus	Nicholas R. Longrich; David M. Martill; Martin Munt; Mick Green; Mark Penn; Shaun Smith	2024	Wessex Formation (Early Cretaceous, Barremian)	England (Isle of Wight)	Originally described as a relative of the coeval Hypsilophodon, but a subsequent analysis suggests possible dryosaurid affinities for this genus	
Vectipelta	Stuart Pond; Sarah-Jane Strachan; Thomas J. Raven; Martin I. Simpson; Kirsty Morgan; Susannah C.R. Maidment	2023	Wessex Formation (Early Cretaceous, Barremian)	England (Isle of Wight)	May have been more closely related to Asian ankylosaurs than to European ones	
Vectiraptor	Nicholas R. Longrich; David M. Martill; Megan L. Jacobs	2022	Wessex Formation (Early Cretaceous, Barremian)	England (Isle of Wight)	Shares some features with North American dromaeosaurids	
Vegavis	Julia A. Clarke: Claudia P. Tambussi; Jorge I. Noriega; Gregory M. Erickson; Richard A. Ketcham	2005	López de Bertodano Formation (Late Cretaceous to Paleocene, Maastrichtian to Danian)	Antarctica (Argentine Antarctica; British Antarctic Territory; Chilean Antarctic Territory)	One specimen preserves a syrinx	
Velafrons	Terry A. Gates; Scott D. Sampson; Carlos R. Delgado De Jesús; Lindsay E. Zanno; David A. Eberth; René Hernández-Rivera; Martha C. Aguillón Martínez; James I. Kirkland	2007	Cerro del Pueblo Formation (Late Cretaceous, Campanian)	Mexico (Coahuila)	May have had elongated neural spines similar to those of Hypacrosaurus altispinus	
Velocipes	Friedrich von Huene	1932	Lissauer Breccia (Late Triassic, Norian)	Poland (Opole)	Has been considered a dubious, indeterminate vertebrate	
Velociraptor	Henry F. Osborn	1924	Djadokhta Formation (Late Cretaceous, Campanian)	Mongolia (Ömnögovi)	One potential specimen preserves quill knobs	
Velocisaurus	José F. Bonaparte	1991	Bajo de la Carpa Formation (Late Cretaceous, Santonian)	Argentina (Neuquén)	Unusually, its third metatarsal is the thickest, which may be an adaptation to running	
Venenosaurus	Virginia Tidwell; Kenneth Carpenter; Susanne Meyer	2001	Cedar Mountain Formation (Early Cretaceous, Barremian to Aptian)	United States (Utah)	Its skeleton has traits of both titanosaurs and more basal macronarians	
Venetoraptor	Rodrigo T. Müller; Martín D. Ezcurra; Mauricio S. Garcia; Federico L. Agnolín; Michelle R. Stocker; Fernando E. Novas; Marina B. Soares; Alexander W. A. Kellner; Sterling J. Nesbitt	2023	Candelária Sequence (Late Triassic, Carnian)	Brazil (Rio Grande do Sul)	Had extremely large claws on its four fingers as well as a hooked beak	
Vescornis	Fucheng Zhang; Per G. P. Ericson; Zhonghe Zhou	2004	Huajiying Formation (Early Cretaceous, Hauterivian)	China (Hebei)	A small and short-snouted enantiornithean which may be synonymous with Jibeinia	
Vesperopterylus	Junchang Lü: Qingjin Meng; Baopeng Wang; Di Liu; Caizhi Shen; Yuguang Zhang	2018	Jiufotang Formation (Early Cretaceous, Aptian)	China (Liaoning)	Had a reversed first toe which suggests an arboreal lifestyle	
Vespersaurus	Max C. Langer; Neurides de Oliveira Martins; Paulo César Manzig; Gabriel de Souza Ferreira; Júlio César de Almeida Marsola; Edison Fortes; Rosana Lima; Lucas Cesar Frediani Sant'Ana; Luciano da Silva Vidal; Rosangela Honório da Silva Lorençato; Martín D. Ezcurra	2019	Rio Paraná Formation (Early Cretaceous, Barremian to Albian)	Brazil (Paraná)	Possessed raised claws on its second and fourth toes, making it functionally monodactyl, a possible adaptation to its desert habitat	
Veterupristisaurus	Oliver W. M. Rauhut	2011	Tendaguru Formation (Late Jurassic, Kimmeridgian)	Tanzania (Lindi)	Known from a few vertebrae somewhat similar to those of Acrocanthosaurus	
Viavenator	Leonardo S. Filippi; Ariel H. Méndez; Rubén D. Juárez Valieri; Alberto C. Garrido	2016	Bajo de la Carpa Formation (Late Cretaceous, Santonian)	Argentina (Neuquén)	May have relied on quick movements of its head and gaze stabilization when hunting	
Volgadraco	Alexander O. Averianov; M. S. Arkhangelsky; E. M. Pervushov	2008	Rybushka Formation (Late Cretaceous, Campanian)	Russia (Saratov Oblast)	Originally described as an azhdarchid but subsequent analyses found it to be pteranodontian	
Volgatitan	Alexander O. Averianov; Vladimir Efimov	2018	Unnamed Early Cretaceous Russian formation (Early Cretaceous, Hauterivian)	Russia (Ulyanovsk Oblast)	Closely related to South American titanosaurs	
Volgavis	Lev A. Nessov; Alexander A. Yarkov	1989	Unnamed Late Cretaceous Russian formation (Late Cretaceous, Maastrichtian)	Russia (Volgograd Oblast)	May be a Paleocene charadriiform	
Volkheimeria	José F. Bonaparte	1979	Cañadón Asfalto Formation (Early Jurassic, Toarcian)	Argentina (Chubut)	Coexisted with at least four other sauropods	
Vorona	Catherine A. Forster; Luis M. Chiappe; David W. Krause; Scott D. Sampson	1996	Maevarano Formation (Late Cretaceous, Maastrichtian)	Madagascar (Betsiboka)	The first pre-Holocene bird found on Madagascar	
Vouivria	Philip D. Mannion; Ronan Allain; Olivier Moine	2017	Calcaires de Clerval (Late Jurassic, Oxfordian)	France (Bourgogne-Franche-Comté)	The oldest known titanosauriform	
Vulcanodon	Michael A. Raath	1972	Forest Sandstone (Early Jurassic, Hettangian to Sinemurian)	Zimbabwe (Mashonaland West)	Theropod teeth were found associated with the holotype	
Wakinosaurus	Yoshihiko Okazaki	1992	Sengoku Formation (Early Cretaceous, Hauterivian to Barremian)	Japan (Fukuoka)	May be a close relative of Acrocanthosaurus	
Walgettosuchus	Friedrich von Huene	1932	Griman Creek Formation (Early Cretaceous to Late Cretaceous, Albian to Cenomanian)	Australia (New South Wales)	Has been considered synonymous with Rapator, but too little is known of both genera to be certain	
Wamweracaudia	Philip D. Mannion; Paul Upchurch; Daniela Schwarz; Oliver Wings	2019	Tendaguru Formation (Late Jurassic, Oxfordian to Tithonian)	Tanzania (Lindi)	Described as the first definitive mamenchisaurid known from outside Asia	
Wannanosaurus	Lianhai Hou	1977	Xiaoyan Formation (Late Cretaceous, Campanian to Maastrichtian)	China (Anhui)	Basal for a pachycephalosaur as indicated by its flat skull with large openings	
Weewarrasaurus	Phil R. Bell; Matthew C. Herne; Tom Brougham; Elizabeth T. Smith	2018	Griman Creek Formation (Early Cretaceous to Late Cretaceous, Albian to Cenomanian)	Australia (New South Wales)	Unusually, its fossils were preserved in opal	
Wellnhoferia	Andrzej Elżanowski	2001	Altmühltal Formation (Late Jurassic, Tithonian)	Germany (Bavaria)	May be another specimen of Archaeopteryx	
Wellnhopterus	Brian Andres; Wann Langston Jr.	2021	Javelina Formation (Late Cretaceous, Maastrichtian)	United States (Texas)	The holotype was originally named Javelinadactylus, but it was discarded	
Wendiceratops	David C. Evans; Michael J. Ryan	2015	Oldman Formation (Late Cretaceous, Campanian)	Canada (Alberta)	Had three pairs of enlarged, curved epiparietals at the very top of its frill	
Wenupteryx	Laura Codorniú; Zulma Gasparini	2012	Vaca Muerta (Late Jurassic, Tithonian)	Argentina (Neuquén)	Closely related to archaeopterodactyloids	
Wiehenvenator	Oliver W. M. Rauhut; Tom R. Hübner; Klaus-Peter Lanser	2016	Ornatenton Formation (Middle Jurassic, Callovian)	Germany (North Rhine-Westphalia)	Before its formal description, it had been nicknamed the "Monster of Minden"	
Wightia	David M. Martill: Mick Green; Roy E. Smith; Megan L. Jacobs; John Winch	2020	Wessex Formation (Early Cretaceous, Barremian)	England (Isle of Wight)	The oldest known tapejarid from outside China	
Willinakaqe	Rubén D. Juárez Valieri; José A. Haro; Lucas E. Fiorelli; Jorge O. Calvo	2010	Allen Formation (Late Cretaceous, Maastrichtian)	Argentina (Río Negro)	As originally described, it represented a chimera of two different taxa, one of which was later named Bonapartesaurus	
Wintonotitan	Scott A. Hocknull; Matt A. White; Travis R. Tischler; Alex G. Cook; Naomi D. Calleja; Trish Sloan; David A. Elliott	2009	Winton Formation (Late Cretaceous, Cenomanian to Turonian)	Australia (Queensland)	More gracile than other contemporary titanosaurs	
Wuerhosaurus	Zhiming Dong	1973	Ejinhoro Formation (Early Cretaceous, Barremian); Lianmuqin Formation (Early Cretaceous, Aptian to Albian)*; Luohandong Formation (Early Cretaceous, Aptian to Albian)	China (Inner Mongolia; Xinjiang*)	Preserved with low rectangular plates but these may be broken	
Wukongopterus	Xiaolin Wang; Alexander W. A. Kellner; Shunxing Jiang; Xi Meng	2009	Tiaojishan Formation (Late Jurassic, Oxfordian)	China (Liaoning)	Had both a long neck and a long tail	
Wulagasaurus	Pascal Godefroit; Shulin Hai; Tingxiang Yu; Pascaline Lauters	2008	Yuliangze Formation (Late Cretaceous, Maastrichtian)	China (Heilongjiang)	A rare hadrosaurid known from far less remains than the contemporary Amurosaurus	
Wulatelong	Xing Xu; Qingwei Tan; Shuo Wang; Corwin Sullivan; David W. E. Hone; Fenglu Han; Qingyu Ma; Lin Tan; Dong Xiao	2013	Bayan Mandahu Formation (Late Cretaceous, Campanian)	China (Inner Mongolia)	Known from a partial skeleton including some parts of the skull	
Wulong	Ashley W. Poust; Chuling Gao; David J. Varricchio; Jianlin Wu; Fengjiao Zhang	2020	Jiufotang Formation (Early Cretaceous, Aptian)	China (Liaoning)	Analysis of preserved melanosomes suggests it was mostly gray with iridescent wings	
Wyleyia	Colin J. O. Harrison; Cyril A. Walker	1973	Hastings Beds (Early Cretaceous, Valanginian)	England (West Sussex)	Formerly considered a non-avialan dinosaur	
Xenoceratops	Michael J. Ryan; David C. Evans; Kieran M. Shepherd	2012	Foremost Formation (Late Cretaceous, Campanian)	Canada (Alberta)	Possessed two long spikes at the top of its frill with smaller knobs at their bases	
Xenoposeidon	Michael P. Taylor; Darren Naish	2007	Hastings Beds (Early Cretaceous, Valanginian)	England (East Sussex)	Only known from a single, very unique vertebra	
Xenotarsosaurus	Rubén D. F. Martínez; Olga Giménez; Jorge Rodríguez; Graciela Bochatey	1986	Bajo Barreal Formation (Late Cretaceous, Cenomanian to Turonian)	Argentina (Chubut)	Its astragalus and calcaneum had an unusual shape	
Xericeps	David M. Martill; David M. Unwin; Nizar Ibrahim; Nicholas R. Longrich	2018	Kem Kem Group (Late Cretaceous, Cenomanian)	Morocco (Drâa-Tafilalet)	Had an unusual, forceps-like beak	
Xiangornis	Dongyu Hu; Xing Xu; Lianhai Hou; Corwin Sullivan	2012	Jiufotang Formation (Early Cretaceous, Aptian)	China (Liaoning)	The hand of this genus was similar to that of ornithuromorphs, likely through convergent evolution	
Xianshanosaurus	Junchang Lü; Li Xu; Xiaojun Jiang; Songhai Jia; Ming Li; Chongxi Yuan; Xingliao Zhang; Qiang Ji	2009	Haoling Formation (Early Cretaceous, Aptian to Albian)	China (Henan)	May have been closely related to Daxiatitan	
Xiaosaurus	Zhiming Dong; Zilu Tang	1983	Xiashaximiao Formation (Middle Jurassic to Late Jurassic, Bathonian to Oxfordian)	China (Sichuan)	An ornithischian of uncertain affinities	
Xiaotingia	Xing Xu; Hailu You; Kai Du; Fenglu Han	2011	Tiaojishan Formation (Late Jurassic, Oxfordian)	China (Liaoning)	Well-preserved but inconsistent in phylogenetic placement	
Xinghaiornis	Xuri Wang; Luis M. Chiappe; Fangfang Teng; Qiang Ji	2013	Yixian Formation (Early Cretaceous, Barremian)	China (Liaoning)	May have been specialized for probing in mud	
Xingtianosaurus	Rui Qiu; Xiaolin Wang; Qiang Wang; Ning Li; Jialiang Zhang; Yiyun Ma	2019	Yixian Formation (Early Cretaceous, Barremian)	China (Liaoning)	Retained the large third finger that was lost in other caudipterids	
Xingxiulong	Yaming Wang; Hailu You; Tao Wang	2017	Lufeng Formation (Early Jurassic, Hettangian to Sinemurian)	China (Yunnan)	Two species are known, with the X. yueorum being considerably larger than the type species X. chengi	
Xinjiangovenator	Oliver W. M. Rauhut; Xing Xu	2005	Lianmuqin Formation (Early Cretaceous, Aptian to Albian)	China (Xinjiang)	Remains originally identified as Phaedrolosaurus	
Xinjiangtitan	Wenhao Wu; Changfu Zhou; Oliver Wings; Toru Sekiya; Zhiming Dong	2013	Qiketai Formation (Middle Jurassic, Callovian)	China (Xinjiang)	Had an extremely long neck	
Xiongguanlong	Daqing Li; Mark A. Norell; Keqin Gao; Nathan D. Smith; Peter J. Makovicky	2010	Xiagou Formation (Early Cretaceous, Aptian)	China (Gansu)	More robust than other early tyrannosauroids, possibly to support its elongated skull	
Xixianykus	Xing Xu; Deyou Wang; Corwin Sullivan; David W. E. Hone; Fenglu Han; Ronghao Yan; Fuming Du	2010	Majiacun Formation (Late Cretaceous, Coniacian to Santonian)	China (Henan)	One of the smallest known non-avian dinosaurs	
Xixiasaurus	Junchang Lü; Li Xu; Yongqing Liu; Xingliao Zhang; Songhai Jia; Qiang Ji	2010	Majiacun Formation (Late Cretaceous, Coniacian to Santonian)	China (Henan)	Distinguished from other troodontids by its possession of exactly twenty-two teeth in each maxilla	
Xixiposaurus	Toru Sekiya	2010	Lufeng Formation (Early Jurassic, Hettangian to Sinemurian)	China (Yunnan)	A poorly known potential massospondylid	
Xiyunykus	Xing Xu; Jonah N. Choiniere; Qingwei Tan; Roger B.J. Benson; James M. Clark; Corwin Sullivan; Qi Zhao; Fenglu Han; Qingyu Ma; Yiming He; Shuo Wang; Hai Xing; Lin Tan	2018	Tugulu Group (Early Cretaceous, Aptian to Albian)	China (Xinjiang)	Had an unspecialized hand morphology for an alvarezsaur, having three fingers of roughly equal length and construction	
Xuanhanosaurus	Zhiming Dong	1984	Xiashaximiao Formation (Middle Jurassic to Late Jurassic, Bathonian to Oxfordian)	China (Sichuan)	Originally mistakenly believed to have been capable of quadrupedal locomotion	
Xuanhuaceratops	Xijin Zhao; Zhengwu Cheng; Xing Xu; Peter J. Makovicky	2006	Houcheng Formation (Middle Jurassic, Callovian)	China (Hebei)	Possessed a large premaxillary tooth right behind its beak	
Xunmenglong	Lida Xing; Tetsuto Miyashita; Donghao Wang; Kecheng Niu; Philip J. Currie	2020	Huajiying Formation (Early Cretaceous, Hauterivian)	China (Hebei)	The holotype was originally presented as part of a chimera involving three different animals	
Xuwulong	Hailu You; Daqing Li; Weichang Liu	2011	Xiagou Formation (Early Cretaceous, Aptian)	China (Gansu)	The tip of its dentary was V-shaped when viewed from the side	
Yamaceratops	Peter J. Makovicky; Mark A. Norell	2006	Javkhlant Formation (Late Cretaceous, Santonian to Campanian)	Mongolia (Dornogovi)	Possessed a short, stubby frill	
Yamanasaurus	Sebastián Apesteguía; John E. Soto Luzuriaga; Pablo A. Gallina; José T. Granda; Galo A. Guamán Jaramillo	2020	Río Playas Formation (Late Cretaceous, Campanian to Maastrichtian)	Ecuador (Loja)	The northernmost South American saltasaurine known to date	
Yamatosaurus	Yoshitsugu Kobayashi; Ryuji Takasaki; Katsuhiro Kubota; Anthony R. Fiorillo	2021	Kita-Ama Formation (Late Cretaceous, Maastrichtian)	Japan (Hyōgo)	Basal yet survived late enough to be contemporaneous with more advanced hadrosaurids	
Yanbeilong	Lei Jia; Ning Li; Liyang Dong; Jianru Shi; Zhishuai Kang; Suozhu Wang; Shichao Xu; Hailu You	2025	Zuoyun Formation (Early Cretaceous, Albian)	China (Shanxi)	One of the youngest known stegosaurs	
Yandangornis	Zhengquan Cai; Lijun Zhao	1999	Tangshang Formation (Late Cretaceous, Turonian to Campanian)	China (Zhejiang)	Has been considered a non-avialan theropod	
Yandusaurus	Xinlu He	1979	Xiashaximiao Formation (Middle Jurassic to Late Jurassic, Bathonian to Oxfordian)	China (Sichuan)	Some fossils were destroyed by a composter before they could be studied	
Yangavis	Min Wang; Zhonghe Zhou	2019	Yixian Formation (Early Cretaceous, Barremian)	China (Liaoning)	Had an enlarged second hand claw unlike other confuciusornithiforms, the function of which is unknown	
Yangchuanosaurus	Zhiming Dong; Yihong Zhang; Xuanmin Li; Shiwu Zhou	1978	Shangshaximiao Formation (Late Jurassic, Oxfordian to Tithonian)	China (Sichuan)	The largest theropod known from the Shaximiao Formation	
Yanornis	Zhonghe Zhou; Fucheng Zhang	2001	Jiufotang Formation (Early Cretaceous, Aptian)*; Yixian Formation (Early Cretaceous, Barremian)	China (Liaoning)	One specimen of Y. martini was combined with one of a Microraptor to create a fossil chimera	
Yarasuchus	Kasturi Sen	2005	Yerrapalli Formation (Middle Triassic, Anisian)	India (Telangana)	Like other aphanosaurs, it was originally mistaken to be another type of archosaur	
Yatenavis	Gerardo Álvarez Herrera: Federico L. Agnolín; Sebastián Rozadilla; Gastón E. Lo Coco; Makoto Manabe; Takanobu Tsuihiji; Fernando E. Novas	2023	Chorrillo Formation (Late Cretaceous, Maastrichtian)	Argentina (Santa Cruz)	The southernmost known enantiornithean and one of the youngest members of the group	
Yaverlandia	Peter M. Galton	1971	Wessex Formation (Early Cretaceous, Barremian)	England (Isle of Wight)	Originally misidentified as a pachycephalosaur because of its thick skull roof	
Yehuecauhceratops	Héctor E. Rivera-Sylva; Eberhard Frey; Wolfgang Stinnesbeck; José Rubén Guzmán-Gutiérrez; Arturo H. González-González	2017	Aguja Formation (Late Cretaceous, Campanian)	Mexico (Coahuila)	One of the smallest known ceratopsids	
Yelaphomte	Ricardo N. Martínez; Brian Andres; Cecilia Apaldetti; Ignacio A. Cerda	2022	Quebrada del Barro Formation (Late Triassic, Norian)	Argentina (San Juan)	Found in terrestrial deposits, suggesting that their absence from northern deposits is an artifact of sampling bias	
Yi	Xing Xu; Xiaoting Zheng; Corwin Sullivan; Xiaoli Wang; Lida Xing; Yan Wang; Xiaomei Zhang; Jingmai K. O'Connor; Fucheng Zhang; Yanhong Pan	2015	Tiaojishan Formation (Late Jurassic, Oxfordian)	China (Hebei)	Possessed a "styliform element" jutting out from its wrist that supported a bat-like membranous wing	
Yimenosaurus	Ziqi Bai; Jie Yang; Guohui Wang	1990	Fengjiahe Formation (Early Jurassic, Pliensbachian)	China (Yunnan)	Much of its skeleton is known, including the entirety of the skull	
Yingshanosaurus	Songlin Zhu	1994	Shangshaximiao Formation (Late Jurassic, Oxfordian to Tithonian)	China (Sichuan)	Possessed greatly enlarged shoulder spines	
Yinlong	Xing Xu; Catherine A. Forster; James M. Clark; Jinyou Mo	2006	Shishugou Formation (Middle Jurassic to Late Jurassic, Callovian to Oxfordian)	China (Xinjiang)	Its skull displays features of ceratopsians, pachycephalosaurs, and heterodontosaurids	
Yixianopterus	Junchang Lü; Shu-An Ji; Chongxi Yuan; Chunling Gao; Yuewu Sun; Qiang Ji	2006	Yixian Formation (Early Cretaceous, Barremian)	China (Liaoning)	Most of the skull was fabricated before acquisition	
Yixianornis	Zhonghe Zhou; Fucheng Zhang	2001	Jiufotang Formation (Early Cretaceous, Aptian)	China (Liaoning)	Had a retrical bulb that allowed the tail fan to be folded when not in flight	
Yixianosaurus	Xing Xu; Xiaolin Wang	2003	Yixian Formation (Early Cretaceous, Barremian)	China (Liaoning)	Had extremely elongated manual elements	
Yizhousaurus	Qiannan Zhang; Hailu You; Tao Wang; Sankar Chatterjee	2018	Lufeng Formation (Early Jurassic, Sinemurian)	China (Yunnan)	Its skull was very similar to those of sauropods despite being more primitive	
Yongjinglong	Liguo Li; Daqing Li; Hailu You; Peter Dodson	2014	Hekou Group (Early Cretaceous, Valanginian to Albian)	China (Gansu)	Possessed an extremely long, broad scapula	
Ypupiara	Arthur S. Brum; Rodrigo V. Pêgas; Kamila L. N. Bandeira; Lucy G. de Souza; Diogenes A. Campos; Alexander W. A. Kellner	2021	Serra da Galga Formation (Late Cretaceous, Maastrichtian)	Brazil (Minas Gerais)	May have been a piscivore due to the shape of its teeth	
Yuanchuavis	Min Wang: Jingmai K. O'Connor; Tao Zhao; Yanhong Pan; Xiaoting Zheng; Xiaoli Wang; Zhonghe Zhou	2021	Jiufotang Formation (Early Cretaceous, Aptian)	China (Liaoning)	Possesses an elaborate "pintail" tail fan longer than its body, which may have had a display function	
Yuanjiawaornis	Dongyu Hu; Ying Liu; Jinhua Li; Xing Xu; Lianhai Hou	2015	Jiufotang Formation (Early Cretaceous, Aptian)	China (Liaoning)	One of the largest enantiornitheans known from decent remains	
Yuanmousaurus	Junchang Lü; Shaoxue Li; Qiang Ji; Guofu Wang; Jiahua Zhang; Zhiming Dong	2006	Zhanghe Formation (Middle Jurassic, Aalenian to Callovian)	China (Yunnan)	Shares features of its vertebrae with Patagosaurus	
Yuanyanglong	Mingze Hao; Zhiyu Li; Zhili Wang; Shuqiong Wang; Feimin Ma; Qinggele; James Logan King; Rui Pei; Qi Zhao; Xing Xu	2025	Miaogou Formation (Early Cretaceous, Aptian to Albian)	China (Inner Mongolia)	The only Early Cretaceous oviraptorosaur known from the Gobi Desert	
Yueosaurus	Wenjie Zheng; Xingsheng Jin; Masateru Shibata; Yoichi Azuma; Fangming Yu	2012	Liangtoutang Formation (Early Cretaceous to Late Cretaceous, Albian to Cenomanian)	China (Zhejiang)	Probably closely related to Jeholosaurus	
Yulong	Junchang Lü; Philip J. Currie; Li Xu; Xingliao Zhang; Hanyong Pu; Songhai Jia	2013	Qiupa Formation (Late Cretaceous, Maastrichtian)	China (Henan)	Known from multiple specimens, most of which are juveniles	
Yumenornis	Yaming Wang; Jingmai K. O'Connor; Daqing Li; Hailu You	2013	Xiagou Formation (Early Cretaceous, Aptian)	China (Gansu)	Known from only an isolated wing	
Yunganglong	Runfu Wang; Hailu You; Shichao Xu; Suozhu Wang; Jian Yi; Lijuan Xie; Lei Jia; Yaxian Li	2013	Zhumapu Formation (Late Cretaceous, Cenomanian	China (Shanxi)	Discovered close to a World Heritage Site	
Yungavolucris	Luis M. Chiappe	1993	Lecho Formation (Late Cretaceous, Maastrichtian)	Argentina (Salta)	Had a large and unusually wide tarsometatarsus	
Yunmenglong	Junchang Lü; Li Xu; Hanyong Pu; Xingliao Zhang; Yiyang Zhang; Songhai Jia; Huali Chang; Jiming Zhang; Xuefang Wei	2013	Haoling Formation (Early Cretaceous, Aptian to Albian)	China (Henan)	May have been exceptionally large	
Yunnanosaurus	Zhongjian Yang	1942	Fengjiahe Formation (Early Jurassic, Pliensbachian); Lufeng Formation (Early Jurassic, Hettangian to Sinemurian)*	China (Yunnan)	Its teeth were self-sharpening similar to those of sauropods, likely through convergent evolution	
Yunyangosaurus	Hui Dai; Roger B.J. Benson; Xufeng Hu; Qingyu Ma; Chao Tan; Ning Li; Ming Xiao; Haiqian Hu; Yuxuan Zhou; Zhaoying Wei; Feng Zhang; Shan Jiang; Deliang Li; Guangzhao Peng; Yilun Yu; Xing Xu	2020	Xintiangou Formation (Early Jurassic to Middle Jurassic, Toarcian to Aalenian)	China (Chongqing)	Potentially an early megalosauroid	
Yuornis	Li Xu; Eric Buffetaut; Jingmai K. O'Connor; Xingliao Zhang; Songhai Jia; Jiming Zhang; Huali Chang; Haiyan Tong	2021	Qiupa Formation (Late Cretaceous, Maastrichtian)	China (Henan)	A large, toothless enantiornithean	
Yurgovuchia	Phil Senter; James I. Kirkland; Donald D. DeBlieux; Scott Madsen; Natalie Toth	2012	Cedar Mountain Formation (Early Cretaceous, Berriasian to Valanginian)	United States (Utah)	May have had a flexible tail due to the structure of its caudal vertebrae	
Yutyrannus	Xing Xu; Kebai Wang; Ke Zhang; Qingyu Ma; Lida Xing; Corwin Sullivan; Dongyu Hu; Shuqing Cheng; Shuo Wang	2012	Yixian Formation (Early Cretaceous, Barremian)	China (Liaoning)	The largest known dinosaur to preserve direct evidence of feathers	
Yuxisaurus	Xi Yao; Paul M. Barrett; Lei Yang; Xing Xu; Shundong Bi	2022	Fengjiahe Formation (Early Jurassic, Pliensbachian)	China (Yunnan)	Had more than one hundred osteoderms	
Yuzhoulong	Hui Dai; Chao Tan; Can Xiong; Qingyu Ma; Ning Li; Haidong Yu; Zhaoying Wei; Ping Wang; Jian Yi; Guangbiao Wei; Hailu You; Xinxin Ren	2022	Xiashaximiao Formation (Middle Jurassic to Late Jurassic, Bathonian to Oxfordian)	China (Chongqing)	One of the oldest known macronarians	
Zalmoxes	David B. Weishampel; Coralia-Maria Jianu; Zoltán Csiki-Sava; David B. Norman	2003	Densuș-Ciula Formation (Late Cretaceous, Maastrichtian); Sânpetru Formation (Late Cretaceous, Maastrichtian)*; Sebeș Formation (Late Cretaceous, Maastrichtian)	Romania (Alba; Hunedoara)*	Two species of contrasting sizes have been named	
Zanabazar	Mark A. Norell; Peter J. Makovicky; Gabe S. Bever; Amy M. Balanoff; James M. Clark; Rinchen Barsbold; Timothy B. Rowe	2009	Nemegt Formation (Late Cretaceous, Maastrichtian)	Mongolia (Ömnögovi)	Originally named as a species of Saurornithoides	
Zapalasaurus	Leonardo Salgado; Ismar S. Carvalho; Alberto C. Garrido	2006	La Amarga Formation (Early Cretaceous, Barremian to Aptian)	Argentina (Neuquén)	Known from an incomplete skeleton, including several caudal vertebrae	
Zapsalis	Edward D. Cope	1876	Judith River Formation (Late Cretaceous, Campanian)	United States (Montana)	Some teeth referred to this genus actually belong to Saurornitholestes	
Zaraapelta	Victoria M. Arbour; Philip J. Currie; Demchig Badamgarav	2014	Baruungoyot Formation (Late Cretaceous, Maastrichtian)	Mongolia (Ömnögovi)	Had an intricate pattern of osteoderms on its skull	
Zby	Octávio Mateus; Philip D. Mannion; Paul Upchurch	2014	Lourinhã Formation (Late Jurassic, Kimmeridgian)	Portugal (Lisbon)	Originally believed to be a specimen of Turiasaurus	
Zephyrosaurus	Hans-Dieter Sues	1980	Cloverly Formation (Early Cretaceous, Albian)	United States (Montana)	Currently only known from fragmentary remains but several undescribed specimens exist	
Zhanghenglong	Hai Xing; Deyou Wang; Fenglu Han; Corwin Sullivan; Qingyu Ma; Yiming He; David W. E. Hone; Ronghao Yan; Fuming Du; Xing Xu	2014	Majiacun Formation (Late Cretaceous, Coniacian to Santonian)	China (Henan)	Reconstructed by its describers with a straight, rectangular back, although no complete neural spines are known	
Zhejiangopterus	Zhengquan Cai; Feng Wei	1994	Tangshang Formation (Late Cretaceous, Turonian to Campanian)	China (Zhejiang)	One of the most completely known azhdarchids	
Zhejiangosaurus	Junchang Lü; Xingsheng Jin; Yiming Sheng; Yihong Li; Guoping Wang; Yoichi Azuma	2007	Chaochuan Formation (Early Cretaceous to Late Cretaceous, Albian to Cenomanian)	China (Zhejiang)	Has no diagnostic features	
Zhenyuanlong	Junchang Lü; Stephen L. Brusatte	2015	Yixian Formation (Early Cretaceous, Barremian)	China (Liaoning)	Possessed large wings with long feathers, but was most likely flightless	
Zhenyuanopterus	Junchang Lü	2010	Yixian Formation (Early Cretaceous, Barremian)	China (Liaoning)	May have fed similar to Platanista dolphins, which have similar dentition	
Zhongjianornis	Zhonghe Zhou; Fucheng Zhang; Zhiheng Li	2010	Jiufotang Formation (Early Cretaceous, Aptian)	China (Liaoning)	Possibly one of the most primitive toothless birds	
Zhongjianosaurus	Xing Xu; Zichuan Qin	2017	Yixian Formation (Early Cretaceous, Barremian)	China (Liaoning)	Distinguishable by its characteristically elongated legs	
Zhongornis	Chunling Gao; Luis M. Chiappe; Qinjing Meng; Jingmai K. O'Connor; Xuri Wang; Xiaodong Cheng; Jinyuan Liu	2008	Yixian Formation (Early Cretaceous, Barremian)	China (Liaoning)	Usually thought to be a basal avialan but one hypothesis is that it is a non-avian scansoriopterygid	
Zhongyuansaurus	Li Xu; Junchang Lü; Xingliao Zhang; Songhai Jia; Weiyong Hu; Jiming Zhang; Yanhua Wu; Qiang Ji	2007	Haoling Formation (Early Cretaceous, Aptian to Albian)	China (Henan)	Potentially a synonym of Gobisaurus, although the describers of the second species, Z. junchangi, noted various features that could distinguish it from the former taxon	
Zhouornis	Zihui Zhang; Luis M. Chiappe; Gang Han; Anusuya Chinsamy	2013	Jiufotang Formation (Early Cretaceous, Aptian)	China (Liaoning)	A large bohaiornithid with a well-preserved braincase	
Zhuchengceratops	Xing Xu; Kebai Wang; Xijin Zhao; Corwin Sullivan; Shuqing Chen	2010	Wangshi Group (Late Cretaceous, Campanian)	China (Shandong)	Had a particularly deep mandible	
Zhuchengtitan	Jinyou Mo; Kebai Wang; Shuqing Chen; Peiye Wang; Xing Xu	2017	Wangshi Group (Late Cretaceous, Campanian)	China (Shandong)	The proportions of its humerus suggest a close relationship with Opisthocoelicaudia	
Zhuchengtyrannus	David W. E. Hone; Kebai Wang; Corwin Sullivan; Xijin Zhao; Shuqing Chen; Dunjin Li; Shu-An Ji; Qiang Ji; Xing Xu	2011	Wangshi Group (Late Cretaceous, Campanian)	China (Shandong)	Closely related to Tarbosaurus and Tyrannosaurus	
Zhyraornis	Lev A. Nessov	1984	Bissekty Formation (Late Cretaceous, Turonian)	Uzbekistan (Navoiy)	Two species are known, both from isolated synsacra	
Ziapelta	Victoria M. Arbour; Michael E. Burns; Robert M. Sullivan; Spencer G. Lucas; Amanda K. Cantrell; Joshua Fry; Thomas L. Suazo	2014	Kirtland Formation (Late Cretaceous, Campanian)	United States (New Mexico)	Many specimens are known, most from the front part of the animal	
Zigongosaurus	Lianhai Hou; Shiwu Zhou; Xijin Zhao	1976	Shangshaximiao Formation (Late Jurassic, Oxfordian to Tithonian)	China (Sichuan)	May be a species of Mamenchisaurus	
Zizhongosaurus	Zhiming Dong; Shiwu Zhou; Yihong Zhang	1983	Ziliujing Formation (Early Jurassic, Sinemurian to Toarcian)	China (Sichuan)	Poorly known but was most likely basal for a sauropod	
Zuniceratops	Douglas G. Wolfe; James I. Kirkland	1998	Moreno Hill Formation (Late Cretaceous, Turonian to Coniacian)	United States (New Mexico)	Carried a pair of brow horns despite not being a member of the Ceratopsidae	
Zuolong	Jonah N. Choiniere; James M. Clark; Catherine A. Forster; Xing Xu	2010	Shishugou Formation (Middle Jurassic to Late Jurassic, Callovian to Oxfordian)	China (Xinjiang)	Known from both cranial and postcranial remains	
Zuoyunlong	Runfu Wang; Hailu You; Suozhu Wang; Shichao Xu; Jian Yi; Lijuan Xie; Lei Jia; Hai Xing	2017	Zhumapu Formation (Late Cretaceous, Cenomanian	China (Shanxi)	May have been close to the separation between North American and Asian hadrosauroids	
Zupaysaurus	Andrea B. Arcucci; Rodolfo A. Coria	2003	Los Colorados Formation (Late Triassic, Norian)	Argentina (La Rioja)	Although commonly depicted with head crests, they may in fact be misplaced lacrimal bones	
Zuul	Victoria M. Arbour; David C. Evans	2017	Judith River Formation (Late Cretaceous, Campanian)	United States (Montana)	Preserves several osteoderms, keratin, and skin remains	

== See also ==
- List of Mesozoic bird-line archosaur genera (A–B)
- List of Mesozoic bird-line archosaur genera (C–F)
- List of Mesozoic bird-line archosaur genera (G–K)
- List of Mesozoic bird-line archosaur genera (L–O)
- List of Mesozoic bird-line archosaur genera (P–S)
