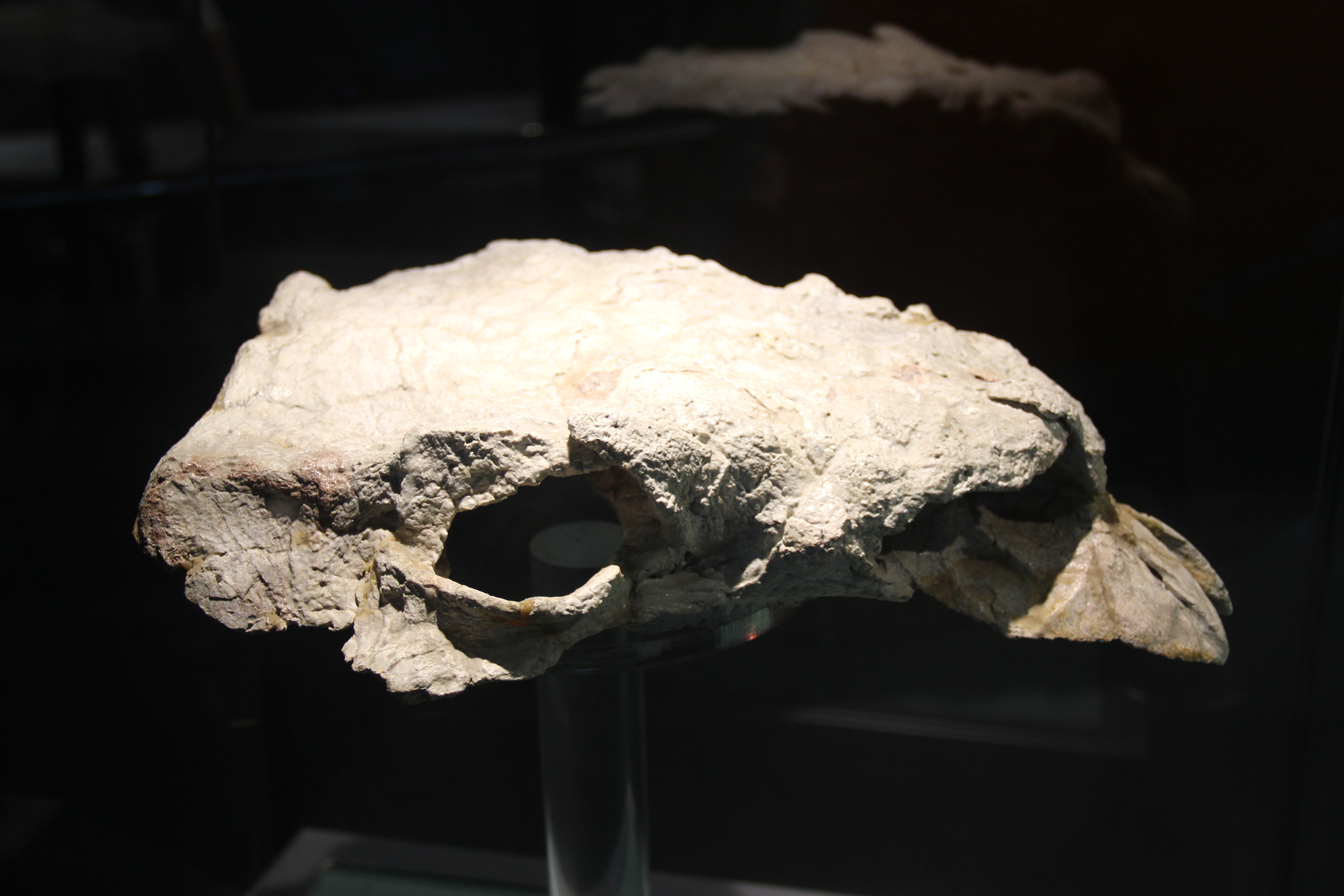
- Holotype skull of Z. luoyangensis

Scientific classification
- Kingdom: Animalia
- Phylum: Chordata
- Class: Reptilia
- Clade: Dinosauria
- Clade: †Ornithischia
- Clade: †Thyreophora
- Clade: †Ankylosauria
- Clade: †Euankylosauria
- Family: †Ankylosauridae
- Genus: †Zhongyuansaurus; Xu et al., 2007

Type species
- †Zhongyuansaurus luoyangensis Xu et al., 2007

Other species
- †Zhongyuansaurus junchangi Zhang et al., 2025

= Zhongyuansaurus =

Zhongyuansaurus Temporal range: Early Cretaceous, ?Albian

Extinct genus of ankylosaurid dinosaurs

Zhongyuansaurus (meaning "Zhongyuan lizard") is an extinct genus of ankylosaurid dinosaurs known from the Early Cretaceous Haoling Formation of what is now Henan Province, China. The genus contains two species, Z. luoyangensis, named in 2007, and Z. junchangi, named in 2025, both known from a single partial skeleton. Zhongyuansaurus is similar to Gobisaurus, prompting some researchers to regard the genera as synonymous.

== Discovery and naming ==
The Zhongyuansaurus type species, Z. luoyangensis, was named and described in 2007 by Xu and colleagues. The holotype specimen, HGM 41HIII-0002, consists of a nearly complete skull, fragments of the lower jaw, a cervical neural spine, dorsal vertebrae, caudal vertebrae, posterior caudal vertebral centra, fused distal caudal vertebrae, ribs, a humerus, both ischia, a pubis, and osteoderms. The specimen was collected from the Haoling Formation in Henan Province of Ruyang County, China. The specimen is accessioned at the Henan Province Geological Museum in China.

The generic name, Zhongyuansaurus, is derived from "Zhongyuan", after the area south of Yellow River area, and the Greek word sauros, meaning "lizard". The specific name, luoyangensis, refers to the Luoyang area where the holotype was found.

In a 2015 publication, Victoria Arbour and Phillip J. Currie determined that Zhongyuansaurus may be a junior synonym of Gobisaurus domoculus, as they recognized all the diagnosable characteristics of Gobisaurus in the Zhongyuansaurus holotype, except where these could not be assessed due to damage.

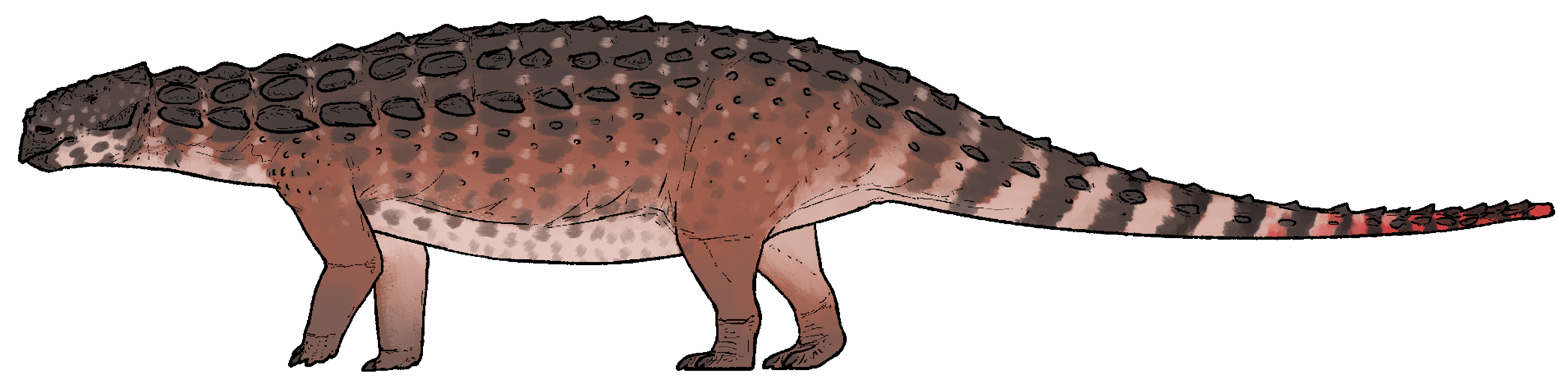
Life reconstruction of Z. junchangi

In 2025, Zhang et al. described Zhongyuansaurus junchangi as a new species in the genus based on the holotype, 41HIII0708, which comprises a right mandible, 14 free caudal vertebrae and seven fused caudal vertebrae forming the club 'handle', ten haemal arches, four ribs, the left humerus, one metatarsal, and 41 osteoderms. The specific name, junchangi, honors Chinese paleontologist Lü Junchang and his work in Henan. They noted several characteristics that could be used to distinguish Zhongyuansaurus from other Asian ankylosaurids, including Gobisaurus and Shamosaurus (an ankylosaurid similar to Gobisaurus). The specimen was found in the same rock layers as Z. luoyangensis.

== Description ==
Zhongyuansaurus, like other ankylosaurids, had numerous osteoderms embedded in the skin. In their 2007 description, Xu et al. recognised eight different sets of osteoderms pertaining to the holotype specimen. These osteoderms include a large, thin irregular quadrangle osteoderms that may have been located on the front portion of the back, large, thick, irregular quadrangle osteoderms that had a flat surface, and front edges that extend considerably downwards, circular osteoderms that have an off centred keel on the outer surface, asymmetrical circular osteoderms that have a well developed keel on the outer surface, small circular osteoderms that have irregular grooves and no ridges on the outer surface, hollow cone osteoderms that have an irregular grooved sculpture on the outer surface, kidney shaped osteoderms that have the sides folded upwards and one edge being thicker than the other, and ridge shaped osteoderms that have an irregular grooved sculpture on the outer surface.

An arrow-shaped bone with a pointed end was found near the region of the nasal. Xu et al. (2007) interpreted it as a nasal horn homologous to other osteoderms that would have protruded from the nasal bone on an angle without being fused to the bone, a feature not seen in any ankylosaur. The authors suggested that the nasal horn may have been used for intraspecific and interspecific combat.

The tail club of Zhongyuansaurus only preserves the "handle" and no "knob" osteoderms. The holotype preserves the terminal caudal vertebrae, so the absence of the “knob” osteoderms is not because the distal end of the tail is missing. Although the holotype specimen represents an immature individual based on cranial sutures, ontogeny does not seem to be an explanation for the absence of the knob osteoderms. In 2015, Arbour & Currie proposed alternate explanations for the lack of knob osteoderms; if they may were present in life, they were likely small and not firmly articulated to the handle, thus becoming disarticulated after death. However, they also noted that isolated tail club knobs from ankylosaurines often preserve some fragments of the distal caudal vertebrae or ossified tendons associated with the knob osteoderms. Since the distalmost caudal vertebrae are all preserved, this may indicate the lack of knob osteoderms altogether.

== Classification ==
Xu et al., 2007 originally considered Zhongyuansaurus to be a nodosaurid ankylosaur based on the skull proportions and the absence of a tail club. However, longer-than-wide skulls are a pleiomorphic trait of Ankylosauria and not a derived condition of nodosaurids. Carpenter et al., 2008 re-evaluated Zhongyuansaurus to the clade Shamosaurinae based on similarities with Shamosaurus. Thompson et al. (2012) recovered Zhongyuansaurus as a basal ankylosaurine and Arbour & Currie (2015) later concluded that Zhongyuansaurus was a probable junior synonym of Gobisaurus.

A phylogenetic analysis conducted by Thompson et al. (2012) is reproduced below.

- Ankylosauria
  - Nodosauridae
  - Ankylosauridae
    - Minmi paravertebra
    - - Liaoningosaurus paradoxus
      - - Cedarpelta bilbeyhallorum
        - - Gobisaurus domoculus
          - - Shamosaurus scutatus
            - Ankylosaurinae
              - Zhongyuansaurus luoyangensis
              - Tsagantegia longicranialis
              - - - Shanxia tianzhensis
                  - "Crichtonsaurus" benxiensis
                  - - - Ankylosaurus magniventris
                      - Euoplocephalus tutus
                    - - - Minotaurasaurus ramachandrani
                        - Pinacosaurus grangeri
                      - - - Tianzhenosaurus youngi
                          - Tarchia gigantea
                          - Talarurus plicatospineus
                          - Saichania chulsanensis
                          - Nodocephalosaurus kirtlandensis

== Paleoenvironment ==
Zhongyuansaurus was recovered from the Haoling Formation, which possibly dates to the Aptian and Albian stages of the Early Cretaceous. Zhongyuansaurus would have shared its habitat with the oviraptorid Luoyanggia, the sauropods Xianshanosaurus, Yunmenglong, Ruyangosaurus and Huanghetitan, an indeterminate ornithomimid, an indeterminate iguanodontian, and an indeterminate carcharodontosaurian.

== See also ==
- Timeline of ankylosaur research
