= Luoyanggia =

Luoyanggia Temporal range: Early Cretaceous, Aptian–Albian

Scientific classification
- Kingdom: Animalia
- Phylum: Chordata
- Class: Reptilia
- Clade: Dinosauria
- Clade: Saurischia
- Clade: Theropoda
- Family: †Oviraptoridae
- Genus: †Luoyanggia; Lü et al., 2009
- Species: †L. liudianensis

Binomial name
- †Luoyanggia liudianensis Lü et al., 2009

Extinct genus of dinosaurs

Luoyanggia (meaning "from Luoyang") is a genus of oviraptorid dinosaur known from the Early Cretaceous Haoling Formation of the Ruyang Basin in Henan Province, central China. The type species is L. liudianensis. Holtz estimated it at 1.5 meters (4.9 ft) and around 2.27–9.1 kilograms (5.0–20.1 lb). Molina-Pérez and Larramendi gave a similar size of 1.2 meters (3.9 ft) and 8.5 kilograms (19 lb).

== Paleobiology ==
Non-avian dinosaurs that co-existed with Luoyanggia included Ruyangosaurus, Zhongyuansaurus, Yunmenglong, Xianshanosaurus, and "Huanghetitan" ruyangensis. The type horizon of Luoyanggia was initially thought to date Cenomanian stage of the late Cretaceous period, but extensive fieldwork in the Ruyang Basin and invertebrate and microfossil assemblages indicate an Aptian-Albian age for the Haoling Formation.

== See also ==
- Timeline of oviraptorosaur research
