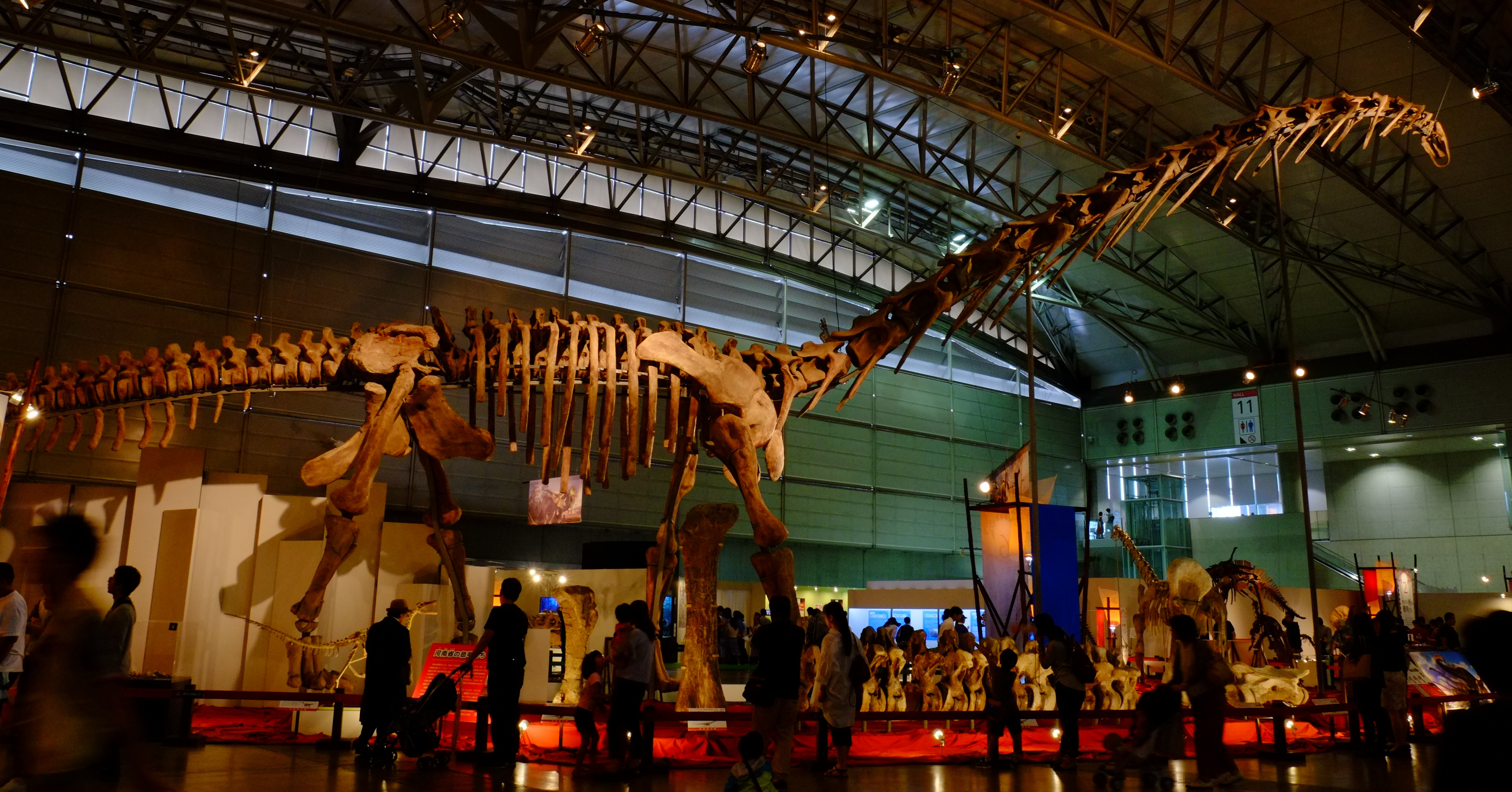
- Skeleton

Scientific classification
- Kingdom: Animalia
- Phylum: Chordata
- Class: Reptilia
- Clade: Dinosauria
- Clade: Saurischia
- Clade: †Sauropodomorpha
- Clade: †Sauropoda
- Clade: †Macronaria
- Clade: †Titanosauria
- Genus: †Ruyangosaurus; Lü et al., 2009

Type species
- †Ruyangosaurus giganteus Lü et al., 2009

= Ruyangosaurus =

Ruyangosaurus Temporal range: Early Cretaceous, Aptian–Albian

Extinct genus of dinosaurs

Ruyangosaurus (Ruyang County lizard) is a genus of titanosauriform sauropod dinosaur recovered from the Early Cretaceous Haoling Formation of China. The type species is R. giganteus, described in 2009 by Lü Junchang et al.

== Description ==
Along with Huanghetitan and Daxiatitan, Ruyangosaurus is among the largest dinosaurs discovered in Cretaceous Asia. In 2016 Gregory S. Paul gave a length of 30 meters (98 ft) and a weight of 50+ tonnes (55 short tons) - making it a 'mega-sauropod'.

According to another estimate, Ruyangosaurus was probably about 35 meters (115 ft) long, as evidenced by its 207 cm long femur and 127 cm long right tibia. In 2020 Molina-Perez and Larramendi gave a lower estimation of 24.8 meters (81.4 ft) and 34 tonnes (37.5 short tons).

Size comparison

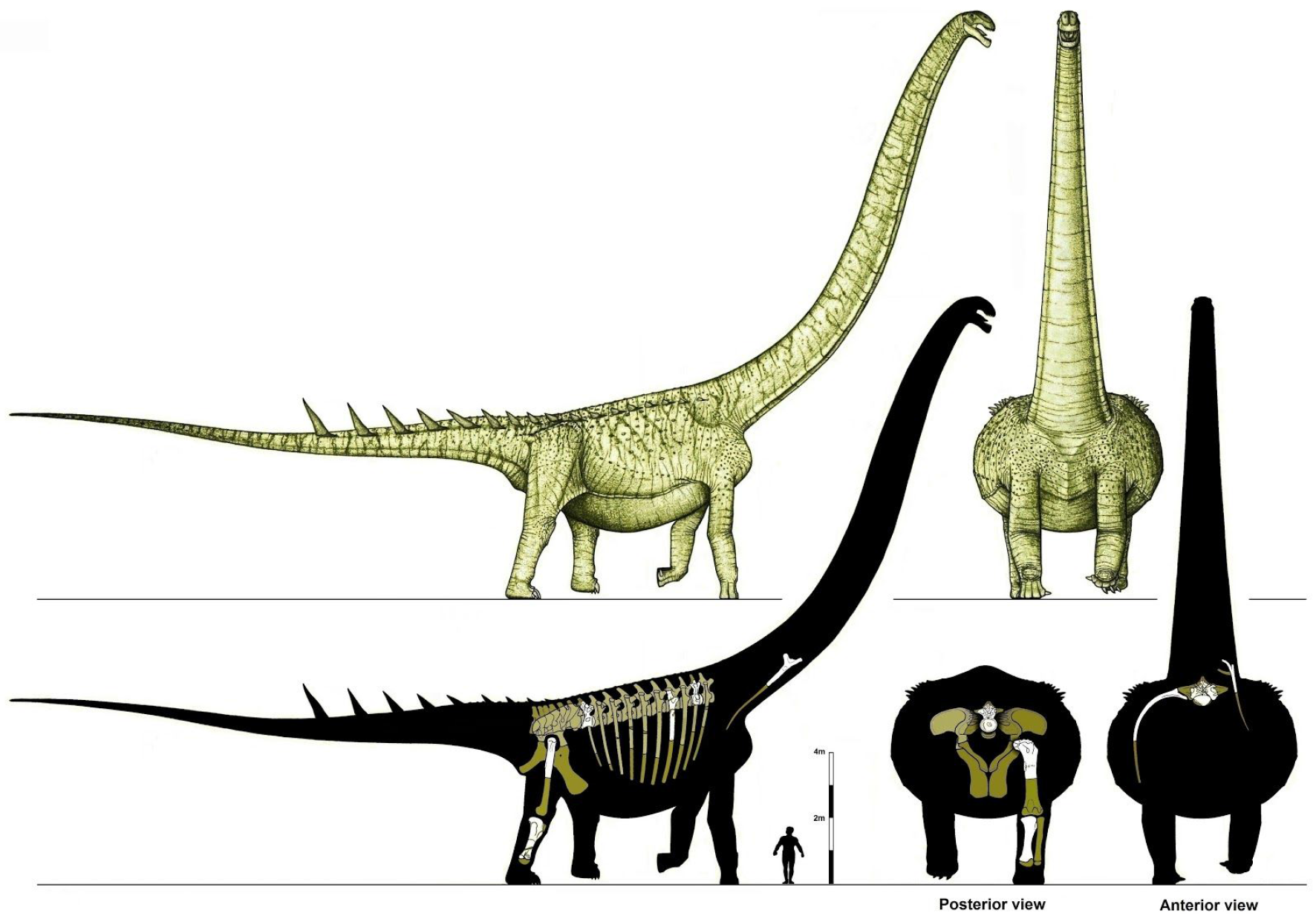
Skeletal and life restoration

== Classification ==
The describers of Ruyangosaurus assigned it to Andesauridae. However, Andesauridae is not monophyletic and, as such, is no longer used.

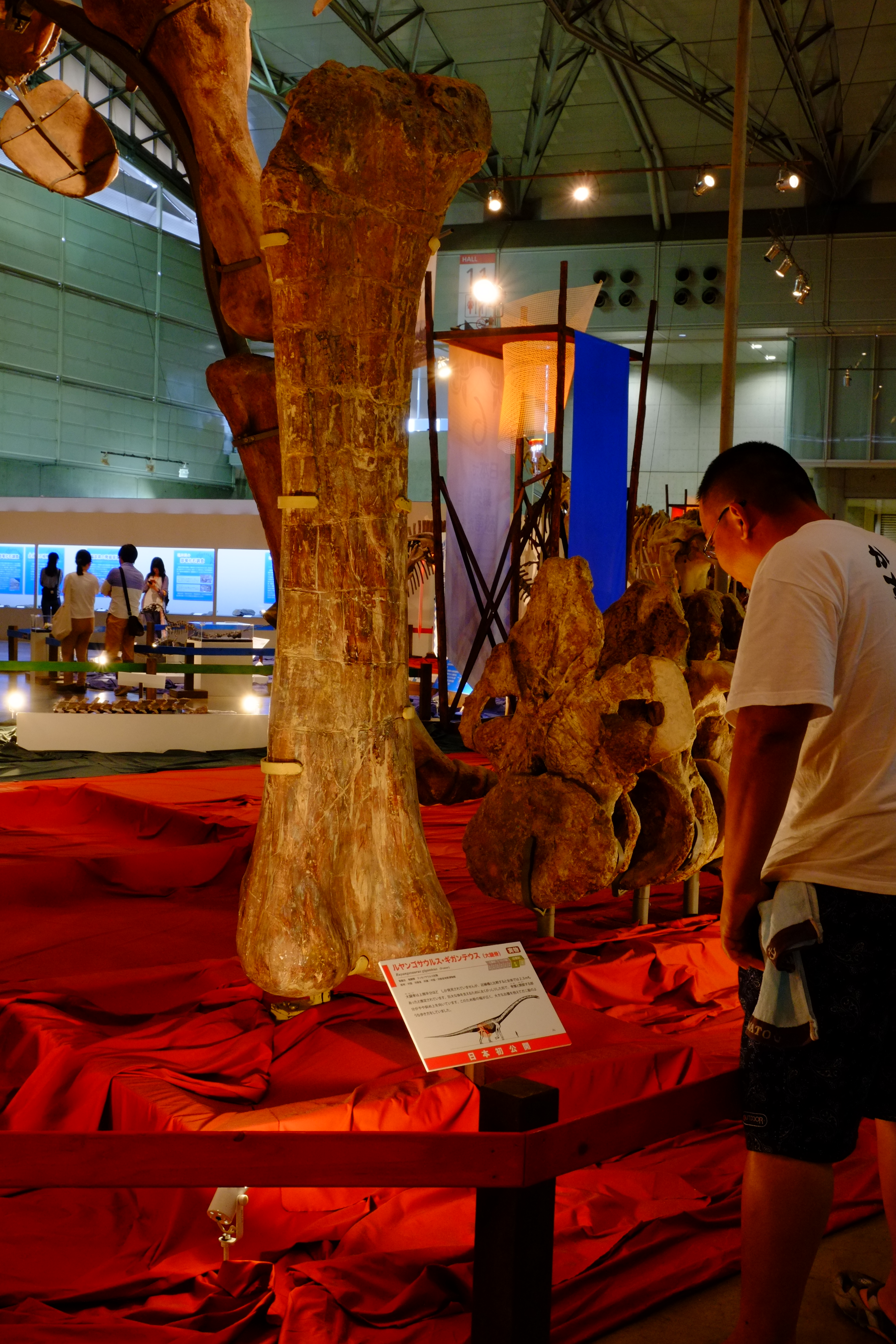
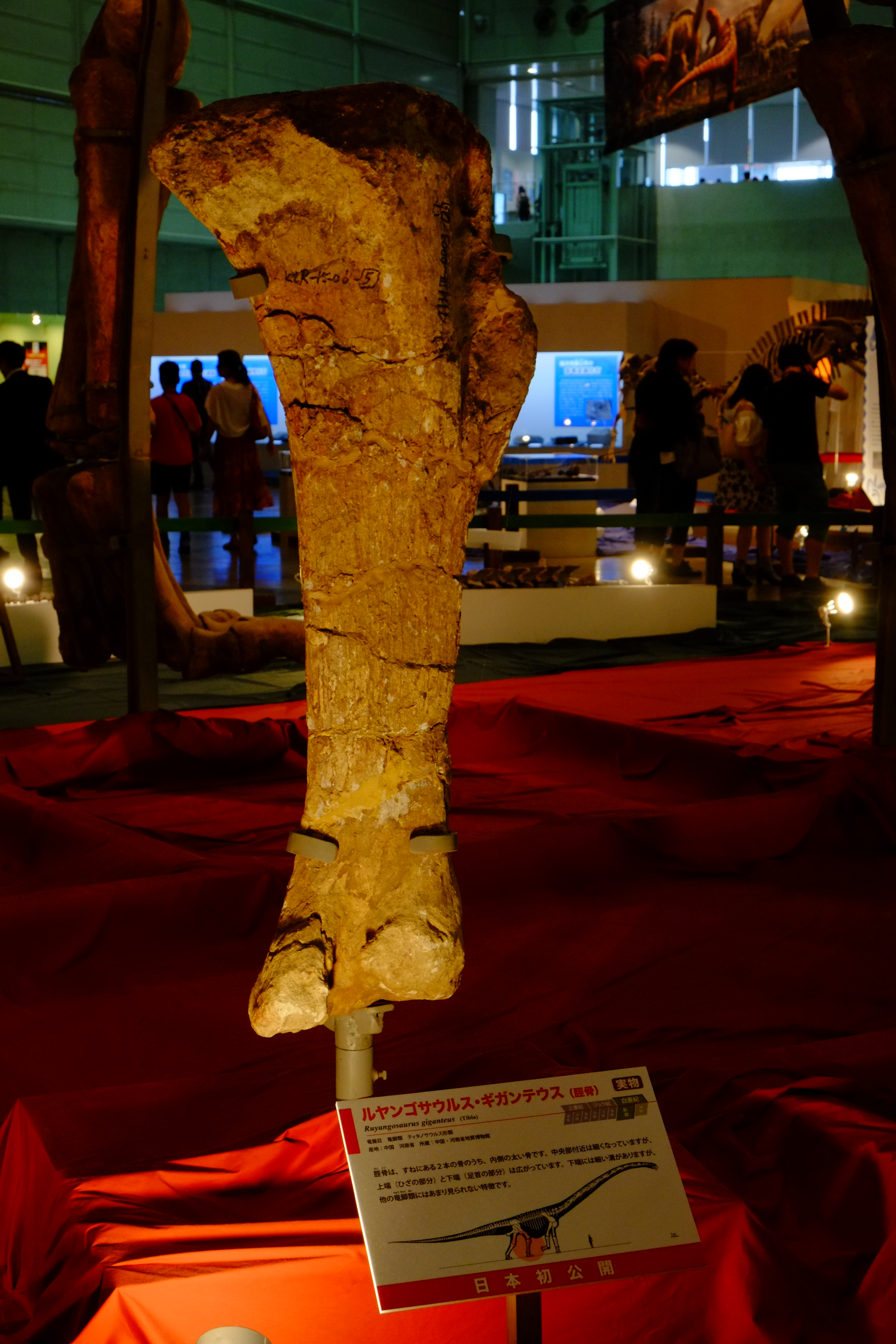
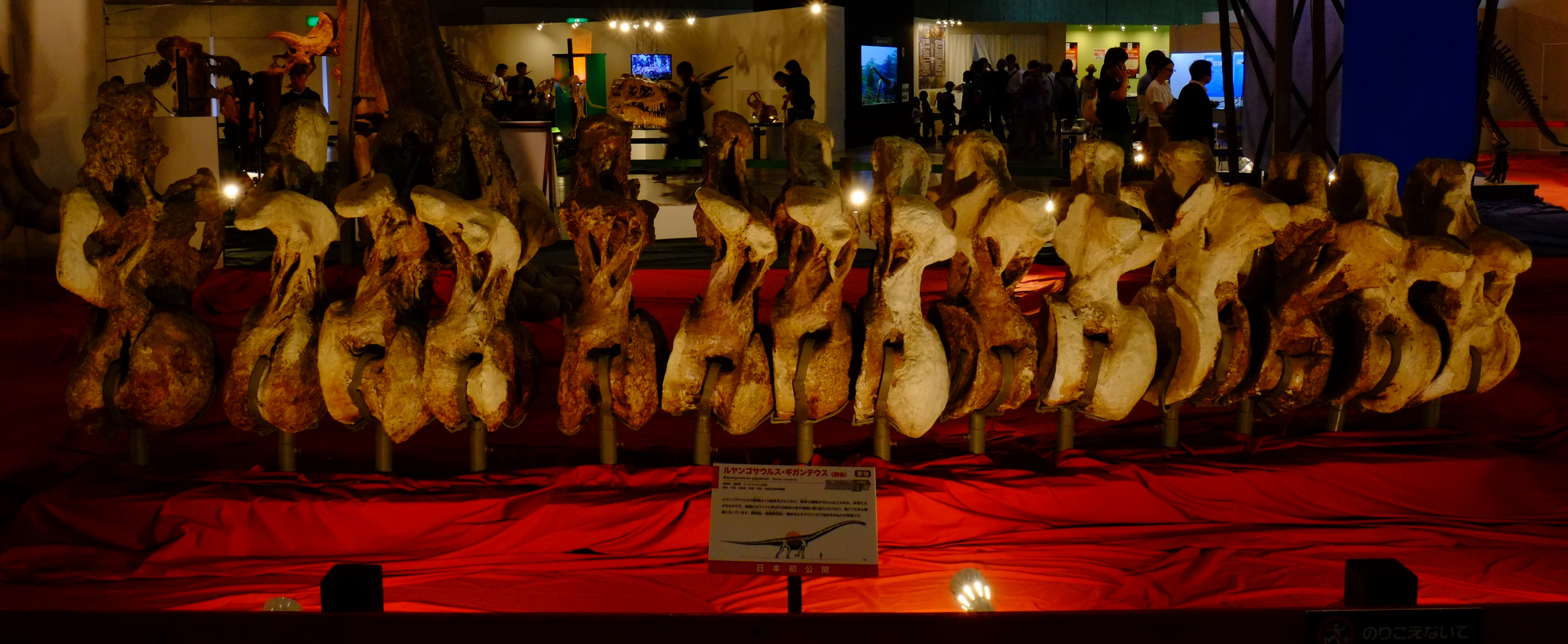
Femur (left), tibia (right), dorsal vertebrae (bottom).

Comprehensive phylogenetic analyses of Titanosauriformes conducted by Philip Mannion and colleagues in 2013 found Ruyangosaurus to be in a polytomy with Andesaurus and other basal titanosaurs and near-titanosaur somphospondyls, supporting the original description's assertion of phylogenetic proximity of it and Andesaurus, though not the precise taxonomic assignment, with further modifications of the dataset resolving similar conclusions. However, not all phylogenetic analyses have supported its position as a somphospondyl. A phylogenetic dataset following the description of additional material for Ruyangosaurus to be a non-titanosauriform macronarian, closely related to Yunmenglong.

The phylogenetic analysis of Mannion et al. in 2019 incorporated these updated discoveries into their earlier analysis, along with additional new knowledge for other mid-Cretaceous Asian taxa considered close to Titanosauria. They found Ruyangosaurus to either be close to Andesaurus as a basal titanosaur when all characters were considered equally important, or in a large clade of early titanosaurs potentially given the name Euhelopodidae related to taxa like Yongjinglong and Huanghetitan ruyangensis. Two trees of the results are shown below, equal weighting displaying the results of basal titanosauria, and relationships within Euhelopodidae of extended-implied weighting with a mild down-weighting of highly variable characters (k=9).

- Titanosauria
  - Andesaurus
  - - Ruyangosaurus
    - - - Daxiatitan
        - Xianshanosaurus
      - Lithostrotia

- Euhelopodidae
  - - Phuwiangosaurus
    - Tangvayosaurus
  - - Qiaowanlong
    - - - Euhelopus
        - - Erketu
          - Gobititan
      - - Huanghetitan ruyangensis
        - Yongjinglong
        - Ruyangosaurus

== Habitat ==
Ruyangosaurus shared its habitat with Xianshanosaurus, "Huanghetitan" ruyangensis, Yunmenglong, Luoyanggia, and Zhongyuansaurus. The horizon of Ruyangosaurus was originally described as being of "early Late Cretaceous" age, but recent work has assigned it an Aptian-Albian Age based on fieldwork and analysis of invertebrate and microfossil assemblages.

== See also ==
- List of dinosaurs
- 2009 in paleontology
