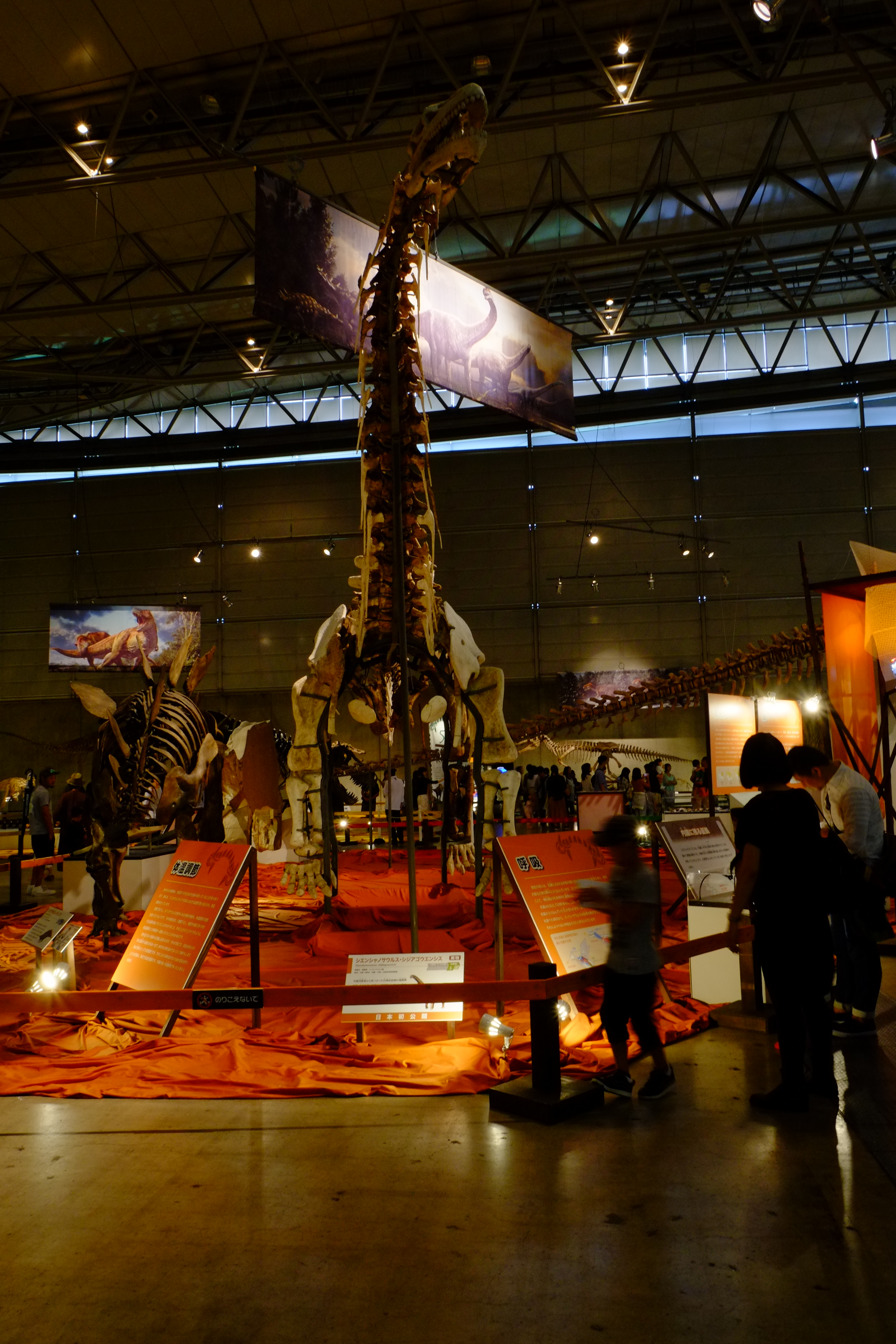
- Reconstructed skeleton

Scientific classification
- Kingdom: Animalia
- Phylum: Chordata
- Class: Reptilia
- Clade: Dinosauria
- Clade: Saurischia
- Clade: †Sauropodomorpha
- Clade: †Sauropoda
- Clade: †Macronaria
- Clade: †Titanosauriformes
- Clade: †Somphospondyli
- Genus: †Xianshanosaurus; Lü et al., 2009

Type species
- Xianshanosaurus shijiagouensis Lü et al., 2009

= Xianshanosaurus =

Xianshanosaurus Temporal range: Early Cretaceous, Aptian–Albian

Extinct genus of dinosaurs

Xianshanosaurus (Chinese: 岘山龙; pinyin: xiànshānlóng) is a genus of sauropod dinosaur from the Early Cretaceous (Aptian-Albian) of the Ruyang Basin in Henan Province, China. Its type and only species is Xianshanosaurus shijiagouensis. It was described in 2009 by a team of paleontologists led by Lü Junchang. Xianshanosaurus may be a titanosaur, and Daxiatitan may be its closest relative, but its evolutionary relationships remain controversial.

== Taxonomy ==
Xianshanosaurus and its type species X. shijiagouensis were named by Lü Junchang, Xu Li, Jiang Xiaojun, Jia Songhai, Li Ming, Yuan Chongxi, Zhang Xingliao, and Ji Qiang in 2009. The type specimen, accessioned in the Henan Geological Museum, is a partial skeleton of an immature individual that consists of ten caudal vertebrae, a coracoid, a femur, and several ribs. The genus name refers to Xian Mountain (Chinese: 岘山; pinyin: xiànshān), located near where the holotype was found.

=== Phylogenetic relationships ===
When Xianshanosaurus was first described, its discoverers noted that it had an unusual mixture of characteristics of titanosaurs and non-titanosaurian sauropods, and classified it as an indeterminate neosauropod. In 2011, Philip Mannion and Jorge Calvo tentatively considered it a titanosaur, and in 2012, Michael D'Emic interpreted it as a lithostrotian titanosaur.

Studies that have included Xianshanosaurus in phylogenetic analyses have regarded it as an unstable taxon. In several studies, it has been recovered as a titanosaur either close to or within Lithostrotia, with Daxiatitan sometimes recovered as its sister taxon. In contrast, Andrew Moore and colleagues found it to be highly unstable, potentially belonging to Titanosauria, Turiasauria, or Euhelopodidae. In the third case, in which Euhelopodidae was recovered as a non-neosauropod clade equivalent to Mamenchisauridae, Moore et al. recovered Daxiatitan as the sister taxon of Xianshanosaurus.

== Description ==
Xianshanosaurus was a large sauropod, but significantly smaller than its contemporaries Ruyangosaurus and Huanghetitan. The teeth are spoon-shaped and lack denticles, similar to those of Euhelopus, and had a distinct ridge on their lingual surface (the side facing the tongue). The caudal vertebrae are procoelous, a feature characteristic of titanosaurs, in which the vertebrae have strongly concave anterior faces and strongly convex posterior faces forming ball-and-socket articulations between the vertebrae. The caudal ribs are slightly curved forward. Unlike titanosaurs, the dorsal ribs do not have pneumatic openings and the haemal arches have a closed canal.

== Habitat ==
Xianshanosaurus shared its habitat with Ruyangosaurus, "Huanghetitan" ruyangensis, Yunmenglong, Luoyanggia, and Zhongyuansaurus. The Haoling Formation was initially thought to be Cenomanian in age, but is now considered Aptian-Albian.
