= Baishu Township =

Baishu Township 柏树乡
- Rural Township
- Bǎishù Xiāng
- Location in Henan Location in China
- Coordinates: 34°08′08″N 112°23′02″E
- Country: People's Republic of China
- Province: Henan
- Prefecture-level city: Luoyang
- County: Ruyang

Area
  - Total: 69.67 km^{2} (26.90 sq mi)

Population (2010)
  - Total: 23,294
  - Density: 334.4/km^{2} (866/sq mi)
- Time zone: UTC+8 (China Standard)

Baishu Township (Chinese: 柏树乡; pinyin: Bǎishù Xiāng) is a rural township located in Ruyang County, Luoyang, Henan, China. According to the 2010 census, Baishu Township had a population of 23,294, including 12,046 males and 11,248 females. The population was distributed as follows: 6,329 people aged under 14, 15,067 people aged between 15 and 64, and 1,898 people aged over 65.

== See also ==
- List of township-level divisions of Henan
