= Haoling Formation =

Geologic formation in Henan, China

- Stratigraphic range: Aptian–Albian
- Type: Geological formation
- Underlies: Shangdonggou Formation
- Overlies: Xiahedong Formation

Lithology
- Primary: Siltstone
- Other: Mudstone, Shale

Location
- Coordinates: 34.1°N 112.5°E
- Approximate paleocoordinates: 30.8°N 126.2°E
- Region: Henan Province
- Country: China
- Extent: Ruyang Basin
- Haoling Formation (China) Haoling Formation (Henan)

The Haoling Formation is a Mesozoic geologic formation in the Ruyang Basin of Henan, Province, central China. Dinosaur remains are among the fossils that have been recovered from the formation.

The Haoling Formation was originally treated as part of the Mangchuan Formation and considered to be of Paleocene age before being recognized as Mesozoic in age. A 2012 paper divided the Mangchuan into the Xiahedong, Haoling, and Shangdonggou Formations, assigning the dinosaur-bearing horizon to the Haoling Formation and constraining the age of the Haoling as Aptian-Albian based on fieldwork and invertebrate and microfossil assemblages.

== Fossil content ==
Color key: Taxon / Reclassified taxon / Taxon falsely reported as present / Dubious taxon or junior synonym / Ichnotaxon / Ootaxon / Morphotaxon	Notes; Uncertain or tentative taxa are in small text; ~~crossed out~~ taxa are discredited.

=== Dinosaurs ===
Ornithischians of the Haoling Formation
Genus	Species	Location	Stratigraphic position	Material	Notes	Images
Iguanodontia Indet.	Indeterminate	Shaping Donggou, Liudian	Aptian to Albian	Nine nearly articulated anteromiddle caudal vertebrae	An indeterminate iguanodontia.	
Zhongyuansaurus	Z. junchangi	300 miles east of Zhongwa Village (17 meters south of the road), Liudian	Albian	A single partial skeleton consists of a right mandible, 14 free caudal vertebrae and seven fused caudal vertebrae forming the club 'handle', ten haemal arches, four ribs, the left humerus, one metatarsal, and 41 osteoderms.	A ankylosaurine ankylosaurid	
Zhongyuansaurus	Z. luoyangensis	Liufugou, Liudian	Albian	A partial skeleton consists of a nearly complete skull, fragments of the lower jaw, a cervical neural spine, dorsal vertebrae, caudal vertebrae, posterior caudal vertebral centra, fused distal caudal vertebrae, ribs, a humerus, both ischia, a pubis, and osteoderms	A ankylosaurine ankylosaurid	

==== Sauropods ====
Sauropods of the Haoling Formation
Genus	Species	Location	Stratigraphic position	Material	Notes	Images
Huanghetitan	H. ruyangensis	Liufugou, Liudian	Aptian to Albian	A partial skeleton consists of a nearly complete sacrum, ten proximal caudals, haemal arches, dorsal ribs, and an incomplete ischium.	A samphospondylian sauropod	
Ruyangosaurus	R. giganteus	Shengshuigou, Shaping village,	Aptian to Albian	A set of postcrania consists of femur, tibia, and dorsal vertebrae.	A giant titanosaurian sauropod	
Xianshanosaurus	X. shijiagouensis	Haoling Village, Liudian Town.	Aptian to Albian	A partial skeleton consists of ten caudal vertebrae, a coracoid, a femur, and several ribs.	A euhelopodid somphospondylian	
Yunmenglong	Y. ruyangensis	Huamiaogou Village, Liudian	Aptian to Albian	A set of postcrania consists of nine cervicals, a single dorsal, four caudals & a right femur.	A euhelopodid somphospondylian	

==== Theropods ====
Theropods of the Haoling Formation
Genus	Species	Location	Stratigraphic position	Material	Notes	Images
Carcharodontosauridae Indet.	Indeterminate	Haoling Village and Shijiagou quarry, Liudian	Aptian to Albian	Several teeth.	A carcharodontosaurid theropod	
Luoyanggia	L. liudianensis	Shijiagou quarry, Liudian	Aptian to Albian	A partial skeleton.	A oviraptorid oviraptorosaur	
Ornithomimidae Indet.	O. spp	Shijiagou quarry, Liudian	Aptian to Alban		A ornithomimid ornithomimosaur	
Spinosauridae Indet.	Indeterminate	Shijiagou quarry, Liudian	Aptian to Albian		A spinosaurid theropod	

== See also ==
- List of dinosaur-bearing rock formations
  - List of stratigraphic units with few dinosaur genera
