= Ruyang County =

Ruyang County 汝阳县
- County
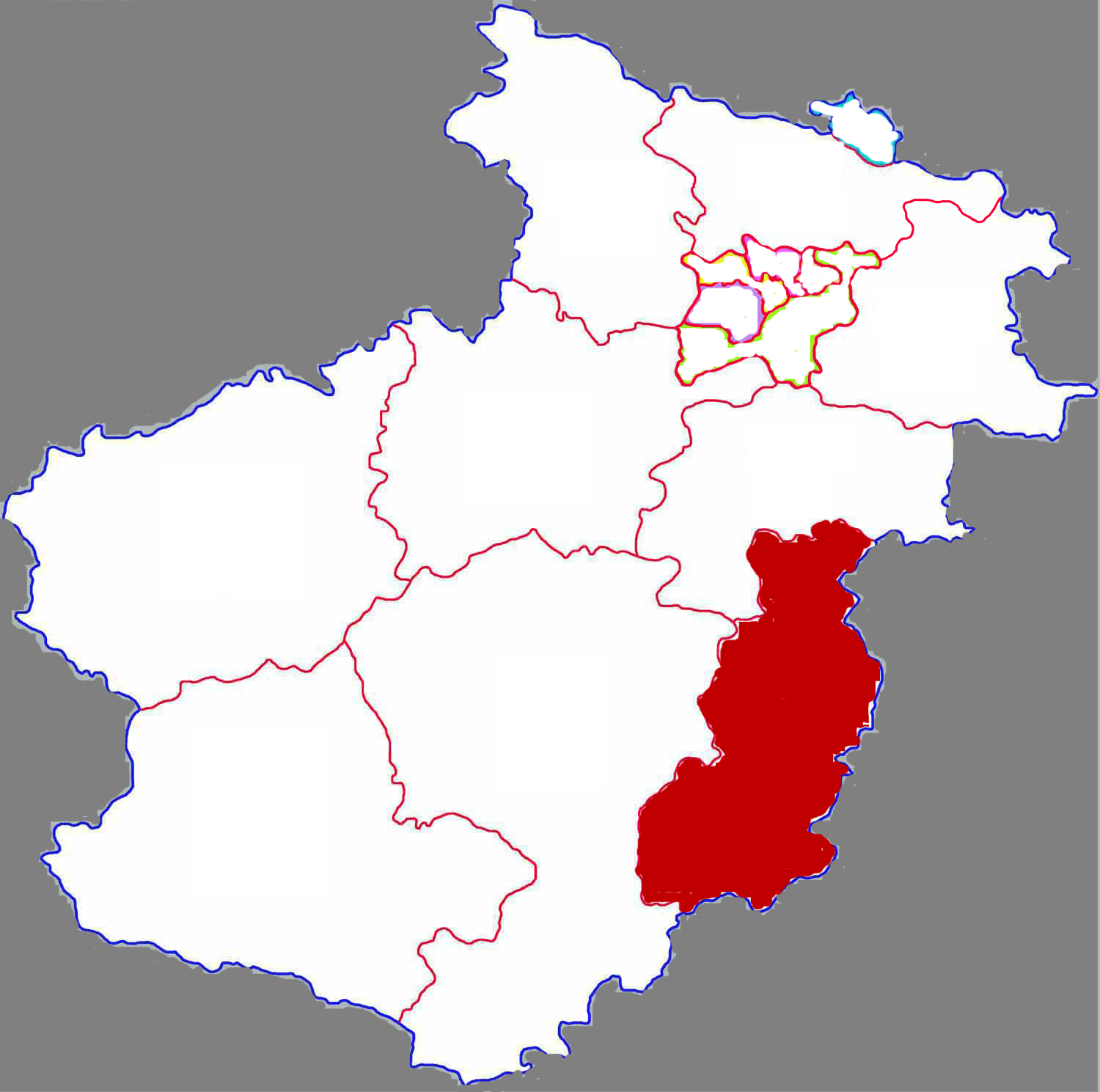
- Ruyang in Luoyang

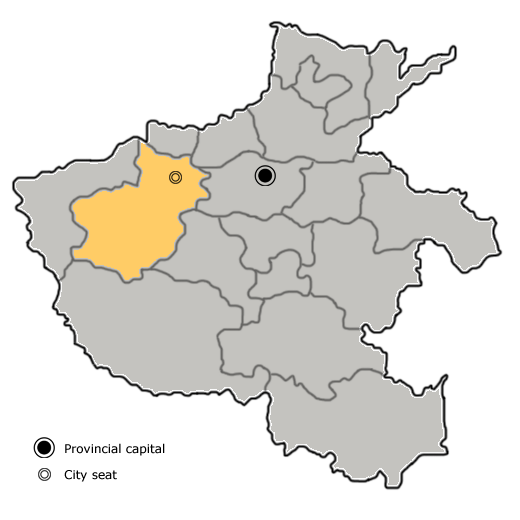
- Luoyang in Henan
- Coordinates: 34°09′14″N 112°28′23″E
- Country: People's Republic of China
- Province: Henan
- Prefecture-level city: Luoyang

Area
  - Total: 1,325 km^{2} (512 sq mi)

Population (2019)
  - Total: 428,900
  - Density: 323.7/km^{2} (838.4/sq mi)
- Time zone: UTC+8 (China Standard)
- Postal code: 471200

Ruyang County (simplified Chinese: 汝阳县; traditional Chinese: 汝陽縣; pinyin: Rǔyáng Xiàn) is a county in the west of Henan province, China, under the jurisdiction of the prefecture-level city of Luoyang.

Ruyang County has been the site of several major discoveries of fossilized dinosaur bones, including Huanghetitan ruyangensis, which was first described in 2007.

== Administrative divisions ==
As of 2012, this county is divided to 4 towns and 9 townships.

Towns

- Chengguan (城关镇)
- Shangdian (上店镇)
- Fudian (付店镇)
- Xiaodian (小店镇)

Townships

- Baishu Township (柏树乡)
- Shibapan Township (十八盘乡)
- Jincun Township (靳村乡)
- Wangping Township (王坪乡)
- Santun Township (三屯乡)
- Liudian Township (刘店乡)
- Taoying Township (陶营乡)
- Neibu Township (内埠乡)
- Caidian Township (蔡店乡)

== Name Confusion ==
In 1959, due to the fact that the Yihe River basin of the former Yiyang Commandery now belongs to Song County and Yichuan County (at that time, the county seat of Yiyang County was located on the northern bank of the Beiru River, a tributary of the Sha River, and close to Ruzhou), Yiyang was originally under the jurisdiction of Ruzhou. However, the name "Yiyang" was easily confused with the nearby Yiyang County due to their similar pronunciation. Therefore, the county was renamed Ruyang County, but this also caused confusion with Runan County, located along the Beiru River (a tributary of the Ru River), which was historically called "Ruyang County" during the Qing dynasty.

== Population ==
According to the Seventh National Population Census bulletin of Luoyang City, Henan Province, Ruyang County has a permanent resident population of 434,770 people. Males account for 50.22% of the population, females 49.78%. The age structure is as follows: 0–14 years old 27.08%, 15–59 years old 54.97%, 60 years and above 17.95%, and 65 years and above 12.64%.

== Geography ==
Ruyang County is located in the southeastern part of Luoyang City, within the Western Henan Mountains region, situated between the Funiu Mountains and the Song Mountains. The Beiru River, a tributary of the Sha River, flows through the county. Coordinates range from 112°08′ to 112°38′ E longitude and 33°49′ to 34°21′ N latitude.

The terrain is distributed in steps from south to north. The southern part is mountainous with steep peaks, with the highest peak being Jiguan Mountain at an elevation of 1,602 meters. The central part is characterized by undulating hills, and the northern part consists of plains and hills. The lowest point is at the bottom of the Dukang River at 220 meters above sea level. The county is known as "Seven Mountains, Two Ridges, One Division Plain." The average elevation is 543 meters, with an annual precipitation of 690.3 millimeters. Major rivers include the Beiru River and Dukang River, among 22 rivers in total, which belong to the Huai River and Yellow River basins.

== History ==
During the Tang dynasty, Yiyang County was established under the jurisdiction of Ruzhou. In the Five Dynasties period, it was abolished by the Later Zhou dynasty. In the early Ming dynasty, the area belonged to Song County. In the twelfth year of the Chenghua era (1476), Yiyang County was re-established by partitioning eastern Song County and western Ruzhou, under the direct jurisdiction of Ruzhou Prefecture. During the Qing dynasty and early Republican period, it remained under Ruzhou jurisdiction.

== Climate ==
Climate data for Ruyang, elevation 337 m (1,106 ft), (1991–2020 normals, extremes 1981–2010)
Month	Jan	Feb	Mar	Apr	May	Jun	Jul	Aug	Sep	Oct	Nov	Dec	Year
Record high °C (°F)	21.0 (69.8)	24.1 (75.4)	30.5 (86.9)	36.8 (98.2)	39.5 (103.1)	41.1 (106.0)	39.8 (103.6)	39.9 (103.8)	37.9 (100.2)	34.1 (93.4)	27.1 (80.8)	24.2 (75.6)	41.1 (106.0)
Mean daily maximum °C (°F)	6.5 (43.7)	9.8 (49.6)	15.5 (59.9)	22.5 (72.5)	27.5 (81.5)	31.5 (88.7)	31.8 (89.2)	30.3 (86.5)	26.2 (79.2)	21.2 (70.2)	14.4 (57.9)	8.6 (47.5)	20.5 (68.9)
Daily mean °C (°F)	1.2 (34.2)	4.2 (39.6)	9.5 (49.1)	15.9 (60.6)	21.3 (70.3)	25.6 (78.1)	26.9 (80.4)	25.4 (77.7)	20.9 (69.6)	15.5 (59.9)	8.9 (48.0)	3.2 (37.8)	14.9 (58.8)
Mean daily minimum °C (°F)	−2.9 (26.8)	−0.3 (31.5)	4.5 (40.1)	10.2 (50.4)	15.6 (60.1)	20.2 (68.4)	22.8 (73.0)	21.7 (71.1)	16.7 (62.1)	11.0 (51.8)	4.5 (40.1)	−0.9 (30.4)	10.3 (50.5)
Record low °C (°F)	−18.6 (−1.5)	−17.7 (0.1)	−11.4 (11.5)	−2.1 (28.2)	4.5 (40.1)	10.2 (50.4)	14.4 (57.9)	12.5 (54.5)	7.4 (45.3)	−3.0 (26.6)	−7.3 (18.9)	−11.9 (10.6)	−18.6 (−1.5)
Average precipitation mm (inches)	13.2 (0.52)	16.4 (0.65)	26.5 (1.04)	43.7 (1.72)	62.0 (2.44)	67.5 (2.66)	123.0 (4.84)	107.4 (4.23)	92.7 (3.65)	42.4 (1.67)	30.8 (1.21)	9.1 (0.36)	634.7 (24.99)
Average precipitation days (≥ 0.1 mm)	4.4	4.8	6.3	6.7	7.9	8.0	11.1	11.1	9.7	7.4	5.9	3.7	87
Average snowy days	4.7	3.6	1.8	0.2	0	0	0	0	0	0	1.3	3.4	15
Average relative humidity (%)	55	57	58	59	58	61	74	77	73	66	62	54	63
Mean monthly sunshine hours	149.8	144.1	176.7	207.7	215.5	206.9	186.2	180.3	162.5	164.1	153.3	159.3	2,106.4
Percentage possible sunshine	48	46	47	53	50	48	43	44	44	47	50	52	48
Source: China Meteorological Administration

== Culture and Tourism ==
=== Dukang Liquor ===
According to legend, Ruyang County is the birthplace of Chinese baijiu (white liquor). The "Gazetteer of Yiyang County" from the Daoguang period of the Qing dynasty records that "it is popularly said that Dukang first brewed liquor here." The "Dukang Spring" located in Caidian Township is a natural mineral spring suitable for brewing. Dukang Liquor Factory in Ruyang was once the county's primary economic pillar, producing the "Dukang Liquor" brand series which enjoyed good sales nationwide; it is now owned by a company from Luoyang. In the late 1980s, the local government invested in producing a three-episode TV drama called "The Ancestral Wine" (酒宗), themed on Dukang's brewing history, scripted by local literati Chen Wuji and starring then-popular actor Hu Yajie.

In recent years, Ruyang County has been seeking economic development through tourism, focusing on attractions such as Dukang Xianzhuang (仙庄), the Dukang Brewing Site, Dukang Temple, the Ghost Valley Homeland, the Tomb of Wei Mingdi, the Ancient Military Academy Site of Yunmeng Mountain, and the original ecological tourism zone of West Taishan, among others.

Ruyang is not the only claimant to being the origin of Dukang liquor; neighboring Yichuan County in Luoyang and Baishui County in Shaanxi Province also produce "Dukang" baijiu and claim to be the true source. After merging Yichuan and Ruyang's Dukang brands, Luoyang faced trademark infringement litigation from Baishui and lost.

=== Eight Scenic Spots of Ruyang ===
- Fengshan Chaoyang (Phoenix Mountain Sunrise)
- Ruiyun Pingzhang (Auspicious Clouds and Screen-like Mountains)
- Xianshan Diecui (Mount Xian's Layered Greenery)
- Longya Yeyu (Dragon Cliff's Night Rain)
- Yunmeng Xianjing (Cloud Dream Fairyland)
- Taoyuan Shengji (Peach Blossom Wonderland)
- Ziluo Shitan (Purple Lo Stone Pool)
- Rushui Tuolan (Ru River's Blue Stretch)

=== Ruyang Dinosaurs ===
Since 2005, a dense distribution of dinosaur fossils has been discovered in Ruyang County, with six relatively complete dinosaur fossils excavated and over 90 fossil sites identified. The known dinosaur types include six species: Ruyang Yellow River Giant, giant sauropods, medium sauropods, armored ankylosaurs (known as Luoyang Zhongyuan Dinosaur), bird-like dinosaurs, and large carnivorous theropods. Notably, the "Ruyang Yellow River Giant," excavated from Liufugou Village in Liudian Township, measures 18 meters in length and 6 meters in shoulder height, making it the largest known dinosaur in Asia. Another species, the "Luoyang Zhongyuan Dinosaur," found locally and measuring 5 meters in length, is the only large nodosaurid ankylosaur with conclusive evidence found in China.

In September 2008, the "Ruyang Dinosaur Fossil Provincial Geopark" was established, comprising two main parks (Dinosaur Fossil Park and West Taishan Park) and five scenic spots including Dinosaur Fossil Group, Phoenix Mountain, Yuma Lake, Yanhuang Peak, and Shilong Valley. Covering a total area of 218 square kilometers, the park focuses on dinosaur fossils and granite landforms, supplemented by typical stratigraphic profiles, combining ecological and cultural elements in an integrated geological park.

== Local Products ==
- Lead and zinc mines: Ruyang County has lead and zinc ore reserves of 1.68 million tons, ranking first in Henan Province.
- Molybdenum mines: Ruyang is one of the country's important molybdenum mining areas. Donggou Village in Fudian Town is one of the national major molybdenum mining zones. However, due to poor management, large-scale illegal mining occurred over many years, causing serious surface collapses. On June 29, 2007, a surface collapse at 2 a.m. resulted in significant casualties and property loss. The giant molybdenum deposit in Fudian Township is estimated at 500,000–800,000 tons and is expected to become the second largest molybdenum mining area in Henan Province.
- Plum Blossom Jade (also known as Ruyang Jade): Currently only produced in Shangdian Town, characterized by a black base with colorful patterns resembling falling flowers and broken clouds. Historically, Emperor Guangwu of the Han dynasty Liu Xiu regarded this jade as a "national treasure," suitable for making fitness balls, jade bracelets, tea sets, wine vessels, stationery, and other crafts.
