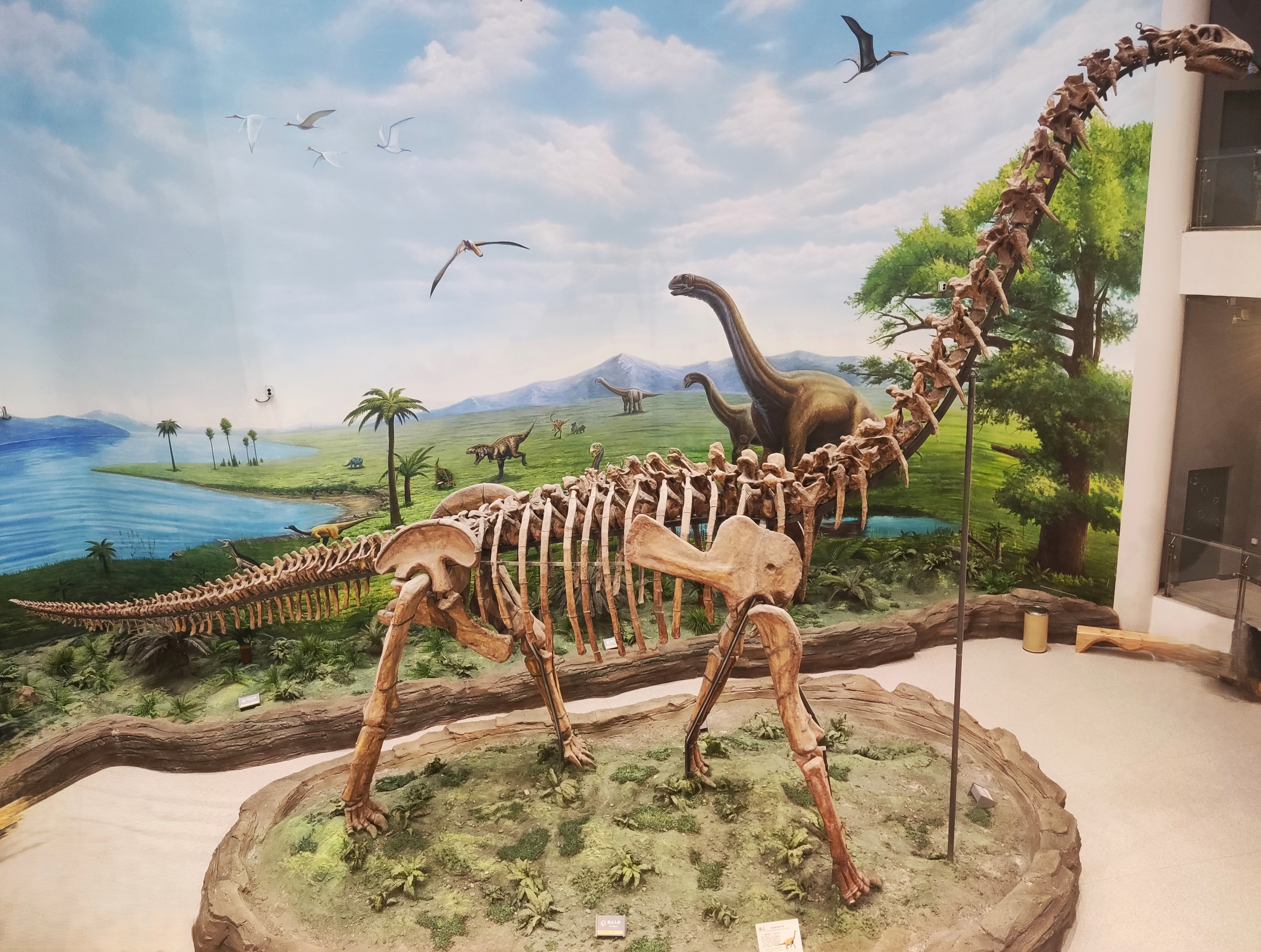
- Reconstructed skeleton of Huanghetitan liujiaxiaensis

Scientific classification
- Kingdom: Animalia
- Phylum: Chordata
- Class: Reptilia
- Clade: Dinosauria
- Clade: Saurischia
- Clade: †Sauropodomorpha
- Clade: †Sauropoda
- Clade: †Macronaria
- Clade: †Titanosauriformes
- Clade: †Somphospondyli
- Genus: †Huanghetitan; You et al., 2006

Type species
- †Huanghetitan liujiaxiaensis You et al., 2006

Other species
- †H. ruyangensis Lü et al., 2007

= Huanghetitan =

Huanghetitan Temporal range: Early Cretaceous, Aptian–Albian

Extinct genus of dinosaurs

Huanghetitan (meaning "Yellow River titan"), is a genus of sauropod dinosaur from the early Cretaceous Period. It was a basal titanosauriform which lived in what is now Gansu, China.

== History ==
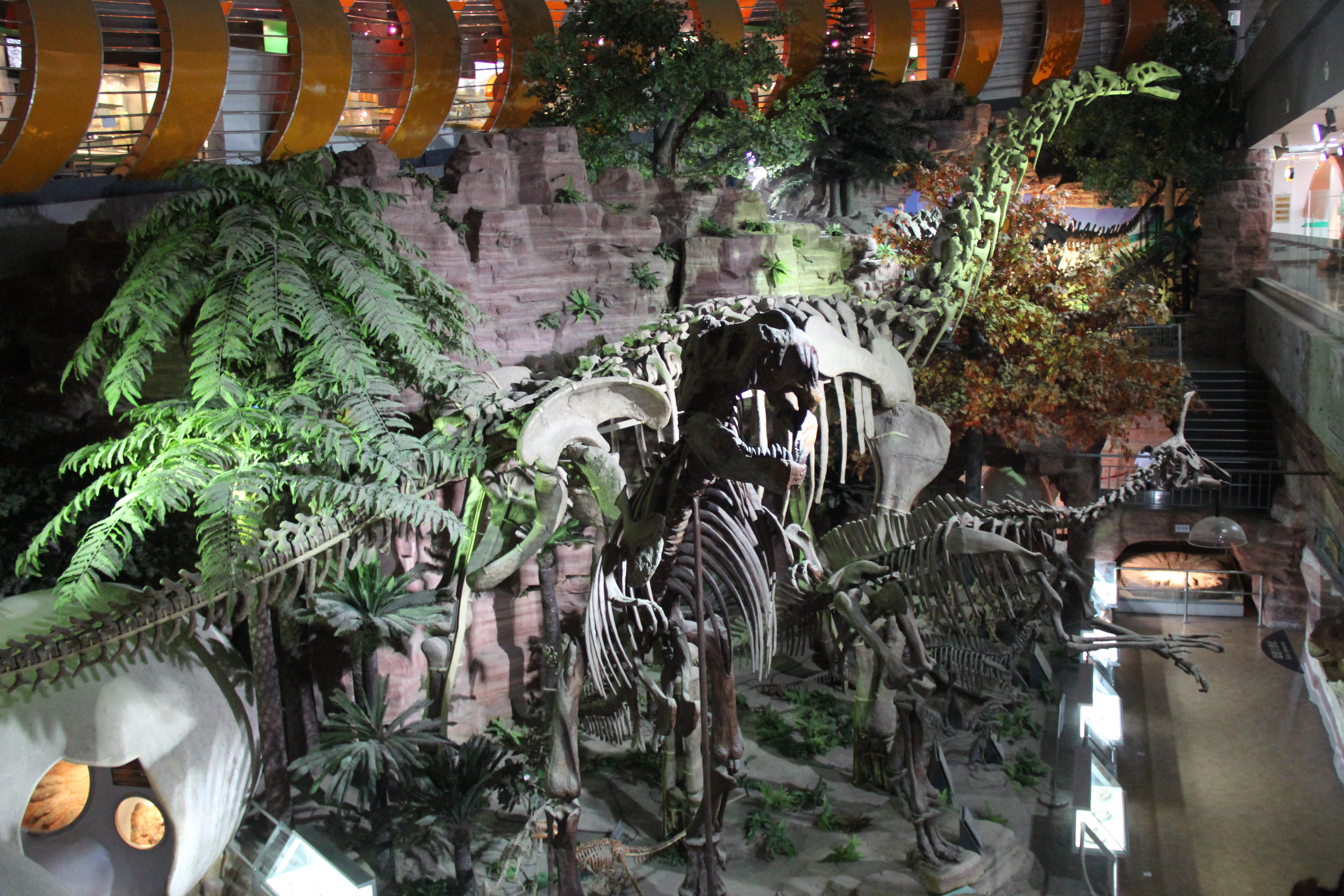
Hind view of skeleton, Henan Geological Museum

The type species, Huanghetitan liujiaxiaensis, was described by You et al. in 2006. It is known from fragmentary materials including two caudal vertebrae, an almost complete sacrum, rib fragments, and the left shoulder girdle, and was discovered in the eastern part of the Lanzhou Basin (Hekou Group) in the Gansu Province in 2004.

A second species, H. ruyangensis, was described in 2007 from the Aptian-Albian Haoling Formation of Ruyang County, China (Henan Province). A recent cladistic analysis has found that this species is unlikely to be closely related to H. liujiaxiaensis and requires a new genus name.

== Description ==
Size estimation of Huanghetitan ruyangensis

H. liujiaxiaensis is a relatively small sauropod, measuring 12 metres (39 ft) long and weighing 3 metric tons (3.3 short tons). H. ruyangensis is known from a partial vertebral column and several ribs, the size of which (the largest approaches 3 metres (9.8 ft) in length) indicates it had among the deepest body cavities of any known dinosaur. This second species, along with its local relatives Daxiatitan and Ruyangosaurus, is one of the biggest dinosaurs ever found in Asia, and possibly one of the largest in the world. In 2019, Gregory S. Paul suggested that the dorsal rib of H. ruyangensis is about the same length as the titanosaur Patagotitan, and its sacrum may be similar in length, possibly suggesting a similar mass range of 45–55 metric tons (50–61 short tons).

In 2007, Lü Junchang et al. created a new family for Huanghetitan, the Huangetitanidae, but this family found to be polyphyletic by Mannion et al.

The following is a cladogram from Averianov et al., 2017, based on the work of Mannion et al., showing Huanghetitan as a paraphyletic genus with "H." ruyangensis being closer to Titanosauria:

- Somphospondyli
  - Dongbeititan
  - - - Liubangosaurus
      - Pelorosaurus
      - Euhelopodidae
    - - Astrophocaudia
      - - Brontomerus
        - - Chubutisaurus
          - - Angolatitan
            - - Tastavinsaurus
              - - Malarguesaurus
                - - - - Paluxysaurus
                      - Sauroposeidon
                    - - Clovery Titanosauriform (YPM 5449)
                      - Fukuititan
                      - Ligabuesaurus
                  - - Sibirotitan
                    - - - Ruyangosaurus
                        - Wintonotitan
                      - - Huanghetitan
                        - - Huanghetitan ruyangensis
                          - Titanosauria
