= Yunmenglong =

Yunmenglong Temporal range: Early Cretaceous, 125–100.5 Ma

Scientific classification
- Kingdom: Animalia
- Phylum: Chordata
- Class: Reptilia
- Clade: Dinosauria
- Clade: Saurischia
- Clade: †Sauropodomorpha
- Clade: †Sauropoda
- Clade: †Macronaria
- Clade: †Somphospondyli
- Genus: †Yunmenglong; Lü et al., 2013

Type species
- †Yunmenglong ruyangensis Lü et al., 2013

Extinct genus of reptiles

Yunmenglong (meaning "Yunmeng dragon", after the Yunmengshan area where it was found) is an extinct genus of somphospondylan sauropod known from the late Early Cretaceous of Henan Province, central China. Its remains were discovered in the Haoling Formation of the Ruyang Basin. The type species is Yunmenglong ruyangensis, described in 2013 by Junchang Lü et al. on the basis of an incomplete postcranial skeleton. Yunmenglong shares some characters with Euhelopus, Qiaowanlong, and Erketu; a phylogenetic analysis places it as a sister taxon of Qiaowanlong, both grouped with Erketu in a position more derived than Euhelopus but basal to Titanosauria.

== Size ==
Yunmenglong was a giant sauropod dinosaur, as evidenced by the complete right femur at about 1.92 m (6.3 ft) long and 65 cm (2.13 ft) in distal width, which is comparable to other giant Chinese genus, Fusuisaurus. In 2016, Paul estimated it at 20 m (66 ft) in length and 30 t (33 short tons) in weight. In 2020, Molina-Pérez and Larramendi gave a larger length of 27 m (89 ft) and a similar weight of 29 t (32 short tons).
