= List of Mesozoic bird-line archosaur genera (C–F) =

This list of Mesozoic bird-line archosaur genera is a comprehensive listing of all Mesozoic genera that are included in the clade Avemetatarsalia (alternatively known as Pan-Aves), including dinosaurs, pterosaurs, silesaurids, lagerpetids, and more basal genera. The list includes all commonly accepted genera whose names begin with the letters C–F. The list currently includes 341 genera.

== Scope and terminology ==
There is no official, canonical list of Mesozoic bird-line archosaur genera, but thorough attempts have been made for its various subgroups, such as George Olshevsky's Dinosaur Genera List, the book The Dinosauria, Mikko Haaramo's Phylogeny Archive, Mike Hanson's The Pterosauria, the Pterosaur Species List, Donald F. Glut's Dinosaurs: The Encyclopedia series, Holtz's list of Mesozoic dinosaurs, Molina-Perez & Larramendi's list of theropods, and Mickey Mortimer's Theropod Database. These lists have been supplemented with more recent publications to create this one.

- Genus: The generic name of the taxon, sourced to its description publication.
- Authors: Full names of the authors of the descriptions. This column can be sorted by last names.
- Year: The year when the descriptions were physically published. These are not necessarily the years the names became valid according to the rules of the International Commission on Zoological Nomenclature (ICZN).
- Formation: The geological formations each taxon was found in, along with their epoch and age. In the case of multiple formations, holotype localities are marked by an asterisk.
- Location: Every country and first-level subdivision the taxon was found in. In the case of multiple locations, holotype localities are marked by an asterisk.

== The list ==
Genus	Authors	Year	Formation	Location	Notes	Images
Cacibupteryx	Zulma Gasparini; Marta Fernández; Marcelo de la Fuente	2004	Jagua Formation (Late Jurassic, Oxfordian)	Cuba (Pinar del Río)	One of the few Mesozoic vertebrates known from the Caribbean	
Caelestiventus	Brooks B. Britt; Fabio M. Dalla Vecchia; Daniel J. Chure; George F. Engelmann; Michael F. Whiting; Rodney D. Scheetz	2018	Nugget Sandstone (Late Triassic, Norian)	United States (Utah)	The oldest known desert-dwelling pterosaur	
Caenagnathasia	Philip J. Currie; Stephen J. Godfrey; Lev A. Nessov	1993	Bissekty Formation (Late Cretaceous, Turonian)	Uzbekistan (Navoiy)	One of the oldest and smallest known caenagnathoids	
Caenagnathus	R. M. Sternberg	1940	Dinosaur Park Formation (Late Cretaceous, Campanian)	Canada (Alberta)	A very large caenagnathid	
Caieiria	Julian C.G. Silva Junior; Agustín G. Martinelli; Thiago S. Marinho; João I. da Silva; Max C. Langer	2022	Serra da Galga Formation (Late Cretaceous, Maastrichtian)	Brazil (Minas Gerais)	Had unusually shaped caudal vertebrae	
Caihong	Dongyu Hu; Julia A. Clarke; Chad M. Eliason; Rui Qiu; Quanguo Li; Matthew D. Shawkey; Cuilin Zhao; Liliana D'Alba; Jinkai Jiang; Xing Xu	2018	Tiaojishan Formation (Late Jurassic, Oxfordian)	China (Hebei)	Possessed platelet-shaped melanosomes that produced iridescence as in modern South American trumpeters	
Caiuajara	Paulo C. Manzig; Alexander W. A. Kellner; Luiz C. Weinschütz; Carlos E. Fragoso; Cristina S. Vega; Gilson B. Guimarães; Luiz C. Godoy; Antonio Liccardo; João H. Z. Ricetti; Camila C. de Moura	2014	Goio-Erê Formation (Early Cretaceous, Aptian to Albian)	Brazil (Paraná)	Multiple specimens of different age groups are known	
Calamosaurus	Richard Lydekker	1891	Wessex Formation (Early Cretaceous, Berriasian to Barremian)	England (Isle of Wight)	Only confidently known from two cervical vertebrae, with the several bones referred to it over the years having no proof they belonged to the same genus	
Calamospondylus	William Fox	1866	Wessex Formation (Early Cretaceous, Berriasian to Barremian)	England (Isle of Wight)	Its definite remains include a sacrum and associated pelvic elements	
Caletodraco	Eric Buffetaut; Haiyan Tong; Jérôme Girard; Bernard Hoyez; Javier Párraga	2024	Chalk of the Pays de Caux (Late Cretaceous, Cenomanian)	France (Normandy)	Possibly the first known non-South American furileusaurian abelisaurid	
Callovosaurus	Peter M. Galton	1980	Oxford Clay (Middle Jurassic, Callovian)	England (Cambridgeshire)	The oldest known dryosaurid	
Calvarius	Albert Prieto-Márquez; Albert G. Sellés	2022	Talarn Formation (Late Cretaceous, Maastrichtian)	Spain (Catalonia)	May have been a cursorial biped similar to basal ornithopods despite being more derived	
Camarasaurus	Edward D. Cope	1877	Morrison Formation (Late Jurassic, Kimmeridgian to Tithonian)	United States (Colorado*; Montana; New Mexico; South Dakota; Utah; Wyoming)	Very common and known from multiple specimens	
Camarillasaurus	Bárbara Sánchez-Hernández; Michael J. Benton	2014	Camarillas Formation (Early Cretaceous, Barremian)	Spain (Aragon)	Described as a ceratosaur but has since been reinterpreted as a spinosaurid	
Camelotia	Peter M. Galton	1985	Westbury Formation (Late Triassic, Rhaetian)	England (Gloucestershire)	One of the largest known non-sauropod sauropodomorphs	
Campananeyen	Lucas Nicolás Lerzo; Fidel Torcia Fernández-Baldor; Juan Ignacio Canale; John A. Whitlock; Alejandro Otero; Pablo Ariel Gallina	2025	Candeleros Formation (Late Cretaceous, Cenomanian)	Argentina (Neuquén)	Had a notably pneumatized ilium	
Camposaurus	Adrian P. Hunt; Spencer G. Lucas; Andrew B. Heckert; Robert M. Sullivan; Martin G. Lockley	1998	Bluewater Creek Formation (Late Triassic, Norian)	United States (Arizona)	Potentially the oldest known neotheropod	
Camposipterus	Taissa Rodrigues; Alexander W. A. Kellner	2013	Cambridge Greensand (Early Cretaceous, Albian)	England (Cambridgeshire)	One of the many species originally assigned to Ornithocheirus	
Camptodontornis	Vahe Demirjian	2019	Jiufotang Formation (Early Cretaceous, Aptian)	China (Liaoning)	Originally called Camptodontus, although that genus name is occupied by a beetle	
Camptosaurus	Othniel C. Marsh	1885	Morrison Formation (Kimmeridgian to Tithonian)	United States (Utah; Wyoming*)	May have fed on tough vegetation as evidenced by extensive wear frequently exhibited on its teeth	
Campylodoniscus	Hartmut Haubold; Oskar Kuhn	1961	Bajo Barreal Formation (Late Cretaceous, Cenomanian to Turonian)	Argentina (Chubut)	Only known from a single maxilla with seven teeth	
Campylognathoides	Embrik Strand	1928	Posidonia Shale (Early Jurassic, Toarcian)	Germany (Baden-Württemberg)	Had long wings and powerful shoulders that may suggest a fast aerial predatory lifestyle similar to falcons	
Canadaga	Lianhai Hou	1999	Kanguk Formation (Late Cretaceous, Maastrichtian)	Canada (Nunavut)	One of the largest and northernmost known hesperornitheans	
Canardia	Albert Prieto-Márquez; Fabio M. Dalla Vecchia; Rodrigo Gaete; Àngel Galobart	2013	Marnes d'Auzas Formation (Late Cretaceous, Maastrichtian)	France (Occitania)	May have been a close relative of Aralosaurus	
Carcharodontosaurus	Ernst Stromer	1931	Continental intercalaire (Late Cretaceous, Cenomanian); Douira Formation (Late Cretaceous, Cenomanian)*	Algeria (Timimoun); Morocco (Drâa-Tafilalet*)	One of the largest carnivorous dinosaurs	
Cardiodon	Richard Owen	1841	Forest Marble Formation (Middle Jurassic, Bathonian)	England (Wiltshire)	The first sauropod ever named, known only from a tooth	
Carniadactylus	Fabio M. Dalla Vecchia	2009	Calcare di Zorzino (Late Triassic, Norian); Forni Dolostone (Late Triassic, Norian)*	Italy (Friuli-Venezia Giulia*; Lombardy)	May have fed on worms and insect larvae, unlike larger pterosaurs	
Carnotaurus	José F. Bonaparte	1985	La Colonia Formation (Late Cretaceous, Maastrichtian)	Argentina (Chubut)	Possessed a pair of short horns on the top of its skull	
Cascocauda	Zixiao Yang; Michael J. Benton; David W. E. Hone; Xing Xu; Maria E. McNamara; Baoyu Jiang	2021	Tiaojishan Formation (Late Jurassic, Oxfordian)	China (Hebei)	Had branching filaments resembling, homologous with, or representing dinosaur-like primitive feathers	
Caseosaurus	Adrian P. Hunt; Spencer G. Lucas; Andrew B. Heckert; Robert M. Sullivan; Martin G. Lockley	1998	Tecovas Formation (Late Triassic, Norian)	United States (Texas)	Possibly synonymous with Chindesaurus	
Castignovolucris	Eric Buffetaut; Delphine Angst; Haiyan Tong	2023	Argiles et Grès à Reptiles Formation (Late Cretaceous, Campanian)	France (Occitania)	May have been the size of a Canada goose	
Catenoleimus	Andrey V. Panteleyev	1998	Bissekty Formation (Late Cretaceous, Turonian)	Uzbekistan (Navoiy)	Known from only a coracoid	
Cathartesaura	Pablo A. Gallina; Sebastián Apesteguía	2005	Huincul Formation (Late Cretaceous, Cenomanian to Turonian)	Argentina (Río Negro)	Had a well-muscled neck although it could not move strongly up or down	
Cathayopterus	Xiaolin Wang; Zhonghe Zhou	2006	Yixian Formation (Early Cretaceous, Barremian)	China (Liaoning)	Represents a radiation of pterosaurs from the Jehol Biota	
Cathayornis	Zhonghe Zhou; Fan Jin; Jiangyong Zhang	1992	Jiufotang Formation (Early Cretaceous, Aptian)	China (Liaoning)	May have had a similar appearance and lifestyle to a pitta	
Caudipteryx	Qiang Ji; Philip J. Currie; Mark A. Norell; Shu-An Ji	1998	Yixian Formation (Early Cretaceous, Barremian)	China (Liaoning)	Its mix of avian and non-avian features led to debates over the origin of birds	
Caulkicephalus	Lorna Steel; David M. Martill; David M. Unwin; John D. Winch	2005	Wessex Formation (Early Cretaceous, Barremian)	England (Isle of Wight)	Combines a Pteranodon-like cranial crest with the snout crests and teeth of anhanguerids	
Caupedactylus	Alexander W. A. Kellner	2012	Romualdo Formation (Early Cretaceous, Albian)	Brazil (Ceará)	Its skull combines features of thalassodromids, tapejarines, and non-pterodactyloids	
Caviramus	Nadia B. Fröbisch; Jorg Fröbisch	2006	Kössen Formation (Late Triassic, Rhaetian)	Switzerland (Grisons)	May have been a herbivore or omnivore, a rarity for basal pterosaurs	
Cearadactylus	Giuseppe Leonardi; Guido Borgomanero	1985	Romualdo Formation (Early Cretaceous, Albian)	Brazil (Ceará)	Its skull was once incorrectly reconstructed as having outward-curving notches on its snout tip	
Cedarosaurus	Virginia Tidwell; Kenneth Carpenter; William Brooks	1999	Cedar Mountain Formation (Early Cretaceous, Berriasian to Valanginian)	United States (Utah)	One specimen preserves over a hundred gastroliths	
Cedarpelta	Kenneth Carpenter; James I. Kirkland; Donald L. Burge; John Bird	2001	Cedar Mountain Formation (Early Cretaceous to Late Cretaceous, Albian to Cenomanian)	United States (Utah)	Lacked the extensive cranial ornamentation of later ankylosaurids	
Cedrorestes	David Gilpin; Tony DiCroce; Kenneth Carpenter	2007	Cedar Mountain Formation (Early Cretaceous, Berriasian to Valanginian)	United States (Utah)	The specific name, crichtoni, honors Michael Crichton, author of Jurassic Park and The Lost World	
Centrosaurus	Lawrence M. Lambe	1904	Dinosaur Park Formation (Late Cretaceous, Campanian)	Canada (Alberta*; Saskatchewan)	Hundreds of individuals have been preserved in a single "mega-bonebed"	
Ceoptera	Elizabeth Martin-Silverstone; David M. Unwin; Andrew R. Cuff; Emily E. Brown; Lu Allington-Jones; Paul M. Barrett	2023	Kilmaluag Formation (Middle Jurassic, Bathonian)	Scotland (Highland)	Represents a rare non-Asian darwinopteran from the Middle Jurassic, showing how pterosaurs evolved in this critical period	
Ceramornis	Pierce Brodkorb	1963	Lance Formation (Late Cretaceous, Maastrichtian)	United States (Wyoming)	Either a crown-group bird or a close relative	
Cerasinops	Brenda J. Chinnery; John R. Horner	2007	Two Medicine Formation (Late Cretaceous, Campanian)	United States (Montana)	Combines features of both Asian and North American basal ceratopsians	
Ceratonykus	Vladimir R. Alifanov; Rinchen Barsbold	2009	Baruungoyot Formation (Late Cretaceous, Maastrichtian)	Mongolia (Ömnögovi)	Several osteological features were described as being similar to ornithischians	
Ceratops	Othniel C. Marsh	1888	Judith River Formation (Late Cretaceous, Campanian)	United States (Montana)	Although only known from a few bones, this genus is the namesake of the Ceratopsia and the Ceratopsidae	
Ceratosaurus	Othniel C. Marsh	1884	Morrison Formation (Late Jurassic, Kimmeridgian to Tithonian)	United States (Colorado*; Utah; Wyoming)	Possessed a row of osteoderms running down its back	
Ceratosuchops	Chris T. Barker; David W. E. Hone; Darren Naish; Andrea Cau; Jeremy A. F. Lockwood; Brian Foster; Claire E. Clarkin; Philipp Schneider; Neil J. Gostling	2021	Wessex Formation (Early Cretaceous, Barremian)	England (Isle of Wight)	Differs from Baryonyx in subtle details of its skull	
Cerebavis	Evgeny N. Kurochkin; S. V. Saveliev; A. A. Postnov; Evgeny M. Pervushov; Evgeny V. Popov	2006	Melovatka Formation (Late Cretaceous, Cenomanian)	Russia (Volgograd Oblast)	Originally thought to be a preserved brain, but actually a badly preserved skull	
Cetiosauriscus	Friedrich von Huene	1927	Oxford Clay (Middle Jurassic, Callovian)	England (Cambridgeshire)	Has been assigned to a variety of positions around Eusauropoda	
Cetiosaurus	Richard Owen	1841	Forest Marble Formation (Middle Jurassic, Bathonian)	England (Oxfordshire)	Once believed to be a large seagoing animal	
Chakisaurus	Rodrigo Alvarez Nogueira; Sebastián Rozadilla; Federico L. Agnolín; Jordi A. García Marsà; Matías J. Motta; Fernando E. Novas	2024	Huincul Formation (Late Cretaceous, Cenomanian to Turonian)	Argentina (Río Negro)	Known from various partial skeletons belonging to individuals of different ages	
Changchengopterus	Junchang Lü	2009	Tiaojishan Formation (Late Jurassic, Oxfordian)	China (Hebei)	Combines features of primitive monofenestratans and later pterodactyloids	
Changchengornis	Qiang Ji; Luis M. Chiappe; Shu-An Ji	1999	Yixian Formation (Early Cretaceous, Barremian)	China (Liaoning)	Had a more pointed bill than the related Confuciusornis	
Changchunsaurus	Shuqin Zan; Jun Chen; Liyong Jin; Tao Li	2005	Quantou Formation (Early Cretaceous to Late Cretaceous, Aptian to Cenomanian)	China (Jilin)	Had wavy enamel on its leaf-shaped teeth that made them more resistant to wear, similar to Agilisaurus and hadrosaurs	
Changmaornis	Yaming Wang; Jingmai K. O'Connor; Daqing Li; Hailu You	2013	Xiagou Formation (Early Cretaceous, Aptian)	China (Gansu)	Represents one of the many ornithuromorphs from the Changma basin	
Changmiania	Yuqing Yang; Wenhao Wu; Paul-Emile Dieudonné; Pascal Godefroit	2020	Yixian Formation (Early Cretaceous, Barremian)	China (Liaoning)	Preserved in a curled up position as if it was sleeping in a potential burrow	
Changyuraptor	Gang Han; Luis M. Chiappe; Shu-An Ji; Michael B. Habib; Alan H. Turner; Anusuya Chinsamy; Xueling Liu; Lizhuo Han	2014	Yixian Formation (Early Cretaceous, Barremian)	China (Liaoning)	The largest microraptorian dromaeosaurid known, with tail feathers almost a foot long	
Changzuiornis	Jiandong Huang; Xia Wang; Yuanchao Hu; Jia Liu; Jennifer A. Peteya; Julia A. Clarke	2016	Jiufotang Formation (Early Cretaceous, Aptian)	China (Liaoning)	Had an unusually long beak with small teeth	
Chaoyangia	Lianhai Hou; Jiangyong Zhang	1993	Jiufotang Formation (Early Cretaceous, Aptian)	China (Liaoning)	One of the first birds named from the Jehol Biota	
Chaoyangopterus	Xiaolin Wang; Zhonghe Zhou	2003	Jiufotang Formation (Early Cretaceous, Aptian)	China (Liaoning)	Has been considered a nyctosaurid, pteranodontid, and tapejarid but is now assigned to its own family	
Chaoyangsaurus	Xijin Zhao; Zhengwu Cheng; Xing Xu	1999	Tuchengzi Formation (Late Jurassic, Tithonian)	China (Liaoning)	Known by a number of alternate spellings (e.g. Chaoyangosaurus, Chaoyoungosaurus) before its formal description	
Charonosaurus	Pascal Godefroit; Shuqin Zan; Liyong Jin	2000	Yuliangze Formation (Late Cretaceous, Maastrichtian)	China (Heilongjiang)	May have had a long, backwards-curving crest similar to that of Parasaurolophus	
Chasmosaurus	Lawrence M. Lambe	1914	Dinosaur Park Formation (Late Cretaceous, Campanian)	Canada (Alberta)	Known from multiple remains, including various skulls	
Chebsaurus	Farida Mahammed; Émilie Läng; Leïla Mami; Larbi Mekahli; Miloud Benhamou; Boumediène Bouterfa; Ali Kacemi; Sid-Ali Chérief; Hayate Chaouati; Philippe Taquet	2005	Aïssa Formation (Middle Jurassic, Callovian)	Algeria (Naâma)	Known from two juvenile specimens	
Chenanisaurus	Nicholas R. Longrich; Xabier Pereda-Suberbiola; Nour-Eddine Jalil; Fatima Khaldoune; Essaid Jourani	2017	Couche III (Late Cretaceous, Maastrichtian)	Morocco (Béni Mellal-Khénifra)	Potentially represents a lineage of abelisaurids endemic to Africa	
Chialingosaurus	Zhongjian Yang	1959	Shangshaximiao Formation (Late Jurassic, Oxfordian to Tithonian)	China (Sichuan)	Had both large spines and smaller plates, similar to Kentrosaurus	
Chiappeavis	Jingmai K. O'Connor; Xiaoli Wang; Xiaoting Zheng; Han Hu; Xiaomei Zhang; Zhonghe Zhou	2016	Jiufotang Formation (Early Cretaceous, Aptian)	China (Liaoning)	Possessed a fan-shaped tail composed of many feathers	
Chiayusaurus	Birger Bohlin	1953	Xinminbao Group (Early Cretaceous, Barremian to Aptian)	China (Gansu)	Known only from teeth described as indistinguishable from those of Euhelopus or Mamenchisaurus	
Chienkosaurus	Zhongjian Yang	1942	Kuangyuan Series (Late Jurassic, Oxfordian to Tithonian)	China (Sichuan)	A possible junior synonym of Szechuanosaurus	
Chilantaisaurus	Shouyong Hu	1964	Ulansuhai Formation (Late Cretaceous, Turonian)	China (Inner Mongolia)	Had a particularly hooked claw on its first finger	
Chilesaurus	Fernando E. Novas; Leonardo J. Salgado; Manuel Suárez; Federico L. Agnolín; Martín D. Ezcurra; Nicolás R. Chimento; Rita de la Cruz; Marcelo P. Isasi; Alexander O. Vargas; David Rubilar-Rogers	2015	Toqui Formation (Late Jurassic, Tithonian)	Chile (Aysén)	Combines traits of theropods, sauropodomorphs, and ornithischians, with far-reaching implications for the evolution of the Dinosauria	
Chindesaurus	Robert A. Long; Phillip A. Murry	1995	Chinle Formation (Late Triassic, Norian)	United States (Arizona)	Possibly a close relative of Tawa	
Chingkankousaurus	Zhongjian Yang	1958	Wangshi Group (Late Cretaceous, Campanian)	China (Shandong)	A possible tyrannosauroid only known from a scapula	
Chinshakiangosaurus	Zhiming Dong	1992	Fengjiahe Formation (Early Jurassic, Pliensbachian)	China (Yunnan)	Had a U-shaped snout that may have supported fleshy cheeks, an adaptation to bulk feeding	
Chirostenotes	Charles W. Gilmore	1924	Dinosaur Park Formation (Late Cretaceous, Campanian)	Canada (Alberta)	Originally known only from isolated body parts	
Choconsaurus	María Edith Simón; Leonardo Salgado; Jorge O. Calvo	2018	Huincul Formation (Late Cretaceous, Cenomanian)	Argentina (Neuquén)	One of the most completely known basal titanosaurs	
Chondrosteosaurus	Richard Owen	1876	Wessex Formation (Early Cretaceous, Berriasian to Barremian)	England (Isle of Wight)	The air sacs in its vertebrae were originally believed to be filled with cartilage	
Chongmingia.	Min Wang; Xiaoli Wang; Yan Wang; Zhonghe Zhou	2016	Jiufotang Formation (Early Cretaceous, Aptian)	China (Liaoning)	One of the more primitive non-ornithothoracean birds	
Choyrodon	Terry A. Gates; Khishigjav Tsogtbaatar; Lindsay E. Zanno; Tsogtbaatar Chinzorig; Mahito Watabe	2018	Khuren Dukh Formation (Early Cretaceous, Aptian to Albian)	Mongolia (Dornogovi)	It had an enlarged nose similar to its contemporary Altirhinus, but it is currently considered a separate taxon	
Chromogisaurus	Martín D. Ezcurra	2010	Ischigualasto Formation (Late Triassic, Carnian to Norian)	Argentina (San Juan)	Its discovery suggests that early dinosaurs were more diverse than previously thought	
Chuandongocoelurus	Xinlu He	1984	Xiashaximiao Formation (Middle Jurassic to Late Jurassic, Bathonian to Oxfordian)	China (Sichuan)	A tetanuran of uncertain relationships	
Chuanjiesaurus	Xiaoxi Fang; Qiqing Long; Liwu Lu; Zixiong Zhang; Shigang Pan; Yumin Wang; Xikang Li; Zhengwu Cheng	2000	Chuanjie Formation (Middle Jurassic, Aalenian to Bajocian)	China (Yunnan)	One of the most derived mamenchisaurids	
Chuanqilong	Fenglu Han; Wenjie Zheng; Dongyu Hu; Xing Xu; Paul M. Barrett	2014	Jiufotang Formation (Early Cretaceous, Aptian)	China (Liaoning)	May have been the adult form of the coeval Liaoningosaurus	
Chubutisaurus	Guillermo del Corro	1975	Cerro Barcino Formation (Early Cretaceous to Late Cretaceous, Aptian to Cenomanian)	Argentina (Chubut)	Its forelimbs were shorter than its hindlimbs	
Chucarosaurus	Federico L. Agnolín; Bernardo J. Gonzalez Riga; Alexis Mauro Aranciaga Rolando; Sebastián Rozadilla; Matías J. Motta; Nicolás R. Chimento; Fernando E. Novas	2023	Huincul Formation (Late Cretaceous, Cenomanian to Turonian)	Argentina (Río Negro)	Slightly smaller and more slender than the contemporary Argentinosaurus	
Chungkingosaurus	Zhiming Dong; Shiwu Zhou; Yihong Zhang	1983	Shangshaximiao Formation (Late Jurassic, Oxfordian to Tithonian)	China (Sichuan)	May have possessed at least six thagomizer spikes, with the rearmost pair mounted horizontally, directed outwards and backwards	
Chupkaornis	Tomonori Tanaka; Yoshitsugu Kobayashi; Ken'ichi Kurihara; Anthony R. Fiorillo; Manabu Kano	2018	Kashima Formation (Late Cretaceous, Coniacian to Santonian)	Japan (Hokkaido)	The easternmost and oldest known Asian hesperornithiform	
Chuxiongosaurus	Junchang Lü; Yoshitsugu Kobayashi; Tianguang Li; Shimin Zhong	2010	Lufeng Formation (Early Jurassic, Hettangian to Pliensbachian)	China (Yunnan)	Potentially a synonym of Jingshanosaurus	
Cimoliopterus	Taissa Rodrigues; Alexander W. A. Kellner	2013	Britton Formation (Late Cretaceous, Cenomanian to Turonian); Cambridge Greensand (Early Cretaceous, Albian); Chalk Group (Late Cretaceous, Cenomanian)*	England (Cambridgeshire; Kent*); United States (Texas)	One of the few pterosaur genera known from two continents	
Cimoliornis	Richard Owen	1846	Chalk Group (Late Cretaceous, Cenomanian to Turonian)	England (Cambridgeshire)	Considered the largest known pterosaur until later discoveries of specimens assigned to Ornithocheirus	
Cimolopteryx	Othniel C. Marsh	1892	Frenchman Formation (Late Cretaceous, Maastrichtian; Lance Formation (Late Cretaceous, Maastrichtian)*	Canada (Saskatchewan); United States (Wyoming*)	Has been considered an early charadriiform	
Cionodon	Edward D. Cope	1874	Denver Formation (Late Cretaceous, Maastrichtian)*; Judith River Formation (Late Cretaceous, Campanian)	Canada (Alberta); United States (Colorado*)	A poorly known hadrosaurid	
Citipati	James M. Clark; Mark A. Norell; Rinchen Barsbold	2001	Djadokhta Formation (Late Cretaceous, Campanian)	Mongolia (Ömnögovi)	Had a distinctive triangular crest	
Citipes	Gregory F. Funston	2021	Dinosaur Park Formation (Late Cretaceous, Campanian)	Canada (Alberta)	Some specimens were found as stomach contents of Gorgosaurus	
Claorhynchus	Edward D. Cope	1892	Laramie Formation (Late Cretaceous, Maastrichtian)	United States (Colorado)	May be either a hadrosaurid or a ceratopsid, in which case it may be a synonym of Triceratops	
Claosaurus	Othniel C. Marsh	1890	Niobrara Formation (Late Cretaceous, Coniacian to Campanian)	United States (Kansas)	Historically conflated with other hadrosaurs	
Clasmodosaurus	Florentino Ameghino	1898	Cerro Fortaleza Formation (Late Cretaceous, Campanian to Maastrichtian); Mata Amarilla Formation (Late Cretaceous, Cenomanian)*	Argentina (Santa Cruz)	Similarly to Bonitasaura, its teeth were polygonal in cross-section	
Coahuilaceratops	Mark A. Loewen; Scott D. Sampson; Eric K. Lund; Andrew A. Farke; Martha C. Aguillón Martínez; Claudio A. de Leon; Rubén A. Rodríguez-de la Rosa; Michael A. Getty; David A. Eberth	2010	Cerro Huerta Formation (Late Cretaceous, Maastrichtian)	Mexico (Coahuila)	Possessed brow horns comparable in size to those of Triceratops and Torosaurus	
Coahuilasaurus	Nicholas R. Longrich; Angel A. Ramírez-Velasco; James I. Kirkland; Andrés E. Bermúdez Torres; Claudia I. Serrano-Brañas	2024	Cerro del Pueblo Formation (Late Cretaceous, Campanian)	Mexico (Coahuila)	Identified as a specimen of Kritosaurus before receiving its own genus name	
Coelophysis	Edward D. Cope	1889	Chinle Formation (Late Triassic, Norian)*; Rock Point Formation (Late Triassic, Carnian to Rhaetian)	United States (Arizona*; New Mexico)	Known from over a thousand specimens, making it one of the most well-known early dinosaurs	
Coelosaurus	Joseph Leidy	1865	Navesink Formation (Late Cretaceous, Maastrichtian)	United States (New Jersey)	The generic name is said to be preoccupied, but its namesake remains obscure	
Coeluroides	Friedrich von Huene; Charles A. Matley	1933	Lameta Formation (Late Cretaceous, Maastrichtian)	India (Madhya Pradesh)	Potentially synonymous with Ornithomimoides	
Coelurus	Othniel C. Marsh	1879	Morrison Formation (Late Jurassic, Kimmeridgian to Tithonian)	United States (Wyoming)	Has been assigned to a variety of positions around the Coelurosauria	
Colepiocephale	Robert M. Sullivan	2003	Foremost Formation (Late Cretaceous, Campanian)	Canada (Alberta)	Originally described as a species of Stegoceras	
Coloborhynchus	Richard Owen	1874	Hastings Beds (Early Cretaceous, Valanginian)	England (East Sussex)	Once believed to be the largest toothed pterosaur	
Coloradisaurus	Peter M. Galton	1990	Los Colorados Formation (Late Triassic, Norian)	Argentina (La Rioja)	Originally called Coloradia, although that genus name is preoccupied by a moth	
Comahuesaurus	José L. Carballido; Leonardo Salgado; Diego Pol; José I. Canudo; Alberto C. Garrido	2012	Lohan Cura Formation (Early Cretaceous, Aptian to Albian)	Argentina (Neuquén)	Its holotype was originally assigned to Limaysaurus, but it was named as a separate genus due to several morphological differences	
Comodactylus	Peter M. Galton	1981	Morrison Formation (Late Jurassic, Kimmeridgian to Tithonian)	United States (Wyoming)	Reportedly exceptionally large for a non-pterodactyloid pterosaur	
Compsognathus	Johann A. Wagner	1859	Altmühltal Formation (Late Jurassic, Tithonian)*; Calcaires blances de Provence (Late Jurassic, Tithonian)	France (Provence-Alpes-Côte d'Azur); Germany (Bavaria*)	One of the smallest known non-avian dinosaurs	
Compsosuchus	Friedrich von Huene; Charles A. Matley	1933	Lameta Formation (Late Cretaceous, Maastrichtian)	India (Madhya Pradesh)	Has been suggested to be an abelisaurid and a noasaurid	
Comptonatus	Jeremy A. F. Lockwood; David M. Martill; Susannah C.R. Maidment	2024	Wessex Formation (Early Cretaceous, Barremian)	England (Isle of Wight)	One of the most completely known ornithopod taxa from the Isle of Wight	
Concavenator	Francisco Ortega; Fernando Escaso; José L. Sanz	2010	La Huérguina Formation (Early Cretaceous, Barremian)	Spain (Castilla-La Mancha)	Preserves bumps on its ulna which have been interpreted as quill knobs, although they might have been muscle attachments instead	
Conchoraptor	Rinchen Barsbold	1986	Nemegt Formation (Late Cretaceous, Maastrichtian)	Mongolia (Ömnögovi)	Named for a hypothesized diet of shellfish, but this cannot be confirmed	
Concornis	José L. Sanz; Angela D. Buscalioni	1992	La Huérguina Formation (Early Cretaceous, Barremian)	Spain (Castilla-La Mancha)	One of the most complete Las Hoyas enantiornitheans	
Condorraptor	Oliver W. M. Rauhut	2005	Cañadón Asfalto Formation (Early Jurassic, Toarcian)	Argentina (Chubut)	Closely related to the coeval Piatnitzkysaurus but could be distinguished by several osteological features	
Confuciusornis	Lianhai Hou; Zhonghe Zhou; Y.C. Gu; He Zhang	1995	Jiufotang Formation (Early Cretaceous, Aptian); Yixian Formation (Early Cretaceous, Barremian)*	China (Liaoning)	One of the most common Mesozoic dinosaurs, with over a thousand fossils known	
Convolosaurus	Kate A. Andrzejewski; Dale A. Winkler; Louis L. Jacobs	2019	Twin Mountains Formation (Early Cretaceous, Aptian)	United States (Texas)	Before its formal description, it had been informally referred to as the "Proctor Lake hypsilophodontid"	
Coronosaurus	Michael J. Ryan; David C. Evans; Kieran M. Shepherd	2012	Oldman Formation (Late Cretaceous, Campanian)	Canada (Alberta)	Had irregular masses of small spikes on the very top of its frill	
Corythoraptor	Junchang Lü; Guoqing Li; Martin Kundrát; Yuong-Nam Lee; Zhenyuan Sun; Yoshitsugu Kobayashi; Caizhi Shen; Fangfang Teng; Hanfeng Liu	2017	Nanxiong Formation (Late Cretaceous, Maastrichtian)	China (Jiangxi)	Its crest was vertical and rectangular, not unlike that of a cassowary	
Corythosaurus	Barnum Brown	1914	Dinosaur Park Formation (Late Cretaceous, Campanian)*; Oldman Formation (Late Cretaceous, Campanian)	Canada (Alberta)	Possessed a semicircular crest which may have been used for vocalization	
Craspedodon	Louis Dollo	1883	Lonzée Member (Late Cretaceous, Santonian)	Belgium (Wallonia)	May be the first neoceratopsian known from Europe	
Craterosaurus	Harry G. Seeley	1874	Woburn Sands Formation (Early Cretaceous, Aptian to Albian)	England (Bedfordshire)	Potentially synonymous with Regnosaurus	
Cratoavis	Ismar S. Carvalho; Fernando E. Novas; Federico L. Agnolín; Marcelo P. Isasi; Francisco I. Freitas; José A. Andrade	2015	Crato Formation (Early Cretaceous, Aptian)	Brazil (Ceará)	A very well-preserved South American enantiornithean, complete with ribbon-like tail feathers	
Cratonavis	Zhiheng Li; Min Wang; Thomas A. Stidham; Zhonghe Zhou	2023	Jiufotang Formation (Early Cretaceous, Aptian)	China (Liaoning)	Several features of its skull are similar to those of non-avialan dinosaurs	
Cratonopterus	Shunxing Jiang; Junyi Song; Xinjun Zhang; Xin Cheng; Xiaolin Wang	2023	Huajiying Formation (Early Cretaceous, Hauterivian)	China (Hebei)	The first pterosaur named from the Huajiying Formation	
Cretaaviculus	Bazhanov	1969	Bostobe Formation (Late Cretaceous, Santonian to Campanian)	Kazakhstan (Kyzylorda)	An obscure genus only known from a single isolated contour feather	
Cretornis	Antonín Frič	1881	Jizera Formation (Late Cretaceous, Turonian)	Czech Republic (Pardubice)	Once believed to be some kind of toothed bird	
Crichtonpelta	Victoria M. Arbour; Philip J. Currie	2016	Sunjiawan Formation (Late Cretaceous, Cenomanian)	China (Liaoning)	Originally named as a second species of Crichtonsaurus	
Crichtonsaurus	Zhiming Dong	2002	Sunjiawan Formation (Late Cretaceous, Cenomanian)	China (Liaoning)	Sometimes reconstructed with semicircular osteoderms vaguely similar to the plates of stegosaurs	
Cristatusaurus	Philippe Taquet; Dale A. Russell	1998	Elrhaz Formation (Early Cretaceous, Barremian to Albian)	Niger (Agadez)	Usually seen as a synonym of Suchomimus, although some studies consider it to be a valid genus	
Crittendenceratops	Sebastian G. Dalman; John-Paul M. Hodnett; Asher J. Lichtig; Spencer G. Lucas	2018	Fort Crittenden Formation (Late Cretaceous, Campanian)	United States (Arizona)	The youngest known member of the Nasutoceratopsini	
Cruralispennia	Min Wang; Jingmai K. O'Connor; Yanhong Pan; Zhonghe Zhou	2017	Huajiying Formation (Early Cretaceous, Hauterivian)	China (Hebei)	Had an unusual ornithuromorph-like pygostyle and brush-like thigh feathers	
Cruxicheiros	Roger B.J. Benson; Jonathan D. Radley	2010	Chipping Norton Limestone (Middle Jurassic, Bathonian)	England (Warwickshire)	Inconsistent in phylogenetic placement	
Cryodrakon	David W. E. Hone; Michael B. Habib; François Therrien	2019	Dinosaur Park Formation (Late Cretaceous, Campanian)	Canada (Alberta)	Known from specimens of various ages, including very large individuals	
Cryolophosaurus	William R. Hammer; William J. Hickerson	1994	Hanson Formation (Early Jurassic, Pliensbachian)	Antarctica (Ross Dependency)	Had a distinctive "pompadour" crest that spanned the head from side to side	
Cryptosaurus	Harry G. Seeley	1869	Ampthill Clay (Late Jurassic, Oxfordian)	England (Cambridgeshire)	Only known from a single femur	
Ctenochasma	Hermann von Meyer	1851	Calcaires tachetés (Late Jurassic, Tithonian); Mörnsheim Formation (Late Jurassic, Tithonian); Painten Formation (Late Jurassic, Tithonian); Purbeck Group (Late Jurassic, Tithonian)*	France (Grand Est); Germany (Bavaria; Lower Saxony*)	Had a series of fine, bristle-like teeth that formed a filter-like structure for feeding	
Cumnoria	Harry G. Seeley	1888	Kimmeridge Clay (Late Jurassic, Kimmeridgian)	England (Oxfordshire)	May be a species of Camptosaurus or something a little more basal	
Cuspicephalus	David M. Martill; Steve Etches	2013	Kimmeridge Clay (Late Jurassic, Kimmeridgian)	England (Dorset)	The specific name scarfi honors Gerald Scarfe, a cartoonist known for his point-nosed caricatures	
Cuspirostrisornis	Lianhai Hou	1997	Jiufotang Formation (Early Cretaceous, Aptian)	China (Liaoning)	Originally mistakenly believed to have possessed a pointed beak	
Cycnorhamphus	Harry G. Seeley	1870	Altmühltal Formation (Late Jurassic, Tithonian); Calcaires blances de Provence (Late Jurassic, Tithonian); Nusplingen Limestone (Late Jurassic, Kimmeridgian)*; Painten Formation (Late Jurassic, Tithonian)	France (Provence-Alpes-Côte d'Azur); Germany (Baden-Württemberg*; Bavaria)	One specimen shows that adults had jaws that curved away from each other at the tips, with soft tissue filling in the resulting gap, similar to openbill storks	
Daanosaurus	Yong Ye; Yu-Hui Gao; Shan Jiang	2005	Shangshaximiao Formation (Late Jurassic, Oxfordian to Tithonian)	China (Sichuan)	Its phylogenetic position is uncertain as it is only known from the remains of a juvenile	
Dacentrurus	Frederick A. Lucas	1902	Alcobaça Formation (Late Jurassic, Oxfordian to Kimmeridgian); Argiles d'Octeville (Late Jurassic, Kimmeridgian); Kimmeridge Clay (Late Jurassic, Kimmeridgian)*; Lourinhã Formation (Late Jurassic, Kimmeridgian); Villar del Arzobispo Formation (Late Jurassic to Early Cretaceous, Tithonian to Berriasian)	England (Dorset; Wiltshire*); France (Normandy); Portugal (Leiria; Lisbon); Spain (Aragon; Valencia)	Known from abundant remains, suggesting that it lived in a broad range	
Daemonosaurus	Hans-Dieter Sues; Sterling J. Nesbitt; David S. Berman; Amy C. Henrici	2011	Chinle Formation (Late Triassic, Norian to Rhaetian)	United States (New Mexico)	Unique among early dinosaurs for possessing a short snout with long teeth	
Dahalokely	Andrew A. Farke; Joseph J. W. Sertich	2013	Ambolafotsy Formation (Late Cretaceous, Turonian)	Madagascar (Sava)	Shares features with both abelisaurids and noasaurids	
Dakotadon	Gregory S. Paul	2008	Lakota Formation (Early Cretaceous, Berriasian to Barremian)	United States (South Dakota)	Originally named as a species of Iguanodon	
Dakotaraptor	Robert A. DePalma; David A. Burnham; Larry D. Martin; Peter L. Larson; Robert T. Bakker	2015	Hell Creek Formation (Late Cretaceous, Maastrichtian)	United States (South Dakota)	The holotype assemblage may represent a chimera of multiple taxa	
Dalianraptor	C. Gao; J. Liu	2005	Jiufotang Formation (Early Cretaceous, Aptian)	China (Liaoning)	Most likely a tampered, chimeric fossil including a Jeholornis skeleton and the arms of a flightless theropod	
Daliansaurus	Caizhi Shen; Junchang Lü; Sizhao Liu; Martin Kundrát; Stephen L. Brusatte; Hailong Gao	2017	Yixian Formation (Early Cretaceous, Barremian)	China (Liaoning)	Had an enlarged claw on the fourth toe comparable in size to the sickle claw on its second toe	
Dalingheornis	Zihui Zhang; Lianhai Hou; Yoshikasu Hasegawa; Jingmai K. O'Connor; Larry D. Martin; Luis M. Chiappe	2006	Yixian Formation (Early Cretaceous, Barremian)	China (Liaoning)	Was well-adapted for climbing due to its heterodactyl feet, like those of a trogon	
Dandakosaurus	P. M. Yadagiri	1982	Kota Formation (Early Jurassic to Middle Jurassic, Pliensbachian to Callovian)	India (Telangana)	Poorly known but large for an early theropod	
Daohugoupterus	Xin Cheng; Xiaolin Wang; Shunxing Jiang; Alexander W. A. Kellner	2015	Tiaojishan Formation (Late Jurassic, Oxfordian)	China (Liaoning)	The smallest pterosaur from the Tiaojishan Formation	
Dapingfangornis	Li Li; Ye Duan; Dongyu Hu; Li Wang; Shaoli Cheng; Lianhai Hou	2006	Jiufotang Formation (Early Cretaceous, Aptian)	China (Liaoning)	May have had a thornlike structure on its forehead	
Darwinopterus	Junchang Lü; David M. Unwin; Xingsheng Jin; Yongqing Liu; Qiang Ji	2010	Tiaojishan Formation (Late Jurassic, Oxfordian)	China (Liaoning)	One of the earliest transitional pterosaurs identified	
Dashanpusaurus	Guangzhao Peng; Yong Ye; Yu-Hui Gao; Chunkang Shu; Shan Jiang	2005	Xiashaximiao Formation (Middle Jurassic to Late Jurassic, Bathonian to Oxfordian)	China (Sichuan)	Possibly one of the basalmost and earliest known macronarians	
Daspletosaurus	Dale A. Russell	1970	Dinosaur Park Formation (Late Cretaceous, Campanian); Judith River Formation (Late Cretaceous, Campanian); Oldman Formation (Late Cretaceous, Campanian)*; Two Medicine Formation (Late Cretaceous, Campanian)	Canada (Alberta*); United States (Montana)	Its three named species have been interpreted as forming an anagenetic lineage, but this hypothesis has been criticized	
Datai	Lida Xing; Kecheng Niu; Jordan Mallon; Tetsuto Miyashita	2023	Zhoutian Formation (Late Cretaceous, Turonian to Coniacian)	China (Jiangxi)	Known from two associated specimens, including their skulls	
Datanglong	Jinyou Mo; Fusheng Zhou; Guangning Li; Zhen Huang; Chenyun Cao	2014	Xinlong Formation (Early Cretaceous, Aptian to Albian)	China (Guangxi)	Had a uniquely pneumatized ilium similar to megaraptorans	
Datonglong	Shichao Xu; Hailu You; Jiawei Wang; Suozhu Wang; Jian Yi; Lei Jia	2016	Huiquanpu Formation (Late Cretaceous, Campanian to Maastrichtian)	China (Shanxi)	May have had twenty-nine teeth in its lower jaw	
Datousaurus	Zhiming Dong; Zilu Tang	1984	Xiashaximiao Formation (Middle Jurassic to Late Jurassic, Bathonian to Oxfordian)	China (Sichuan)	One of the rarest Shaximiao sauropods, known from only two skeletons and a large, deep skull	
Daurlong	Xuri Wang; Andrea Cau; Bin Guo; Feimin Ma; Gele Qing; Yichuan Liu	2022	Longjiang Formation (Early Cretaceous, Barremian to Aptian)	China (Inner Mongolia)	Preserves remains of an intestinal tract	
Dawndraco	Alexander W. A. Kellner	2010	Niobrara Formation (Late Cretaceous, Coniacian to Campanian)	United States (Kansas)	Possibly a specimen of Pteranodon, the genus to which it was originally assigned	
Daxiatitan	Hailu You; Daqing Li; Lingqi Zhou; Qiang Ji	2008	Hekou Group (Early Cretaceous, Valanginian to Albian)	China (Gansu)	Large and relatively long-necked	
Dearc	Natalia Jagielska; Michael O'Sullivan; Gregory F. Funston; Ian B. Butler; Thomas J. Challands; Neil D.L. Clark; Nicholas C. Fraser; Amelia Penny; Dugald A. Ross; Mark Wilkinson; Stephen L. Brusatte	2022	Lealt Shale (Middle Jurassic, Bathonian)	Scotland (Highland)	May have been one of the largest non-pterodactyloid pterosaurs	
Deinocheirus	Halszka Osmólska; Ewa Roniewicz	1970	Nemegt Formation (Late Cretaceous, Maastrichtian)	Mongolia (Ömnögovi)	Had a suite of unique features, including a hump supported by elongated neural spines	
Deinodon	Joseph Leidy	1856	Judith River Formation (Late Cretaceous, Campanian)	United States (Montana)	Only known from teeth, several of which have since been found to belong to already known species, with the holotype possibly belonging to Gorgosaurus	
Deinonychus	John H. Ostrom	1969	Antlers Formation (Early Cretaceous, Aptian); Cloverly Formation (Early Cretaceous, Albian)*	United States (Montana*; Oklahoma; Wyoming)	Its discovery helped researchers realize that dinosaurs were active, warm-blooded animals, kicking off the Dinosaur Renaissance	
Deltadromeus	Paul C. Sereno; Didier B. Dutheil; Mohamed Iarochene; Hans C. E. Larsson; Gabrielle H. Lyon; Paul M. Magwene; Christian A. Sidor; David J. Varricchio; Jeffrey A. Wilson	1996	Aoufous Formation (Late Cretaceous, Cenomanian)	Morocco (Souss-Massa)	Its precise phylogenetic position has been historically unstable, with multiple interpretations being suggested in the scientific literature	
Demandasaurus	Fidel T. Fernández-Baldor; José I. Canudo; Pedro Huerta; Diego Montero; Xabier Pereda-Suberbiola; Leonardo Salgado	2011	Castrillo de la Reina Formation (Early Cretaceous, Barremian to Aptian)	Spain (Castile and León)	Most closely related to African rebbachisaurids, suggesting a faunal exchange	
Dendrorhynchoides	Shu-An Ji; Qiang Ji; Kevin Padian	1999	Yixian Formation (Early Cretaceous, Barremian)	China (Liaoning)	May have come from the Jurassic period, but this is due to confusion with a specimen later named Luopterus	
Denversaurus	Robert T. Bakker	1988	Hell Creek Formation (Late Cretaceous, Maastrichtian)*; Lance Formation (Late Cretaceous, Maastrichtian)	United States (South Dakota*; Wyoming)	One of the youngest known nodosaurids	
Dermodactylus	Othniel C. Marsh	1881	Morrison Formation (Late Jurassic, Kimmeridgian to Tithonian)	United States (Wyoming)	The oldest pterosaur described from the Morrison Formation	
Diabloceratops	James I. Kirkland; Donald D. DeBlieux	2010	Wahweap Formation (Late Cretaceous, Campanian)	United States (Utah)	Had a distinctively short, deep skull	
Diamantinasaurus	Scott A. Hocknull; Matt A. White; Travis R. Tischler; Alex G. Cook; Naomi D. Calleja; Trish Sloan; David A. Elliott	2009	Winton Formation (Late Cretaceous, Cenomanian to Turonian)	Australia (Queensland)	May have been closely related to South American titanosaurs, suggesting they dispersed to Australia via Antarctica	
Diclonius	Edward D. Cope	1876	Judith River Formation (Late Cretaceous, Campanian)	United States (Montana)	Replaced its teeth in such a way that new teeth could be used at the same time as older ones	
Dicraeosaurus	Werner Janensch	1914	Tendaguru Formation (Late Jurassic, Oxfordian to Tithonian)	Tanzania (Lindi)	A short-necked, low-browsing sauropod	
Dilong	Xing Xu; Mark A. Norell; Xuewen Kuang; Xiaolin Wang; Qi Zhao; Chengkai Jia	2004	Yixian Formation (Early Cretaceous, Barremian)	China (Liaoning)	Preserves evidence of a coating of simple feathers	
Dilophosaurus	Samuel P. Welles	1970	Kayenta Formation (Early Jurassic, Sinemurian to Toarcian)	United States (Arizona)	Possessed two semicircular crests running along the length of the skull	
Diluvicursor	Matthew C. Herne; Alan M. Tait; Vera Weisbecker; Michael Hall; Jay P. Nair; Michael Cleeland; Steven W. Salisbury	2018	Eumeralla Formation (Early Cretaceous, Aptian to Albian)	Australia (Victoria)	Lived in a prehistoric floodplain close to a high energy river	
Dimorphodon	Richard Owen	1859	Blue Lias (Early Jurassic, Hettangian to Sinemurian)	England (Dorset)	Unlike most early pterosaurs, it probably spent most of its life on the ground	
Dineobellator	Steven E. Jasinski; Robert M. Sullivan; Peter Dodson	2020	Ojo Alamo Formation (Late Cretaceous, Maastrichtian)	United States (New Mexico)	Several features of its hands and feet may be adaptations for increased grip strength	
Dingavis	Jingmai K. O'Connor; Min Wang; Han Hu	2016	Yixian Formation (Early Cretaceous, Barremian)	China (Liaoning)	Its elongated snout was constructed convergently similar to longipterygid enantiornitheans, despite being an ornithuromorph	
Dinheirosaurus	José F. Bonaparte; Octávio Mateus	1999	Lourinhã Formation (Late Jurassic, Kimmeridgian)	Portugal (Lisbon)	Possibly a second species of Supersaurus	
Dinodocus	Richard Owen	1884	Lower Greensand Group (Early Cretaceous, Aptian to Albian)	England (Kent)	The only known humerus is almost complete, missing only small portions	
Diodorus	Christian F. Kammerer; Sterling J. Nesbitt; Neil H. Shubin	2012	Timezgadiouine Formation (Late Triassic, Carnian to Norian)	Morocco (Marrakesh-Safi)	Its scientific name honors the ancient historian Diodorus Siculus and the mythographer Dionysius Scytobrachion	
Diopecephalus	Harry G. Seeley	1871	Altmühltal Formation (Late Jurassic, Tithonian)	Germany (Bavaria)	Once seen as a synonym of Pterodactylus but is now considered a distinct genus	
Diplodocus	Othniel C. Marsh	1878	Morrison Formation (Late Jurassic, Kimmeridgian to Tithonian)	United States (Colorado*; New Mexico; Utah; Wyoming)	Had a long, thin tail popularly thought to have been used like a bullwhip, but it is possible that it could not handle the stress of supersonic travel	
Diplotomodon	Joseph Leidy	1868	Navesink Formation (Late Cretaceous, Maastrichtian)	United States (New Jersey)	Has been suggested to be non-dinosaurian	
Diuqin	Juan D. Porfiri; Mattia A. Baiano; Domenica D. dos Santos; Federico A. Gianechini; Michael Pittman; Matthew C. Lamanna	2024	Bajo de la Carpa Formation (Late Cretaceous, Santonian)	Argentina (Neuquén)	Only known from a humerus and fragmentary vertebrae	
Dolichosuchus	Friedrich von Huene	1932	Löwenstein Formation (Late Triassic, Norian)	Germany (Bavaria)	Originally classified as a stem-crocodile	
Dolicorhamphus	Harry G. Seeley	1885	Fuller's Earth Formation (Middle Jurassic, Bathonian); Taynton Limestone Formation (Middle Jurassic, Bathonian)*	England (Oxfordshire)	Both species were originally assigned to the genus Rhamphocephalus, but that turned out to be a thalattosuchian, hence the reassignment	
Domeykodactylus	David M. Martill; Eberhard Frey; Guillermo C. Diaz; C. M. Bell	2000	Santa Ana Formation (Early Cretaceous, Berriasian to Albian)	Chile (Antofagasta)	The first dsungaripterid named from South America	
Dongbeititan	Xuri Wang; Hailu You; Qingjin Meng; Chunling Gao; Xiaodong Cheng; Jinyuan Liu	2007	Yixian Formation (Early Cretaceous, Barremian)	China (Liaoning)	A theropod tooth has been found encrusted in one of its ribs	
Dongusuchus	A. G. Sennikov	1988	Donguz Formation (Middle Triassic, Anisian)	Russia (Orenburg Oblast)	Originally believed to be a long-necked "rauisuchian"	
Dongyangopelta	Rongjun Chen; Wenjie Zheng; Yoichi Azuma; Masateru Shibata; Tianliang Lou; Qiang Jin; Xingsheng Jin	2013	Chaochuan Formation (Early Cretaceous to Late Cretaceous, Albian to Cenomanian)	China (Zhejiang)	Coexisted with Zhejiangosaurus but could be distinguished based on subtle osteological features	
Dongyangosaurus	Junchang Lü; Yoichi Azuma; Rongjun Chen; Wenjie Zheng; Xingsheng Jin	2008	Jinhua Formation (Late Cretaceous, Turonian to Coniacian)	China (Zhejiang)	Its phylogenetic placement is uncertain	
Doratorhynchus	Harry G. Seeley	1875	Purbeck Marble (Late Jurassic to Early Cretaceous, Tithonian to Berriasian)	England (Dorset)	Has been suggested to be the oldest known azhdarchid	
Dornraptor	Matthew G. Baron	2024	Blue Lias (Early Jurassic, Hettangian to Sinemurian)	England (Dorset)	Its remains were informally named "Merosaurus" before their formal description	
Dorygnathus	Johann A. Wagner	1860	Posidonia Shale (Early Jurassic, Toarcian)	Germany (Baden-Württemberg; Bavaria*)	Had different types of teeth that interlocked to create a trap for fish	
Douzhanopterus	Xiaoli Wang; Shunxing Jiang; Junqiang Zhang; Xin Cheng; Xuefeng Yu; Yameng Li; Guangjin Wei; Xiaolin Wang	2017	Tiaojishan Formation (Late Jurassic, Oxfordian)	China (Liaoning)	Similar to darwinopterans but with slightly more advanced features	
Draconyx	Octávio Mateus; Miguel T. Antunes	2001	Lourinhã Formation (Late Jurassic, Kimmeridgian)	Portugal (Lisbon)	May have been a member of an ornithopod clade that did not appear in North America, unlike other groups of Late Jurassic animals	
Dracopelta	Peter M. Galton	1980	Lourinhã Formation (Late Jurassic, Tithonian)	Portugal (Lisbon)	The structure of its limbs suggests it might have had a cursorial lifestyle	
Dracoraptor	David M. Martill; Steven U. Vidovic; Cindy Howells; John R. Nudds	2016	Blue Lias (Early Jurassic, Hettangian)	Wales (Vale of Glamorgan)	May have been a shore dweller due to its island habitat	
Dracovenator	Adam M. Yates	2005	Upper Elliot Formation (Early Jurassic, Sinemurian to Pliensbachian)	South Africa (Eastern Cape)	Only known from fragments of a skull, but those are enough to tell that it was related to Dilophosaurus	
Draigwenia	Borja Holgado	2021	Cambridge Greensand (Early Cretaceous, Albian)	England (Cambridgeshire)	Has been assigned to the genera Ornithocheirus, Amblydectes, and Lonchodectes	
Dravidosaurus	P. M. Yadagiri; K. Ayyasami	1979	Anaipadi Formation (Late Cretaceous, Coniacian)	India (Tamil Nadu)	Described as a stegosaur but has been suggested to be a plesiosaur	
Dreadnoughtus	Kenneth J. Lacovara; Matthew C. Lamanna; Lucio M. Ibiricu; Jason C. Poole; Elena R. Schroeter; Paul V. Ullmann; Kristyn K. Voegele; Zachary M. Boles; Aja M. Carter; Emma K. Fowler; Victoria M. Egerton; Alison E. Moyer; Christopher L. Coughenour; Jason P. Schein; Jerald D. Harris; Rubén D. F. Martínez; Fernando E. Novas	2014	Cerro Fortaleza Formation (Late Cretaceous, Campanian to Maastrichtian)	Argentina (Santa Cruz)	The heaviest land animal whose mass can be calculated with reasonable certainty	
Dromaeosauroides	Per Christiansen; Niels Bonde	2003	Jydegaard Formation (Early Cretaceous, Berriasian to Valanginian)	Denmark (Hovedstaden)	A referred coprolite has been found which contains fish remains, but it could instead belong to a turtle	
Dromaeosaurus	William D. Matthew; Barnum Brown	1922	Dinosaur Park Formation (Late Cretaceous, Campanian)	Canada (Alberta)	Analysis of wear on its teeth suggests it preferred tougher prey, including bone	
Dromiceiomimus	Dale A. Russell	1972	Horseshoe Canyon Formation (Late Cretaceous, Maastrichtian)	Canada (Alberta)	May be synonymous with Ornithomimus edmontonicus	
Dromomeron	Randall B. Irmis; Sterling J. Nesbitt; Kevin Padian; Nathan D. Smith; Alan H. Turner; Daniel Woody; Alex Downs	2007	Chinle Formation (Late Triassic, Norian)*; Colorado City Formation (Late Triassic, Norian); Quebrada del Barro Formation (Late Triassic, Norian)	Argentina (San Juan); United States (Arizona; Colorado; New Mexico*)	Three species are known, the most of any lagerpetid	
Drusilasaura	César Navarrete; Gabriel Casal; Rubén D. F. Martínez	2011	Bajo Barreal Formation (Late Cretaceous, Cenomanian to Turonian)	Argentina (Santa Cruz)	Potentially the oldest known member of the lognkosaurian lineage	
Dryosaurus	Othniel C. Marsh	1894	Morrison Formation (Late Jurassic, Kimmeridgian to Tithonian)	United States (Colorado; Utah; Wyoming*)	Remains of multiple growth stages have been found, including specimens in embryonic age	
Dryptosauroides	Friedrich von Huene; Charles A. Matley	1933	Lameta Formation (Late Cretaceous, Maastrichtian)	India (Madhya Pradesh)	Only known from six caudal vertebrae	
Dryptosaurus	Othniel C. Marsh	1877	New Egypt Formation (Late Cretaceous, Maastrichtian)	United States (New Jersey)	Its discovery showed that theropods were bipedal animals	
Dsungaripterus	Zhongjian Yang	1964	Lianmuqin Formation (Early Cretaceous, Aptian to Albian)*; Shengjinkou Formation (Early Cretaceous, Valanginian)	China (Xinjiang)	Had upturned jaws and flat teeth, suggesting a durophagous diet	
Dubreuillosaurus	Ronan Allain	2005	Calcaire de Caen (Middle Jurassic, Bathonian)	France (Normandy)	Would have lived in a coastal mangrove swamp	
Dunhuangia	Min Wang; Daqing Li; Jingmai K. O'Connor; Zhonghe Zhou; Hailu You	2015	Xiagou Formation (Early Cretaceous, Aptian)	China (Gansu)	An enantiornithean from the Changma basin, an area which is unusually dominated by ornithuromorphs	
Duriatitan	Paul M. Barrett; Roger B.J. Benson; Paul Upchurch	2010	Kimmeridge Clay (Late Jurassic, Kimmeridgian)	England (Dorset)	Originally named as a species of Cetiosaurus	
Duriavenator	Roger B.J. Benson	2008	Inferior Oolite (Middle Jurassic, Bajocian)	England (Dorset)	The basalmost known member of the Megalosaurinae, which aligns with its stratigraphic position	
Dynamoterror	Andrew T. McDonald; Douglas G. Wolfe; Alton C. Dooley Jr.	2018	Menefee Formation (Late Cretaceous, Campanian)	United States (New Mexico)	Part of the Teratophoneini, a clade of tyrannosaurids most commonly known from southwestern North America	
Dyoplosaurus	William A. Parks	1924	Dinosaur Park Formation (Late Cretaceous, Campanian)	Canada (Alberta)	The holotype specimen preserves skin impressions	
Dysalotosaurus	Hans Virchow	1919	Tendaguru Formation (Late Jurassic, Kimmeridgian)	Tanzania (Lindi)	Known from multiple remains that revealed much about its life history, diet, and even disease	
Dysganus	Edward D. Cope	1876	Judith River Formation (Late Cretaceous, Campanian)	United States (Montana)	Four species have been named, all from isolated teeth	
Dyslocosaurus	John S. McIntosh; Walter P. Coombs Jr.; Dale A. Russell	1992	Morrison Formation (Late Jurassic, Kimmeridgian to Tithonian)	United States (Wyoming)	Has been suggested to have four claws on its hindlimbs	
Dystrophaeus	Edward D. Cope	1877	Morrison Formation (Late Jurassic, Oxfordian)	United States (Utah)	Inconsistent in phylogenetic placement, although undescribed remains could further clarify its relationships	
Dzharaonyx	Alexander O. Averianov; Hans-Dieter Sues	2021	Bissekty Formation (Late Cretaceous, Turonian)	Uzbekistan (Navoiy)	One of the oldest known parvicursorines	
Dzharatitanis	Alexander O. Averianov; Hans-Dieter Sues	2021	Bissekty Formation (Late Cretaceous, Turonian)	Uzbekistan (Navoiy)	Originally described as a rebbachisaurid but later reinterpreted as a titanosaur with possible lognkosaurian affinities	
Echinodon	Richard Owen	1861	Purbeck Group (Early Cretaceous, Berriasian)	England (Dorset)	Originally misidentified as a herbivorous lizard	
Edmontonia	Charles M. Sternberg	1928	Dinosaur Park Formation (Late Cretaceous, Campanian); Horseshoe Canyon Formation (Late Cretaceous, Maastrichtian)*	Canada (Alberta)	Possessed forward-pointing, bifurcated spikes on its shoulders	
Edmontosaurus	Lawrence M. Lambe	1917	Frenchman Formation (Late Cretaceous, Maastrichtian); Hell Creek Formation (Late Cretaceous, Maastrichtian); Horseshoe Canyon Formation (Late Cretaceous, Campanian to Maastrichtian)*; Lance Formation (Late Cretaceous, Maastrichtian); Prince Creek Formation (Late Cretaceous, Campanian)	Canada (Alberta*; Saskatchewan); United States (Alaska; Montana; North Dakota; South Dakota; Wyoming)	Known from multiple well-preserved specimens, including a few "mummies", several of which were originally assigned to their own genera and/or species	
Efraasia	Peter M. Galton	1973	Löwenstein Formation (Late Triassic, Norian)	Germany (Baden-Württemberg)	Some remains assigned to this genus were originally classified in separate genera	
Einiosaurus	Scott D. Sampson	1995	Two Medicine Formation (Late Cretaceous, Campanian)	United States (Montana)	Distinguished by its forward-curving nasal horn	
Ekrixinatosaurus	Jorge O. Calvo; David Rubilar-Rogers; Karen Moreno	2004	Candeleros Formation (Late Cretaceous, Cenomanian)	Argentina (Neuquén)	Had robust bones, indicating a massive build and a greater resistance to injuries	
Elaltitan	Philip D. Mannion; Alejandro Otero	2012	Bajo Barreal Formation (Late Cretaceous, Cenomanian to Turonian)	Argentina (Chubut)	Extremely large as indicated by its long femur	
Elanodactylus	Brian Andres; Qiang Ji	2008	Yixian Formation (Early Cretaceous, Barremian)	China (Liaoning)	Had a long neck convergently similar to those of azhdarchids	
Elaphrosaurus	Werner Janensch	1920	Tendaguru Formation (Late Jurassic, Kimmeridgian)	Tanzania (Lindi)	Possessed a relatively shallow chest for a medium-sized theropod	
Elbretornis	Cyril A. Walker; Gareth J. Dyke	2009	Lecho Formation (Late Cretaceous, Maastrichtian)	Argentina (Salta)	May be synonymous with other enantiornitheans from its locality	
Elektorornis	Lida Xing; Jingmai K. O'Connor; Luis M. Chiappe; Ryan C. McKellar; Nathan Carroll; Han Hu; Ming Bai; Fumin Lei	2019	Burmese amber (Early Cretaceous to Late Cretaceous, Albian to Cenomanian)	Myanmar (Kachin)	Known from a foot preserved in amber with an elongated middle toe	
Elemgasem	Mattia A. Baiano; Diego Pol; Flavio Bellardini; Guillermo J. Windholz; Ignacio A. Cerda; Alberto C. Garrido; Rodolfo A. Coria	2022	Portezuelo Formation (Late Cretaceous, Turonian to Coniacian)	Argentina (Neuquén)	The first abelisaurid known from the Turonian-Coniacian interval	
Elmisaurus	Halszka Osmólska	1981	Nemegt Formation (Late Cretaceous, Maastrichtian)	Mongolia (Ömnögovi)	One of the most complete caenagnathids known	
Elopteryx	Charles W. Andrews	1913	Sânpetru Formation (Late Cretaceous, Maastrichtian)	Romania (Hunedoara)	Has been placed in different maniraptoran groups throughout history	
Elrhazosaurus	Peter M. Galton	2009	Elrhaz Formation (Early Cretaceous, Barremian to Albian)	Niger (Agadez)	Closely related to Valdosaurus	
Elsornis	Luis M. Chiappe; Shigeru Suzuki; Gareth J. Dyke; Mahito Watabe; Khishigjav Tsogtbaatar; Rinchen Barsbold	2007	Djadokhta Formation (Late Cretaceous, Campanian)	Mongolia (Ömnögovi)	Possibly flightless due to its wing proportions	
Emausaurus	Hartmut Haubold	1990	Posidonia Shale (Early Jurassic, Toarcian)	Germany (Mecklenburg-Vorpommern)	One of the oldest and basalmost thyreophorans	
Embasaurus	Anatoly N. Riabinin	1931	Neocomian Sands (Early Cretaceous, Berriasian to Hauterivian)	Kazakhstan (Atyrau)	Known from only two vertebrae	
Emiliasaura	Rodolfo A. Coria; Ignacio A. Cerda; Fernando Escaso; Mattia A. Baiano; Flavio Bellardini; A. Braun; L. M. Coria; J. M. Gutiérrez; D. Pino; Guillermo J. Windholz; Philip J. Currie; Francisco Ortega	2025	Mulichinco Formation (Early Cretaceous, Valanginian)	Argentina (Neuquén)	Although initially described as a rhabdodontomorph, a later study instead recovers it as a styracosternan	
Enaliornis	Harry G. Seeley	1876	Cambridge Greensand (Early Cretaceous, Albian)	England (Cambridgeshire)	Originally misidentified as a primitive loon	
Enantiophoenix	Andrea Cau; Paolo Arduini	2008	Sannine Formation (Late Cretaceous, Cenomanian)	Lebanon (Mount Lebanon)	Was once believed to have fed on tree sap as it was preserved in association with amber beads, however this was later determined as an artefact of preservation and not an indicator of diet	
Enantiornis	Cyril A. Walker	1981	Lecho Formation (Late Cretaceous, Maastrichtian)	Argentina (Salta)	Although only known from a few bones, this genus is the namesake of Enantiornithes	
Enigmosaurus	Rinchen Barsbold	1983	Bayanshiree Formation (Late Cretaceous, Cenomanian to Coniacian)	Mongolia (Dornogovi)	Had a large, backwards-pointing pelvis	
Eoabelisaurus	Diego Pol; Oliver W. M. Rauhut	2012	Cañadón Asfalto Formation (Early Jurassic, Toarcian)	Argentina (Chubut)	Shows a transitional arm morphology for an abelisauroid, with a shortened lower arm and hand, along with an unreduced humerus	
Eoalulavis	José L. Sanz; Luis M. Chiappe; Bernardino P. Pérez-Moreno; Angela D. Buscalioni; José J. Moratalla; Francisco Ortega; Francisco J. Poyato-Ariza	1996	La Huérguina Formation (Early Cretaceous, Barremian)	Spain (Castilla-La Mancha)	Preserves feathers including an alula, a specialized type of feather which controls air flow over the wing	
Eoazhdarcho	Junchang Lü; Jiang Qi	2005	Jiufotang Formation (Early Cretaceous, Aptian)	China (Liaoning)	Although originally described as an azhdarchid, it is more likely a closely related chaoyangopterid	
Eocarcharia	Paul C. Sereno; Stephen L. Brusatte	2008	Elrhaz Formation (Early Cretaceous, Barremian to Albian)	Niger (Agadez)	Originally thought to be a carcharodontosaurid but later research found it to be chimeric, with the holotype postorbital and referred skull roof likely belonging to a spinosaurid closely related to the contemporaneous Suchomimus, and the referred maxilla belonging to a distinct carcharodontosaurid	
Eocathayornis	Zhonghe Zhou	2002	Jiufotang Formation (Early Cretaceous, Aptian)	China (Liaoning)	Once considered to be a basal close relative of Cathayornis, although now considered to be more distantly related	
Eoconfuciusornis	Fucheng Zhang; Zhonghe Zhou; Michael J. Benton	2008	Dabeigou Formation (Early Cretaceous, Valanginian to Hauterivian)	China (Hebei)	Melanosome analysis suggests it had black and gray feathers with a brown throat	
Eocursor	Richard J. Butler; Roger M. H. Smith; David B. Norman	2007	Upper Elliot Formation (Early Jurassic, Sinemurian to Pliensbachian)	South Africa (Free State)	One of the most completely known early ornithischians	
Eodromaeus	Ricardo N. Martínez; Paul C. Sereno; Oscar A. Alcober; Carina E. Colombi; Paul R. Renne; Isabel P. Montañez; Brian S. Currie	2011	Ischigualasto Formation (Late Triassic, Carnian to Norian)	Argentina (San Juan)	Well-adapted for cursoriality despite its early age	
Eoenantiornis	Lianhai Hou; Larry D. Martin; Zhonghe Zhou; Alan Feduccia	1999	Yixian Formation (Early Cretaceous, Barremian)	China (Liaoning)	Well-preserved but inconsistent in phylogenetic placement	
Eogranivora	Xiaoting Zheng; Jingmai K. O'Connor; Xiaoli Wang; Yan Wang; Zhonghe Zhou	2018	Yixian Formation (Early Cretaceous, Barremian)	China (Liaoning)	A terrestrial, toothless bird that preserves direct evidence of seed-eating	
Eolambia	James I. Kirkland	1998	Cedar Mountain Formation (Early Cretaceous to Late Cretaceous, Albian to Cenomanian)	United States (Utah)	Remains of multiple individuals are known, making up much of the skeleton	
Eomamenchisaurus	Junchang Lü; Tianguang Li; Shimin Zhong; Qiang Ji; Shaoxue Li	2008	Zhanghe Formation (Middle Jurassic, Aalenian to Callovian)	China (Yunnan)	One of the oldest mamenchisaurids	
Eoneophron	Kyle L. Atkins-Weltman; D. Jade Simon; Holly N. Woodward; Gregory F. Funston; Eric Snively	2024	Hell Creek Formation (Late Cretaceous, Maastrichtian)	United States (South Dakota)	Smaller than the contemporary Anzu	
Eopengornis	Xiaoli Wang; Jingmai K. O'Connor; Xiaoting Zheng; Min Wang; Han Hu; Zhonghe Zhou	2014	Huajiying Formation (Early Cretaceous, Hauterivian)	China (Hebei)	One of the oldest confirmed genera of enantiornitheans known	
Eopteranodon	Junchang Lü; Xingliao Zhang	2005	Yixian Formation (Early Cretaceous, Barremian)	China (Liaoning)	Had a crest similar to that of Pteranodon, but was only distantly related	
Eoraptor	Paul C. Sereno; Catherine A. Forster; Raymond R. Rogers; Alfredo M. Monetta	1993	Ischigualasto Formation (Late Triassic, Carnian to Norian)	Argentina (San Juan)	Possessed different types of teeth, suggesting it was omnivorous	
Eosinopteryx	Pascal Godefroit; Helena Demuynck; Gareth J. Dyke; Dongyu Hu; François Escuillié; Philippe Claeys	2013	Tiaojishan Formation (Late Jurassic, Oxfordian)	China (Liaoning)	Described as lacking advanced tail feathers and long "hind wings", unlike other paravians, but this may be an artifact of preservation	
Eosipterus	Shu-An Ji; Qiang Ji	1997	Yixian Formation (Early Cretaceous, Barremian)	China (Liaoning)	May be an Asian relative of Pterodaustro	
Eotrachodon	Albert Prieto-Márquez; Gregory M. Erickson; Jun A. Ebersole	2016	Mooreville Chalk (Late Cretaceous, Santonian)	United States (Alabama)	Had a saurolophine-like skull despite its basal position	
Eotriceratops	Xiaochun Wu; Donald B. Brinkman; David A. Eberth; Dennis R. Braman	2007	Horseshoe Canyon Formation (Late Cretaceous, Maastrichtian)	Canada (Alberta)	May have been the largest known ceratopsid known from body fossils	
Eotyrannus	Stephen Hutt; Darren Naish; David M. Martill; Michael J. Barker; Penny Newbery	2001	Wessex Formation (Early Cretaceous, Barremian)	England (Isle of Wight)	Possessed grasping hands with three long fingers	
Eousdryosaurus	Fernando Escaso; Francisco Ortega; Pedro Dantas; Elisabete Maladaia; Bruno Silva; José M. Gasulla; Pedro Mocho; Iván Narváez; José L. Sanz	2014	Lourinhã Formation (Late Jurassic, Kimmeridgian)	Portugal (Lisbon)	Described as a dryosaurid but one study suggests a close relationship with elasmarians	
Epachthosaurus	Jaime E. Powell	1990	Bajo Barreal Formation (Late Cretaceous, Cenomanian to Turonian)	Argentina (Chubut)	Its caudal vertebrae were procoelous, meaning they were concave at the front and convex at the back	
Epanterias	Edward D. Cope	1878	Morrison Formation (Late Jurassic, Kimmeridgian to Tithonian)	United States (Colorado)	Possibly a large specimen of Allosaurus, but it may be a different taxon due to its younger age	
Epapatelo	Alexandra E. Fernandes; Octávio Mateus; Brian Andres; Michael J. Polcyn; Anne S. Schulp; António O. Gonçalves; Louis L. Jacobs	2022	Mocuio Formation (Late Cretaceous, Maastrichtian)	Angola (Namibe)	A rare pterosaur from sub-Saharan Africa	
Epichirostenotes	Robert M. Sullivan; Steven E. Jasinski; Mark P.A. Van Tomme	2011	Horseshoe Canyon Formation (Late Cretaceous, Campanian to Maastrichtian)	Canada (Alberta)	Its discovery allowed researchers to connect isolated caenagnathid body parts to each other	
Epidexipteryx	Fucheng Zhang; Zhonghe Zhou; Xing Xu; Xiaolin Wang; Corwin Sullivan	2008	Tiaojishan Formation (Late Jurassic, Oxfordian)	China (Inner Mongolia)	Supported four long feathers coming out from an abbreviated tail	
Equijubus	Hailu You; Zhexi Luo; Neil H. Shubin; Lawrence M. Witmer; Zhilu Tang; Feng Tang	2003	Xinminbao Group (Early Cretaceous, Barremian to Aptian)	China (Gansu)	A grazer that preserves the oldest known evidence of grass-eating	
Erectopus	Friedrich von Huene	1923	La Penthiève Beds (Early Cretaceous, Albian)	France (Grand Est)	One of the youngest known European carnosaurs	
Erketu	Daniel T. Ksepka; Mark A. Norell	2006	Bayanshiree Formation (Late Cretaceous, Cenomanian to Coniacian)	Mongolia (Dornogovi)	May have had the longest neck of any dinosaur relative to its body	
Erliansaurus	Xing Xu; Xiaohong Zhang; Paul C. Sereno; Xijin Zhao; Xuewen Kuang; Jun Han; Lin Tan	2002	Iren Dabasu Formation (Late Cretaceous, Turonian to Maastrichtian)	China (Inner Mongolia)	Had long, curved claws on its fingers	
Erlikosaurus	Rinchen Barsbold; Altangerel Perle	1980	Bayanshiree Formation (Late Cretaceous, Cenomanian to Coniacian)	Mongolia (Ömnögovi)	Preserves the most complete skull known from any therizinosaur	
Erythrovenator	Rodrigo T. Müller	2021	Candelária Formation (Late Triassic, Carnian)	Brazil (Rio Grande do Sul)	Known from the Riograndia Assemblage Zone, an area which is unusually dominated by cynodonts	
Eshanosaurus	Xing Xu; Xijin Zhao; James M. Clark	2001	Lufeng Formation (Early Jurassic, Hettangian)	China (Yunnan)	Has been suggested to be the oldest known therizinosaur	
Eucamerotus	John W. Hulke	1872	Wessex Formation (Early Cretaceous, Berriasian to Barremian)	England (Isle of Wight)	Preserves extensive evidence of pneumatization	
Eucercosaurus	Harry G. Seeley	1879	Cambridge Greensand (Early Cretaceous, Albian)	England (Cambridgeshire)	Sometimes considered an ankylosaur but one study assigns it to Iguanodontia	
Eucnemesaurus	Egbert C. N. van Hoepen	1920	Lower Elliot Formation (Late Triassic, Norian)	South Africa (Free State)	Some fossils assigned to this genus were originally interpreted as those of a giant herrerasaurid	
Eucoelophysis	Robert M. Sullivan; Spencer G. Lucas	1999	Chinle Formation (Late Triassic, Norian)	United States (New Mexico)	Originally believed to be a theropod, but now considered a relative of Silesaurus	
Eudimorphodon	Rocco Zambelli	1973	Calcare di Zorzino (Late Triassic, Norian)	Italy (Lombardy)	One of the first Triassic pterosaurs known	
Euhelopus	Alfred S. Romer	1956	Meng-Yin Formation (Early Cretaceous, Berriasian to Valanginian)	China (Shandong)	Originally believed to have lived in a marshy environment	
Euoplocephalus	Lawrence M. Lambe	1910	Dinosaur Park Formation (Late Cretaceous, Campanian)	Canada (Alberta)	Unusually, its palpebral bone was mobile, allowing it to be used as an eyelid	
Eurazhdarcho	Mátyás Vremir; Alexander W. A. Kellner; Darren Naish; Gareth J. Dyke	2013	Sebeș Formation (Late Cretaceous, Maastrichtian)	Romania (Alba)	Smaller than the contemporary Hatzegopteryx but was likely not a juvenile of the latter	
Eurolimnornis	Eugen Kessler; Tiberiu Jurcsák	1986	Bauxite of Cornet (Early Cretaceous, Berriasian)	Romania (Bihor)	Once believed to be a bird or non-avian theropod, but currently considered a pterosaur	
Euronychodon	Miguel T. Antunes; Denise Sigogneau-Russell	1991	Argiles et sables de Taveiro (Late Cretaceous, Campanian to Maastrichtian)*; Bissekty Formation (Late Cretaceous, Turonian)	Portugal (Coimbra*); Uzbekistan (Navoiy)	May represent a form taxon of improperly developed teeth	
Europasaurus	P. Martin Sander; Octávio Mateus; Thomas Laven; Nils Knötschke	2006	Süntel Formation (Late Jurassic, Kimmeridgian)	Germany (Lower Saxony)	Much smaller than other sauropods due to its isolated island habitat	
Europatitan	Fidel T. Fernández-Baldor; José I. Canudo; Pedro Huerta; Miguel Moreno-Azanza; Diego Montero	2017	Castrillo de la Reina Formation (Early Cretaceous, Barremian to Aptian)	Spain (Castile and León)	The specific name, eastwoodi, honors film director Clint Eastwood	
Europejara	Romain Vullo; Jesús Marugán-Lobón; Alexander W. A. Kellner; Angela D. Buscalioni; Bernard Gomez; Montserrat de la Fuente; José J. Moratalla	2012	La Huérguina Formation (Early Cretaceous, Barremian)	Spain (Castilla-La Mancha)	The first tapejarid discovered in Europe	
Europelta	James I. Kirkland; Luis Alcalá; Mark A. Loewen; Eduardo Espílez; Luis Mampel; Jelle P. Wiersma	2013	Escucha Formation (Early Cretaceous, Aptian to Albian)	Spain (Aragon)	Almost the entire skeleton is known	
Euskelosaurus	Thomas H. Huxley	1867	Lower Elliot Formation (Late Triassic, Norian)	South Africa (Eastern Cape)	Originally thought to have been bow-legged	
Eustreptospondylus	Alick D. Walker	1964	Oxford Clay (Middle Jurassic, Callovian)	England (Oxfordshire)	May have swum between islands similar to a Komodo dragon	
Evgenavis	Jingmai K. O'Connor; Alexander O. Averianov; Nikita V. Zelenkov	2014	Ilek Formation (Early Cretaceous, Barremian to Aptian)	Russia (Kemerovo Oblast)	Known only from a tarsometatarsus which shares some features with enantiornitheans, though this position is not certain	
Explorornis	Andrey V. Panteleyev	1998	Bissekty Formation (Late Cretaceous, Turonian)	Uzbekistan (Navoiy)	One of many fragmentary Bissekty enantiornitheans	
Fabrosaurus	Leonard Ginsburg	1964	Upper Elliot Formation (Early Jurassic, Sinemurian to Pliensbachian)	Lesotho (Mafeteng)	May potentially be a synonym of Lesothosaurus	
Falcarius	James I. Kirkland; Lindsay E. Zanno; Scott D. Sampson; James M. Clark; Donald D. DeBlieux	2005	Cedar Mountain Formation (Early Cretaceous, Berriasian to Valanginian)	United States (Utah)	Transitional between generalized theropods and specialized therizinosaurs	
Falcatakely	Patrick M. O'Connor; Alan H. Turner; Joseph R. Groenke; Ryan N. Felice; Raymond R. Rogers; David W. Krause; Lydia J. Rahantarisoa	2020	Maevarano Formation (Late Cretaceous, Maastrichtian)	Madagascar (Boeny)	Developed a massive snout with only a single tooth, despite retaining a "primitive" skull arrangement in contrast to modern birds	
Faxinalipterus	José F. Bonaparte; Cesar L. Schultz; Marina B. Soares	2010	Caturrita Formation (Late Triassic, Norian)	Brazil (Rio Grande do Sul)	A snout bone referred to this genus actually belongs to a pseudosuchian	
Feilongus	Xiaolin Wang; Alexander W. A. Kellner; Zhonghe Zhou; Diogenes A. Campos	2005	Jiufotang Formation (Early Cretaceous, Aptian); Yixian Formation (Early Cretaceous, Barremian)*	China (Liaoning)	Had a long low crest on its snout and a tapering one on the back of its head	
Feitianius	Jingmai K. O'Connor; Daqing Li; Matthew C. Lamanna; Min Wang; Jerald D. Harris; Jessie Atterholt; Hailu You	2016	Xiagou Formation (Early Cretaceous, Aptian)	China (Gansu)	Possessed an elaborate set of tail feathers, unlike the paired ribbon-like feathers of most enantiornitheans	
Fenghuangopterus	Junchang Lü; Xiaohui Fucha; Jinmei Chen	2010	Tiaojishan Formation (Late Jurassic, Oxfordian)	China (Liaoning)	Had vertically arranged teeth, unlike most rhamphorhynchids	
Ferganasaurus	Vladimir R. Alifanov; Alexander O. Averianov	2003	Balabansai Formation (Middle Jurassic, Bathonian to Callovian)	Kyrgyzstan (Jalal-Abad)	Claimed to have two hand claws, but this has been disputed	
Ferganocephale	Alexander O. Averianov; Thomas Martin; Aizek A. Bakirov	2005	Balabansai Formation (Middle Jurassic, Bathonian to Callovian)	Kyrgyzstan (Jalal-Abad)	Unusually for ornithischians, its teeth were not serrated	
Ferrisaurus	Victoria M. Arbour; David C. Evans	2019	Tango Creek Formation (Late Cretaceous, Maastrichtian)	Canada (British Columbia)	Its holotype was discovered close to a railway line	
Ferrodraco	Adele H. Pentland; Stephen F. Poropat; Travis R. Tischler; Trish Sloan; Robert A. Elliott; Harry A. Elliott; Judy A. Elliott; David A. Elliott	2019	Winton Formation (Late Cretaceous, Cenomanian to Turonian)	Australia (Queensland)	Its fossil was found in ironstone	
Flexomornis	Ronald S. Tykoski; Anthony R. Fiorillo	2010	Lewisville Formation (Late Cretaceous, Cenomanian)	United States (Texas)	One of the oldest North American avialans found	
Fona	Haviv M. Avrahami; Peter J. Makovicky; Ryan T. Tucker; Lindsay E. Zanno	2024	Cedar Mountain Formation (Early Cretaceous to Late Cretaceous, Albian to Cenomanian)	United States (Utah)	Possibly a semi-fossorial animal based on the related Oryctodromeus	
Foraminacephale	Ryan K. Schott; David C. Evans	2017	Dinosaur Park Formation (Late Cretaceous, Campanian)*; Oldman Formation (Late Cretaceous, Campanian)	Canada (Alberta)	Originally assigned to three different pachycephalosaurid genera	
Forfexopterus	Shunxing Jiang; Xin Cheng; Yingxia Ma; Xiaolin Wang	2016	Jiufotang Formation (Early Cretaceous, Aptian)	China (Liaoning)	Had a straighter snout and more curved teeth than other ctenochasmatids	
Fortipesavis	Alexander D. Clark; Jingmai K. O'Connor	2021	Burmese amber (Early Cretaceous to Late Cretaceous, Albian to Cenomanian)	Myanmar (Kachin)	Had an enlarged outer toe that may have been an adaptation for perching	
Fortunguavis	Min Wang; Jingmai K. O'Connor; Zhonghe Zhou	2014	Jiufotang Formation (Early Cretaceous, Aptian)	China (Liaoning)	Had robust bones, including feet and claws which may have been adapted for climbing trees	
Fosterovenator	Sebastian G. Dalman	2014	Morrison Formation (Late Jurassic, Kimmeridgian to Tithonian)	United States (Wyoming)	Has been variously described as a ceratosaurid, a tetanuran, or a close relative of Elaphrosaurus	
Fostoria	Phil R. Bell; Tom Brougham; Matthew C. Herne; Timothy Frauenfelder; Elizabeth T. Smith	2019	Griman Creek Formation (Early Cretaceous to Late Cretaceous, Albian to Cenomanian)	Australia (New South Wales)	Four individuals have been found in association	
Fruitadens	Richard J. Butler; Peter M. Galton; Laura B. Porro; Luis M. Chiappe; Donald M. Henderson; Gregory M. Erickson	2010	Morrison Formation (Late Jurassic, Tithonian)	United States (Colorado)	One of the smallest known ornithischians	
Fujianvenator	Liming Xu; Min Wang; Runsheng Chen; Liping Dong; Min Lin; Xing Xu; Jianrong Tang; Hai-Lu You; Guowu Zhou; Linchang Wang; Wenxing He; Yujuan Li; Chi Zhang; Zhonghe Zhou	2023	Nanyuan Formation (Late Jurassic, Tithonian)	China (Fujian)	Possessed proportionally long legs which may be an adaptation to wading	
Fukuipteryx	Takuya Imai; Yoichi Azuma; Soichiro Kawabe; Masateru Shibata; Kazunori Miyata; Min Wang; Zhonghe Zhou	2019	Kitadani Formation (Early Cretaceous, Aptian)	Japan (Fukui)	A three-dimensionally preserved bird with a pygostyle	
Fukuiraptor	Yoichi Azuma; Philip J. Currie	2000	Kitadani Formation (Early Cretaceous, Aptian)	Japan (Fukui)	Similarly to Megaraptor, it was originally reconstructed as a dromaeosaur with its hand claw on its foot	
Fukuisaurus	Yoshitsugu Kobayashi; Yoichi Azuma	2003	Kitadani Formation (Early Cretaceous, Aptian)	Japan (Fukui)	The elements of its skull are so strongly fused that it was unable to chew	
Fukuititan	Yoichi Azuma; Masateru Shibata	2010	Kitadani Formation (Early Cretaceous, Aptian)	Japan (Fukui)	The first sauropod named from Japan	
Fukuivenator	Yoichi Azuma; Xing Xu; Mastaeru Shibata; Soichiro Kawabe; Kazunori Miyata; Takuya Imai	2016	Kitadani Formation (Early Cretaceous, Aptian)	Japan (Fukui)	May have been a herbivore or omnivore due to its heterodont dentition	
Fulengia	Robert L. Carroll; Peter M. Galton	1977	Lufeng Formation (Early Jurassic, Sinemurian)	China (Yunnan)	May have been a juvenile Lufengosaurus	
Fulgurotherium	Friedrich von Huene	1932	Griman Creek Formation (Early Cretaceous to Late Cretaceous, Albian to Cenomanian)	Australia (New South Wales)	Fragmentary, but may have been an elasmarian	
Fumicollis	Alyssa K. Bell; Luis M. Chiappe	2015	Niobrara Formation (Late Cretaceous, Coniacian to Campanian)	United States (Kansas)	Named after the Smoky Hill Chalk member where it was found	
Furcatoceratops	Hiroki Ishikawa; Takanobu Tsuihiji; Makoto Manabe	2023	Judith River Formation (Late Cretaceous, Campanian)	United States (Montana)	Preserves most of the postcranial skeleton, a rarity for ceratopsids	
Fushanosaurus	Xuri Wang; Wenhao Wu; Tao Li; Qiang Ji; Yinxian Li; Jinfang Guo	2019	Shishugou Formation (Middle Jurassic to Late Jurassic, Callovian to Oxfordian)	China (Xinjiang)	Known from a single femur of immense size	
Fusuisaurus	Jinyou Mo; Wei Wang; Zhitao Huang; Xin Huang; Xing Xu	2006	Xinlong Formation (Early Cretaceous, Aptian to Albian)	China (Guangxi)	A referred humerus may support an extremely large size for this taxon	
Futalognkosaurus	Jorge O. Calvo; Juan D. Porfiri; Bernardo J. González Riga; Alexander W. Armin Kellner	2007	Portezuelo Formation (Late Cretaceous, Turonian to Coniacian)	Argentina (Neuquén)	Possessed meter-deep cervical vertebrae with distinctive shark fin-shaped neural spines	
Fylax	Albert Prieto-Márquez; Miguel Á. Carrera Farias	2021	Figuerola Formation (Late Cretaceous, Maastrichtian)	Spain (Catalonia)	Lived very late despite its comparatively basal position	

== See also ==
- List of Mesozoic bird-line archosaur genera (A–B)
- List of Mesozoic bird-line archosaur genera (G–K)
- List of Mesozoic bird-line archosaur genera (L–O)
- List of Mesozoic bird-line archosaur genera (P–S)
- List of Mesozoic bird-line archosaur genera (T–Z)
