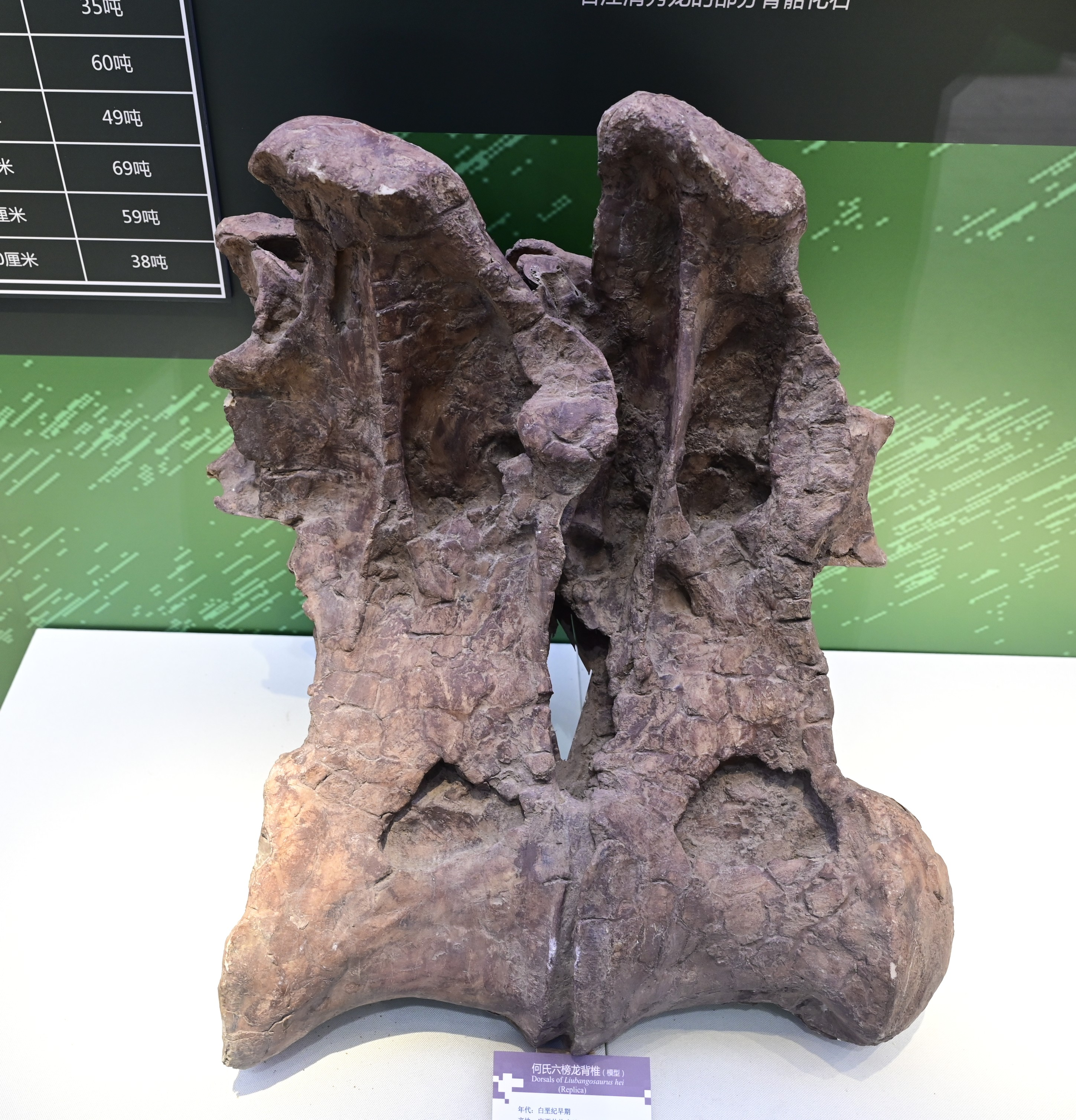
- Replica of holotype vertebrae, National Natural History Museum of China

Scientific classification
- Kingdom: Animalia
- Phylum: Chordata
- Clade: Dinosauria
- Clade: Saurischia
- Clade: †Sauropodomorpha
- Clade: †Sauropoda
- Clade: †Macronaria
- Clade: †Somphospondyli
- Genus: †Liubangosaurus; Mo, Xu, & Buffetaut, 2010

Type species
- Liubangosaurus hei Mo, Xu, & Buffetaut, 2010

= Liubangosaurus =

Liubangosaurus Temporal range: 125–113 Ma Early Cretaceous

Extinct genus of dinosaurs

Liubangosaurus (meaning "Liubang lizard", after Liubang village, the holotype locality) is a genus of sauropod dinosaur that lived during the Early Cretaceous in what is now China. Liubangosaurus is known from the holotype NHMG 8152, five complete and articulated middle-caudal dorsal vertebrae that were collected from the Xinlong Formation in Fusui County, Guangxi Province. The type species is L. hei, which honors He Wenjian, who discovered the site where Liubangosaurus was discovered.

== Discovery and naming ==
Sauropod remains were first discovered at the Liubang Quarry in 2001, near the village of the same name (Liubang) which is near the city of Nanning in the Guangxi Province of southern China. This locality corresponds to the Napai Formation, which is Early Cretaceous in age. Subsequent excavations determined that remains from a minimum of three individual specimens were present in the quarry. The largest of these would eventually be described as the new genus Fusuisaurus. The two smaller specimens were mostly disarticulated, which made it difficult for researchers to distinguish which bones belonged to which individuals. The remains were excavated with the help of the Natural History Museum of Guangxi, which is where the specimens were eventually stored. However, five caudal vertebrae among these remains were articulated, which was deemed sufficient to name and describe the new genus and species Liubangosaurus hei. It was fully described and named in 2010 by Mo Jinyou, Xu Xing, and Eric Buffetaut.

== Description ==
The holotype of Liubangosaurus was given the specimen number NHMG 8152. It consists of five articulated dorsal vertebrae, believed to represent the fifth through ninth dorsal vertebrae. The largest of these vertebrae (the fifth dorsal) has a total height of 710 mm (28 in). The fragmentary nature of the specimen makes the full size of Liubangosaurus difficult to estimate. Rubén Molina-Pérez and Asier Larramendi estimated its full size as being 26 m (85 ft) long, 5.4 m (18 ft) tall at the shoulder, and 26 tons

Despite consisting of only five vertebrae, the holotype of Liubangosaurus preserves several autapomorphies. These include features of the parapophyses, diapophyses, neural spines, and vertebral laminae. In particular, the vertebrae have a very distinctive "Y-shape" when viewed along their transverse plane.

== Classification ==
In their description of Liubangosaurus, Mo and colleagues conducted a phylogenetic analysis of neosauropods in order to determine the affinities of the new species. The trees they recovered were not very resolved and recovered Liubangosaurus in a polytomy with other groups of neosauropods. They suggested that it may be a close relative of the Late Jurassic genus Haplocanthosaurus, however they also caution that this assignment is very tentative due to the fragmentary nature of the holotype. Philip Mannion and colleagues published a comprehensive analysis of titanosauriform relationships in 2013. They used two different analytical methods to test these relationships, and both methods recovered different relationships for Liubangosaurus. The fragmentary nature of Liubangosaurus has served to complicate determinations of its phylogenetic affinities. Several recent analyses omit it entirely from their consensus trees. Condensed versions of the cladograms recovered by Mo and colleagues and also by Mannion and colleagues are shown below.

Mo, Xu, & Buffetaut, 2010

- Neosauropoda
  - Jobaria
  - - Haplocanthosaurus
    - Liubangosaurus
  - Diplodocoidea
  - Macronaria

Mannion et al. 2013, strict consensus

- Titanosauria
  - Diamantinasaurus
  - Xianshanosaurus
  - Lithostrotia
    - Malawisaurus
    - Saltasauridae
      - - Saltasaurus
        - - Alamosaurus
          - Jiangshanosaurus
      - - Liubangosaurus
        - - Dongyangosaurus
          - Opisthocoelicaudia

Mannion et al. 2013, strict reduced consensus

- Somphospondyli
  - Dongbeititan
  - - Euhelopodidae
      - - - Gobititan
          - - Phuwiangosaurus
            - Tangvayosaurus
        - - Qiaowanlong
          - - Erketu
            - Euhelopus
      - Liubangosaurus
    - - Brontomerus
      - - - - Sonorasaurus
            - Tastavinsaurus
          - - Diamantinasaurus
            - Haestasaurus
        - - Sauroposeidon
          - - - Ruyangosaurus
              - Wintonotitan
            - - Huanghetitan liujiaxiaensis
              - - "Huanghetitan" ruyangensis
                - Titanosauria

== Paleoenvironment ==
The Xinlong Formation is an Aptian-aged geological formation that consists mainly of various types of siltstones, fine sandstones, some mudstones and sandy conglomerates. The depositional environment consisted of various types of wetlands, which is reflected in the fossils that have been discovered in the area. Bivalve, charophyte, ostracod, and gastropod fossils are common alongside remains from hybodontiformes, bowfins, gars, turtles, and some crocodyliformes. Dinosaurs known from the area include the sauropods Asiatosaurus and Fusuisaurus, remains from spinosaurids, and some indeterminate ornithopods.

== See also ==
- 2010 in archosaur paleontology
- List of Asian dinosaurs
- List of sauropod species
- List of sauropodomorph type specimens
