= Largirostrornis =

Largirostrornis Temporal range: Early Cretaceous, 120 Ma
- Fossil specimen of L. sexdentoris, Shanghai Natural History Museum

Scientific classification
- Kingdom: Animalia
- Phylum: Chordata
- Class: Reptilia
- Clade: Dinosauria
- Clade: Saurischia
- Clade: Theropoda
- Clade: Avialae
- Clade: †Enantiornithes
- Genus: †Largirostrornis; Hou, 1997
- Species: †L. sexdentoris

Binomial name
- †Largirostrornis sexdentoris Hou, 1997

Extinct genus of birds

Largirostrornis is a genus of enantiornithean bird. One species has been named, Largirostornis sexdentoris. It lived during the Early Cretaceous and is known from fossils found in the Jiufotang Formation in Liaoning province, People's Republic of China. Some researchers believe this species to be a junior synonym of the similar Cathayornis yandica.

Largirostrornis is known from one fossil, slab and counterslab, found in the Jiufotang Formation in Liaoning province, People's Republic of China. The Jiufotang Formation is dated to the Early Cretaceous period, late Aptian age, 120.3 ±0.7 million years ago.

The holotype fossil is in the collection of the Institute of Vertebrate Paleontology and Paleoanthropology in Beijing, China. It has been given catalog number IVPP 10531.

L. sexdentornis had in 1997 a torso longer than all other known Enantiornithes. It is slightly larger than Cuspirostrisornis, with a skull about 32 millimeters long. The paired dentaries and premaxillae each hold six teeth. There are tall neural spines on the cervical and dorsal vertebrae.

== Etymology ==
The species was named and described by Hou Lianhai in 1997. The genus name comes from the Latin words largus, "large" and rostrum, "beak", and the specific name means "six-toothed" from Latin sex and dens.
