= Prodeinodon =

Prodeinodon Temporal range: Early Cretaceous, Barremian–Aptian

Scientific classification
- Kingdom: Animalia
- Phylum: Chordata
- Class: Reptilia
- Clade: Dinosauria
- Clade: Saurischia
- Clade: Theropoda
- Genus: †Prodeinodon; Osborn, 1924

Type species
- †Prodeinodon mongoliense Osborn, 1924

Species
- †P. kwangshiensis (?) Hou et al., 1975; †P. mongoliensis Osborn, 1924

Synonyms
- Prodeinodon mongoliense Osborn, 1924

Extinct genus of dinosaurs

Prodeinodon (meaning "before Deinodon") is a wastebasket taxon and a dubious genus of theropod dinosaur from the Early Cretaceous (Barremian to Aptian stages) from the Xinlong Formation in the Napai Basin of China and from the Oosh Formation of Mongolia. Two species have been formally identified (with a third informal species), all three known only from tooth fragments, showing no diagnostic features, making them difficult to classify, though they may belong to a carnosaur. At least some of the referred species may represent basal carcharodontosaurid theropods similar to Acrocanthosaurus.

The type species, P. mongoliensis, was described by Henry Fairfield Osborn in 1924. A second species, P. kwangshiensis, was named in 1975. "P. tibetensis" has not been formally described, and it may have belonged to its own, separate genus.

== Species ==
- P. mongoliensis (Osborn, 1924) is known from a single tooth, collected around 1923 and described by Henry Fairfield Osborn in a 1924 paper, where he also described several other theropods and sauropods discovered in Mongolia. The holotype of P. mongoliensis, which is the holotype for the entire genus, is AMNH 6265, a single tooth collected from the Oosh Formation. Some scientists have considered P. mongoliensis to have been a carnosaur.
- P. kwangshiensis (Hou et al., 1975) is known from four incomplete teeth and a tibia, found in the Xinlong Formation, China. It can confidently be identified to Theropoda but it was probably not the same type of theropod as P. mongoliense. It could represent a carcharodontosaurid closely related to Acrocanthosaurus.
- "P. tibetensis" is an informal species of Prodeinodon that was briefly mentioned in 1986. Known from a single vertebra found in the Hettangian Daye Group in China, this species was probably a theropod but it most likely did not belong to the same animal as P. mongoliensis and it may have belonged to its own, entirely separate genus. It is geographically present in Xizang Zizhiqu, China.
