= Longchengornis =

Longchengornis Temporal range: Early Cretaceous, 120 Ma

Scientific classification
- Kingdom: Animalia
- Phylum: Chordata
- Class: Reptilia
- Clade: Dinosauria
- Clade: Saurischia
- Clade: Theropoda
- Clade: Avialae
- Clade: †Enantiornithes
- Genus: †Longchengornis; Hou, 1997
- Species: †L. sanyanensis

Binomial name
- †Longchengornis sanyanensis Hou, 1997

Extinct genus of birds

Longchengornis is a genus of enantiornithean birds which lived during the early Cretaceous Period, about 120 mya, and is known from a fossil found in the Jiufotang Formation in Liaoning province, People's Republic of China. It contains the single species L. sanyanensis, though some researchers believe this to be a synonym of the similar species Cathayornis yandica.

== Discovery and etymology ==
The type species Longchengornis sanyanensis was named and described in 1997 by Hou Lianhai. The generic name Longchengornis combines the older name of Chaoyang, Longcheng or "Dragon City", with a Greek ornis, "bird". The specific name refers to the Sanyan, the "Three Yan" as the discovery was made on the former territory of the three Yan kingdoms: the Former Yan, the Later Yan and the Northern Yan.

== Description ==
Longchengornis sanyanensis is known from a single, partially articulated fossil skeleton and partial skull. Holotype IVPP V10530 indicates an animal with a length of 11 cm (4.3 in), hip height of 7.5 cm (3.0 in), and weight of 20 g (0.71 oz). Longchengornis is characterized by a wide humerus (upper arm bone) expanded at the shoulder joint, where there was a unique circular depression in the deltopectoral crest. The species had long, slender legs with large, hooked claws. The upper arm was slightly shorter than the lower arm, and the hand retained at least two claws.
