= Houornis =

Houornis Temporal range: Early Cretaceous, 120 Ma

Scientific classification
- Kingdom: Animalia
- Phylum: Chordata
- Class: Reptilia
- Clade: Dinosauria
- Clade: Saurischia
- Clade: Theropoda
- Clade: Avialae
- Clade: †Enantiornithes
- Genus: †Houornis; Wang & Liu 2015
- Species: †H. caudatus

Binomial name
- †Houornis caudatus (Hou, 1997) Wang & Liu 2015

Synonyms
- Genus synonymy: "Similicathayornis" Wang & Liu 2015; Species synonymy: Cathayornis caudatus Hou 1997; "Similicaudipteryx caudatus" (Hou 1997) Wang & Liu 2015

Genus of birds

Houornis is a genus of enantiornithean birds from the Jiufotang Formation of Liaoning, People's Republic of China. It is known from a single species, Houornis caudatus, which had been once been classified as a species of Cathayornis, and has also been regarded as a nomen dubium.

== Description ==
Houornis caudatus was a small enantiornithean with a slightly elongated, toothy snout and perching feet. It is known only from a single specimen, the slab and counter-slab of a fossil catalogued as number IVPP V10917/2 in the collections of the Institute of Vertebrate Paleontology and Paleoanthropology in Beijing. The specimen was found in 1993 by Zhou Zhonghe near the town of Boluochi in Liaoning Province, China. The actual bones of this specimen were not preserved, but rather can be seen by the impressions they left in the surrounding rock. It was originally thought to have a relatively long, bony tail intermediate in length between modern birds and long-tailed birds like Archaeopteryx, and so was in 1997 by Hou Lianhu given the name Cathayornis caudatus, meaning "tailed Cathay bird". This interpretation was later found to be in error, though it does appear to have an unusually long pygostyle (a component of the tail made of fused vertebrae).

While some researchers have considered the species dubious due to the poor preservation quality and incomplete nature of the fossil, a 2015 study by Wang Min and Liu Di was complete enough to be compared to similar species, including Cathayornis, and so they assigned it to its own genus, Houornis, the generic name honouring Hou. Wang and Liu found that Houornis can be told apart from similar species by several anatomical details, including the large pygostyle that gave it its name. Specimen IVPP V10533, the rear of a skeleton, had in 1997 been referred to the species by Hou and this was confirmed in 2015. Two additional but very fragmentary specimens, IVPP V9936 and V10896, have been referred to C. yandica in the past, but cannot be directly compared with the type specimen because they do not preserve any of the same key parts of the skeleton.

== Classification ==
Cathayornis caudatus was so named for its supposedly long bony tail lacking a pygostyle, and was further differentiated by its small size (the humerus, or upper arm bone, is less than 30 millimetres (1.2 in) long). In a 2010 paper, O'Connor and Dyke re-examined the specimen and showed that it is in fact only slightly smaller than the type specimen of C. yandica, and that a normal enantiornithean tail with a pygostyle is clearly visible in one of the fossil slabs, parts of the hip bones having been mistaken for unfused tail vertebrae. O'Connor and Dyke therefore considered C. caudatus a nomen dubium. However, in a 2015 re-evaluation of supposed "cathayornithids", Wang and Liu determined that C. caudatus could be differentiated from Cathayornis, but could not determine its relationships with other members of Enantiornithes using a phylogenetic analysis. They placed Houornis as incertae sedis.
