= Daye Group =

Geological formation in China

- Type: Geological formation

The Daye Group is a geological formation in China. It dates back to the Hettangian-Pliensbachian and it preserves dinosaur fossils, although none can be referred to the genus level.

== Vertebrate fauna ==
Dinosaurs of the Daye Group
Taxa	Presence	Notes	Images
Genus: Lufengosaurus; 1. L. changduensis	1. Geographically present in Xizang Zizhiqu, China.		Lufengosaurus Lufengosaurus
Genus: Prosauropoda; 1. Unnamed prosauropod.	1. Geographically present in Xizang Zizhiqu, China.		Lufengosaurus Lufengosaurus
Genus: Sauropoda; 1. Unnamed sauropod.	1. Geographically present in Xizang Zizhiqu, China.		Lufengosaurus Lufengosaurus
Genus: Theropoda; 1. Unnamed theropod	1. Geographically present in Xizang Zizhiqu, China.	1. Informally known as "Prodeinodon tibetensis".; 2. Known from a single vertebra.	Lufengosaurus Lufengosaurus
Genus: Thyreophora; 1. Possible unnamed thyreophoran.	1. Geographically present in Xizang Zizhiqu, China.		Lufengosaurus Lufengosaurus

== See also ==
- List of dinosaur-bearing rock formations
