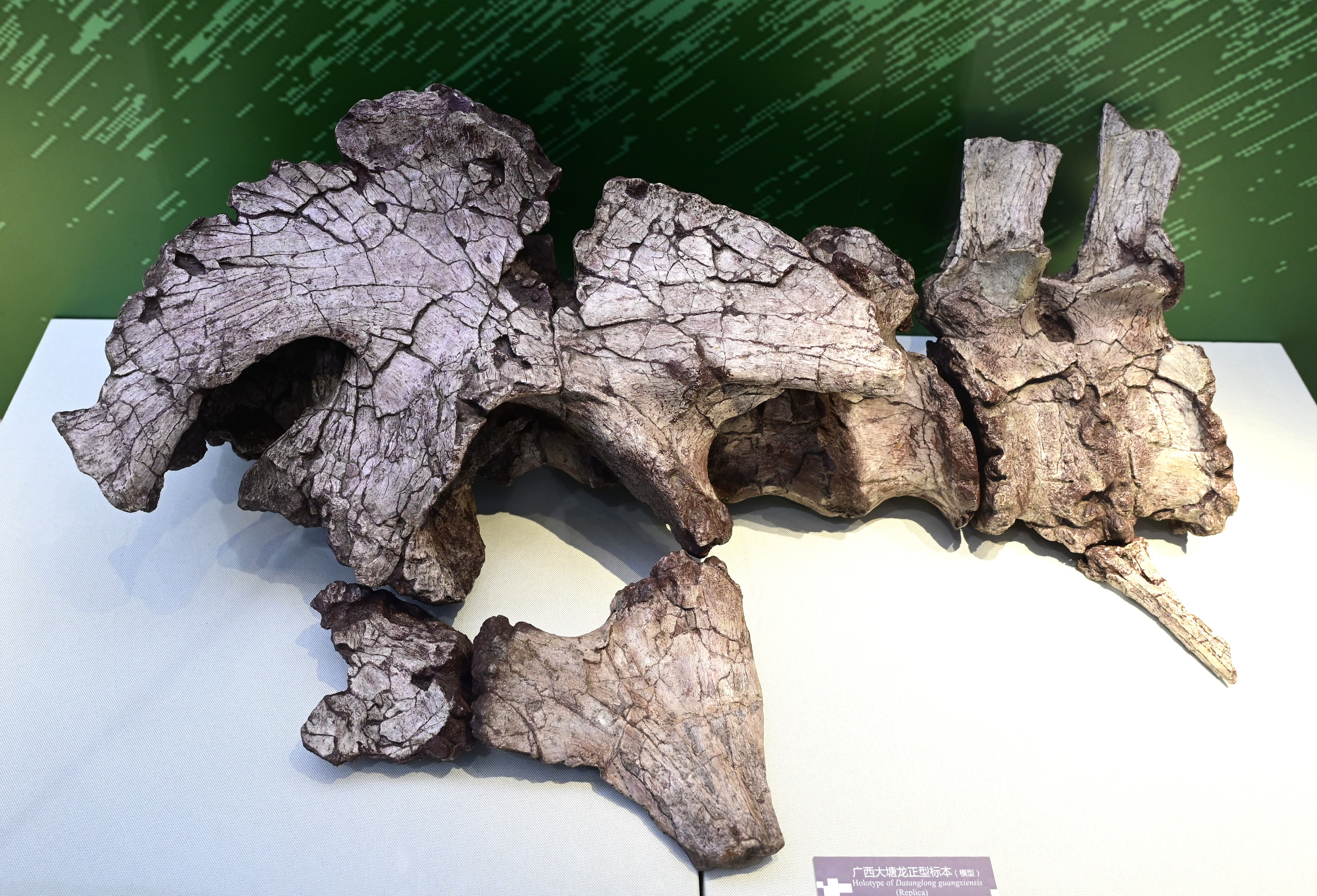
- Holotype specimen of Datanglong Guangxiensis at the National Natural History Museum of China

Scientific classification
- Kingdom: Animalia
- Phylum: Chordata
- Class: Reptilia
- Clade: Dinosauria
- Clade: Saurischia
- Clade: Theropoda
- Clade: Neotheropoda
- Clade: Averostra
- Clade: Tetanurae
- Clade: Orionides
- Genus: †Datanglong; Mo et al., 2014

Type species
- †Datanglong guangxiensis Mo et al., 2014

= Datanglong =

Datanglong Temporal range: Early Cretaceous, 125–112 Ma

Extinct genus of dinosaurs

Datanglong is an extinct genus of tetanuran theropod of uncertain taxonomic placement. It existed during Xinlong Formation, Early Cretaceous (Barremian-Albian), in what is now Guangxi China.

== Discovery and naming ==
In 2011, staff of the Geological Survey Research Institute at the village of Nazao, twenty kilometers southwest of the town of Datang, near Nanning in Guangxi, discovered the remains of a large theropod new to science. The dinosaur was named and described in 2014 as Datanglong guangxiensis, by Mo Jinyou, Zhou Fusheng, Li Guangning, Hunag Zhen and Cao Chenyun. The genus name combines a reference to the Datang basin with the Chinese word long, "dragon". The specific name guangxiensis refers to the province of Guangxi.

Datanglong guangxiensis is known from one specimen, holotype GMG 00001, which encompasses vertebrae and hip bones. There is a series of vertebrae that begins with the last dorsal (back) vertebra (according to the descriptors the fourteenth), continues over the five sacral vertebrae, and ends with the second tail vertebra. The sacrum is attached to a left ilium with the upper parts of the left pubic bone and the left ischium, and one piece of the right ilium. The bones were found in a layer of the Xinlong Formation, which was deposited sometime during the Early Cretaceous.

== Description ==
Datanglong is a large predatory theropod with a length of roughly 8 to 9 metres (26 to 30 ft). The specimen has a preserved length of about 0.7 metres (2.3 ft).

=== Distinguishing features ===
The describing authors determined some distinguishing characteristics. The last dorsal vertebra has a pleurocoel, or pneumatic cavity, that is bounded by an enlarged posterior ridge between the diapophysis and the vertebral body, by the posterior ridge between the parapophysis and the vertebral body; and by the vertebral body itself. The rear dorsal vertebra has a well-developed horizontal ridge between the prezygapophysis and the parapophysis. The last dorsal vertebra has a parapophysis that protrudes more laterally than the diapophysis. The groove in the underside of the rear blade of the ilium, serving as an attachment to the musculus caudofemoralis brevis, is shallow and the "brevis shelf", the inner surface of the medial blade wall uncovered by it, is short and shaped like a ridge. The pubic peduncle of the ilium, to which the pubic bone is attached, at the rear side transversely expands to below.

=== Skeleton ===
The last dorsal vertebra resembles those of the Ceratosauria in that the parapophysis, the lower rib joint process, extends beyond the diapophysis, the upper rib joint process. The vertebra is also clearly pneumatised but the succeeding sacral vertebrae of the sacrum are not. The first tail vertebra has a depression at the level of the probable ridge between the prezygapophysis and the parapophysis. This vertebra also has a straight chevron. The spinous processes of the tail vertebrae are broken but the remaining pieces are fairly long and expand upwards.

The upper profile of the ilium is unknown, due to damage. The front blade has a deeply drooping point with a rounded front edge. The vertical ridge in front of the hip joint does not form a medial shelf. The blade of the ilium is pierced by several pneumatic cavities. The pubic peduncle of the ilium is widely excavated at the rear and has a rectangular bottom surface, twice longer than wide. The ischial peduncle inserts into an upper cavity of the ischium like a pin.

== Phylogeny ==
The describing authors placed Datanglong in the Carcharodontosauria, in a basal position, making use of a previous cladistic analysis of Matthew Carrano. Soon after the publication, the Italian paleontologist Andrea Cau pointed out that this analysis had been strongly focused on the basal Tetanurae and therefore contained few traits of the Coelurosauria. That carried the danger that basal coelurosaurians were misplaced. Cau entered the traits of Datanglong into his own, more comprehensive, analysis and this indeed revealed that Datanglong was a basal coelurosaur. If this is correct, it would be the first known basal coelurosaur of a truly large size. He also directed attention to the fact that all synapomorphies that Datanglong shared with the Carcharodontosauria (the pneumatized cavities in the ilium and the pin-and-socket connection between the ilium and the ischium) were also shared with the Megaraptora. In 2017, Adun Samathi and Phorphen Chanthasit reported in an SVP abstract that they found Datanglong to nest in Megaraptora, "sharing the pneumaticity of the ilium with other megaraptorans." In 2024, Samathi and colleagues recovered Datanglong in this position once again, identifying nine characters to support its placement within Coelurosauria and also Megaraptora. In 2025, Kellermann, Cuesta & Rauhut consistently recovered Datanglong as an indeterminate carcharodontosaurid in all their analyses.
