= Ferganocephale =

Ferganocephale Temporal range: Middle Jurassic, ~168–164 Ma

Scientific classification
- Kingdom: Animalia
- Phylum: Chordata
- Class: Reptilia
- Clade: Dinosauria
- Clade: †Ornithischia
- Genus: †Ferganocephale; Averianov et al., 2005
- Species: †F. adenticulatum

Binomial name
- †Ferganocephale adenticulatum Averianov et al., 2005

Extinct genus of dinosaurs

Ferganocephale is a dubious genus of neornithischian dinosaur. It was from the Middle Jurassic Balabansai Svita of Kyrgyzstan. The type and only species is F. adenticulatum.

== Classification ==
Ferganocephale was originally classified in the group Pachycephalosauridae. It would then be one of the oldest known pachycephalosaurids. Robert M. Sullivan however, in 2006 disputed the pachycephalosaur classification, finding "few of the features [...] are characteristic of pachycephalosaur teeth," citing the lack of serrations on the teeth, and concluding the specimens are "too incomplete for identification". He considers the taxon a nomen dubium, and a non-pachycephalosaurid ornithischian. In 2024, a comprehensive analysis of early ornithischian evolution found Ferganocephale to be most similar to Chaoyangsauridae in overall morphology but refrained from referring it to this clade based on its lack of denticles and strength of the cingulum. The authors of this analysis instead considered it an indeterminate member of Saphornithischia.

== Discovery and naming ==
The type species, Ferganocephale adenticulatum, was first described by Averianov, Martin, and Bakirov in 2005, and is based solely on teeth from the Balabansai Svita in Fergana Valley, Kyrgyzstan, dating to the Callovian. The holotype is ZIN PH 34/42, an adult unworn tooth. The type species is Ferganocephale adenticulatum. The genus name combines the name of location it was found with the Greek kephale, "head", a reference to the presumed pachycephalosaurian affinities. The specific name means "without tooth serrations".

== See also ==
- Timeline of pachycephalosaur research
