= Xinlong Formation =

Geologic formation in Guangxi, China

- Stratigraphic range: ?Aptian-Albian; ~120–100 Ma
- Type: Geological formation

Lithology
- Primary: Sandstone, mudstone
- Other: Conglomerate, marl

Location
- Coordinates: 22.6°N 107.9°E
- Approximate paleocoordinates: 23.2°N 116.1°E
- Region: Guangxi
- Country: China
- Xinlong Formation (China) Xinlong Formation (Guangxi)

The Xinlong Formation (sometimes called the "Napai Formation", or misspelt as "Napan Formation") is an Early Cretaceous geologic formation in Guangxi, southern China.

Dinosaur remains diagnostic to the genus level are among the fossils that have been recovered from the formation.

== Fossil content ==
Color key: Taxon / Reclassified taxon / Taxon falsely reported as present / Dubious taxon or junior synonym / Ichnotaxon / Ootaxon / Morphotaxon	Notes; Uncertain or tentative taxa are in small text; ~~crossed out~~ taxa are discredited.

=== Dinosaurs ===
==== Ornithischians ====
Ornithischians of the Xinlong Formation
Genus	Species	Location	Stratigraphic position	Material	Notes	Images
Napaisaurus	N. guangxiensis			Right ilium and ischium	A styracosternan iguanodontian	
Psittacosauridae? Indet.	Indeterminate				Several different taxa of possible Psittacosaurid classification.	

==== Sauropods ====
Sauropods of the Alcântara Formation
Genus	Species	Location	Stratigraphic position	Material	Notes	Images
Asiatosaurus	A. kwangshiensis			Teeth, three cervical vertebrae and ribs	An indeterminate sauropod.	
Fusuisaurus	F. zhaoi			Partial pelvis and caudal vertebrae	A titanosauriform sauropod	
Liubangosaurus	L. hei			Fifth to ninth dorsal vertebrae	A euhelopodid somphospondylian	

==== Theropods ====
Theropods of the Xinlong Formation
Genus	Species	Location	Stratigraphic position	Material	Notes	Images
Datanglong	D. guangxiensis			Last dorsal (back) vertebra (according to the descriptors the fourteenth), continues over the five sacral vertebrae, and ends with the second tail vertebra. The sacrum is attached to a left ilium with the upper parts of the left pubic bone and the left ischium, and one piece of the right ilium	A tetanuran theropod	
Prodeinodon	P. kwangshiensis			Several teeth, fragmentary tibia, fragmentary fibula	An indeterminate theropod.	
Siamosaurus	Indeterminate, possibly S. fusuiensis			Four teeth	A spinosaurid theropod; originally known as "Sinopliosaurus" fusuiensis	

== See also ==
- List of dinosaur-bearing rock formations
  - List of stratigraphic units with few dinosaur genera
