= Ferganasaurus =

Ferganasaurus Temporal range: Middle Jurassic, Callovian

Scientific classification
- Kingdom: Animalia
- Phylum: Chordata
- Class: Reptilia
- Clade: Dinosauria
- Clade: Saurischia
- Clade: †Sauropodomorpha
- Clade: †Sauropoda
- Genus: †Ferganasaurus; Alifanov & Averianov, 2003
- Species: †F. verzilini

Binomial name
- †Ferganasaurus verzilini Alifanov & Averianov, 2003

Extinct genus of dinosaurs

Ferganasaurus (meaning "Fergana Valley lizard") is a genus of sauropod dinosaur that lived in the Balabansai Formation of Kyrgyzstan, which dates to the Callovian stage of the Middle Jurassic. It was formally described in 2003 by Alifanov and Averianov as the type species Ferganasaurus verzilini. It is believed to be similar to Rhoetosaurus.

== Discovery and naming ==
The holotype, PIN N 3042/1 (two dorsal and sixteen caudal vertebrae, a pelvis and limb bones), was discovered in 1966 by Kurzanov and Rhozdestvensky in Middle Jurassic (Callovian)-aged rocks from the Balabansai Formation, Kyrgyzstan, but it was subsequently lost with only drawings of the holotype remaining. A 2000 expedition into the Balabansai Formation yielded a second specimen of Ferganasaurus, but despite this new material, and the drawings of the originals, no cranial material has ever been attributed to Ferganasaurus. In 2003, the species Ferganasaurus verzilini was described by Alifanov & Averianov.

== Description ==
Ferganasaurus grew up to 18 metres (59 ft) long with an estimated body mass of 15 tonnes (33,000 lb).
