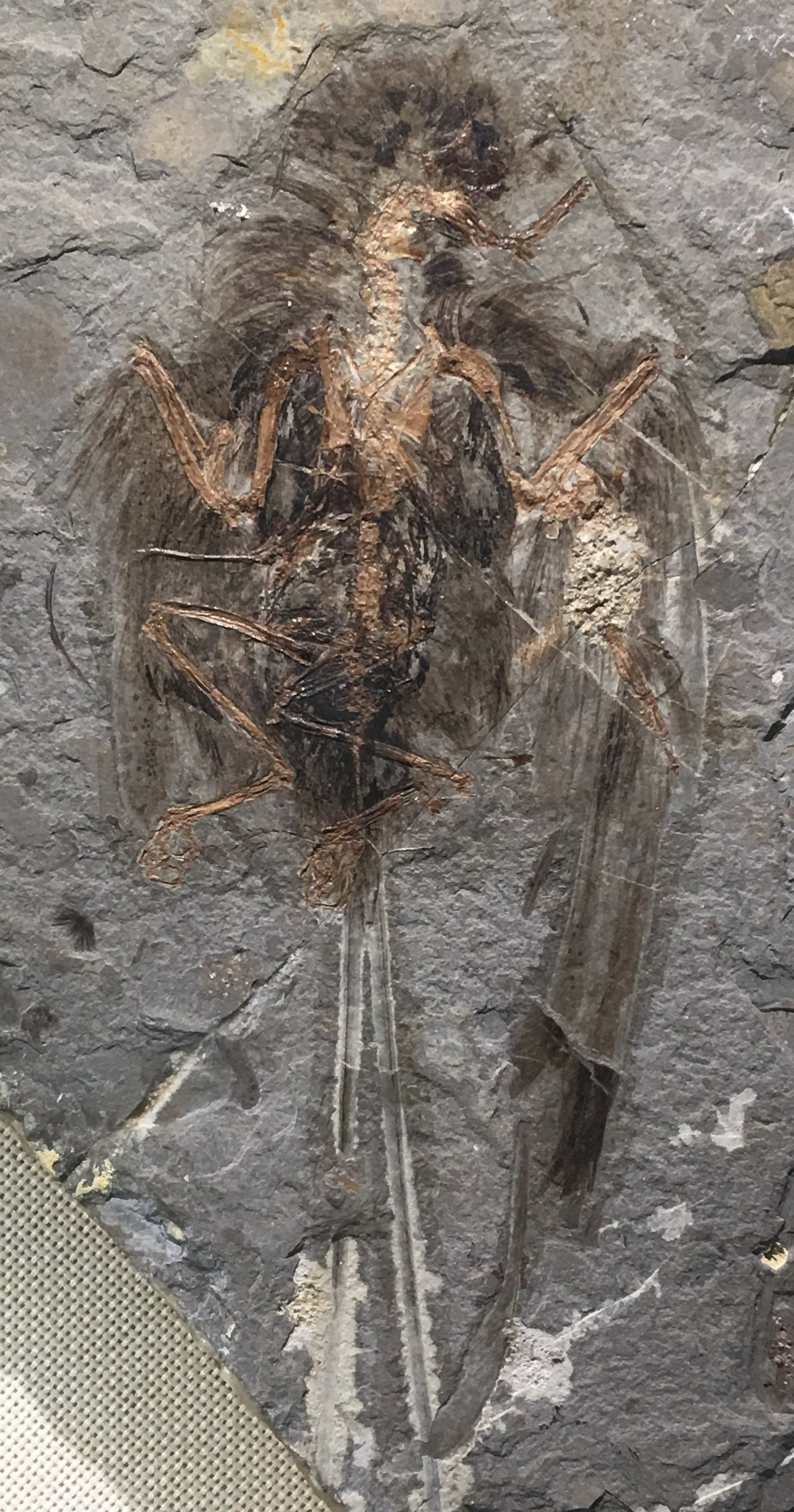
- Specimen on display at the Beijing Museum of Natural History.

Scientific classification
- Kingdom: Animalia
- Phylum: Chordata
- Class: Reptilia
- Clade: Dinosauria
- Clade: Saurischia
- Clade: Theropoda
- Clade: Avialae
- Clade: †Enantiornithes
- Clade: †Euenantiornithes
- Genus: †Cathayornis; Zhou, Jin & Zhang, 1992

Type species
- †Cathayornis yandica Zhou et al., 1992

Other Species
- †C. aberransis? Hou et al., 2002; †C. chabuensis? Li et al., 2008

= Cathayornis =

Cathayornis Temporal range: Early Cretaceous, 120 Ma

Extinct genus of birds

Cathayornis is a genus of enantiornithean birds, from the Jiufotang Formation of Liaoning, People's Republic of China. It is known definitively from only one species, Cathayornis yandica, one of the first Enantiornithes found in China. Several additional species were once incorrectly classified as Cathayornis, and have since been reclassified or regarded as nomina dubia.

== Description ==
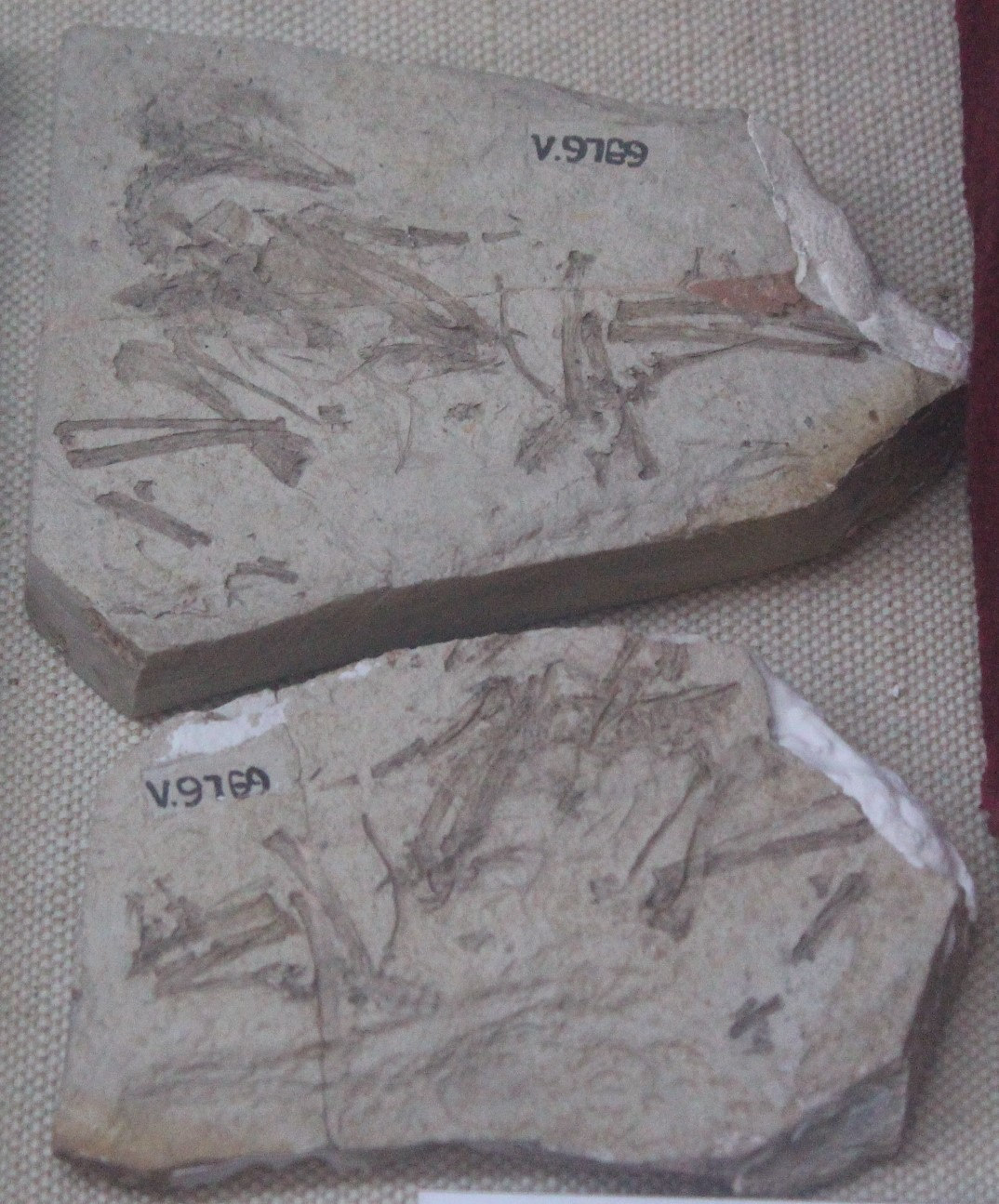
Holotype (IVPP V9769) of C. yandica, Paleozoological Museum of China

Cathayornis yandica was a small enantiornithean with a slightly elongated, toothy snout and perching feet. Like most other Enantiornithes, it had large claws on the first two fingers that supported the wing. According to most recent studies, only one specimen can be definitively assigned to this species, a fossil catalogued as number IVPP V9769 and currently housed in the collections of the Institute of Vertebrate Paleontology and Paleoanthropology in Beijing.

Cathayornis can be told apart from similar Enantiornithes (especially Sinornis, Eocathayornis, and Houornis) by its larger size, a shorter and straighter first finger with a slightly longer claw, and other anatomical details.

Two additional but very fragmentary specimens, IVPP V9936 and V10896, have been referred to C. yandica in the past, but cannot be directly compared with the type specimen because they do not preserve any of the same key parts of the skeleton.

== Classification and species ==
Paul Sereno et al., in 2002, considered Cathayornis a junior synonym of Sinornis. They interpreted the anatomies of the two as very similar and sharing key autapomorphies of the pygostyle. The first thorough review of Sinornis and Cathayornis was published by Jingmai O'Connor and Gareth Dyke in 2010. O'Connor and Dyke concluded that despite the earlier opinion of Sereno and colleagues, the two birds were not synonyms and in fact differ in several clear ways, including different proportions in the wing claws and digits, differences in the pelvis, and size of the pygostyle.

Several other species – Cathayornis aberransis, Cathayornis chabuensis and Cathayornis caudatus – had been classified as Cathayornis in the past. However, their validity and/or assignment to the genus Cathayornis has been questioned in subsequent evaluations. Jingmai O'Connor and Gareth Dyke (2010) found that many of the supposedly distinct features of C. aberransis (such as the base of a crest on the skull) had been inaccurately described, casting doubt on the few remaining features separating it from C. yandica, and suggested that further study was needed to determine its validity. Similarly, C. caudatus was so named for its supposedly bony tail lacking a pygostyle, and was further differentiated by its small size. O'Connor and Dyke re-examined the specimen and showed that the specimen is in fact only slightly smaller than the type specimen of C. yandica, and that a normal enantiornithean tail with a pygostyle is clearly visible in one of the fossil slabs, parts of the hip bones having been mistaken for unfused tail vertebrae. O'Connor and Dyke therefore considered C. caudatus a nomen dubium. They considered C. chabuenis, from the Jingchuan Formation of Inner Mongolia, to be clearly distinct from C. yandica and most likely a representative of a new genus. In a 2015 re-evaluation of supposed "cathayornithids", Wang and Liu determined that C. caudatus could be differentiated from Cathayornis and placed it in the new genus Houornis. On the other hand, they considered C. chabuensis a nomen dubium.

Other species of similar birds from the Jiufotang Formation have been regarded as synonymous with C. yandica by some researchers, including Largirostrornis sexdentoris and Cuspirostrisornis houi, though this has yet to be supported by rigorous study. O'Connor and colleagues noted that Longchengornis sanyanensis, also synonymized with C. yandica by some authors, seems to show distinct anatomy not shared with at least that species of Cathayornis.
