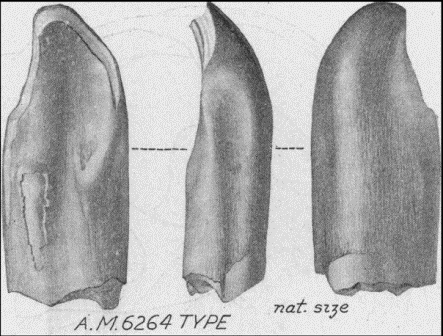
- Holotype tooth of A. mongoliensis (AMNH 6264) seen from three different angles

Scientific classification
- Kingdom: Animalia
- Phylum: Chordata
- Class: Reptilia
- Clade: Dinosauria
- Clade: Saurischia
- Clade: †Sauropodomorpha
- Clade: †Sauropoda
- Genus: †Asiatosaurus; Osborn, 1924

Type species
- †Asiatosaurus mongoliensis Osborn, 1924

Other species
- †A. kwangshiensis Hou, Yeh & Zhao, 1975

Synonyms
- Asiatosaurus mongolicus (lapsus calami)

= Asiatosaurus =

Asiatosaurus Temporal range: Early Cretaceous, 122–112 Ma

Extinct genus of dinosaurs

Asiatosaurus (meaning "Asian lizard") is an extinct genus of herbivorous sauropod dinosaur which lived during the Early Cretaceous in Mongolia and China. The type species is known only from teeth, making it difficult to rely on information until more specimens are found to expand our knowledge, and another species is known, also based on scant remains; both are now classified as nomina dubia. This genus was classified within Brachiosauridae by Hou et al. in 1975, and considered a euhelopodid by Poropat et al. in 2022.

== Species ==
=== Asiatosaurus mongoliensis ===
The type species, A. mongoliensis, was described by Osborn, in 1924, based on AMNH 6264, a broken tooth from the Öösh Formation of Övörkhangai Province, Mongolia. It was the first sauropod genus named from East-Asia.

cf. Asiatosaurus mongoliensis is known from the Shengjinkou Formation of China.

=== Asiatosaurus kwangshiensis ===
A. kwangshiensis, the second species, was described by Hou, Yeh and Zhao, in 1975 based on IVPP V4794, a tooth, three cervical vertebrae and multiple ribs from the Xinlong Formation of Guangxi, China.
