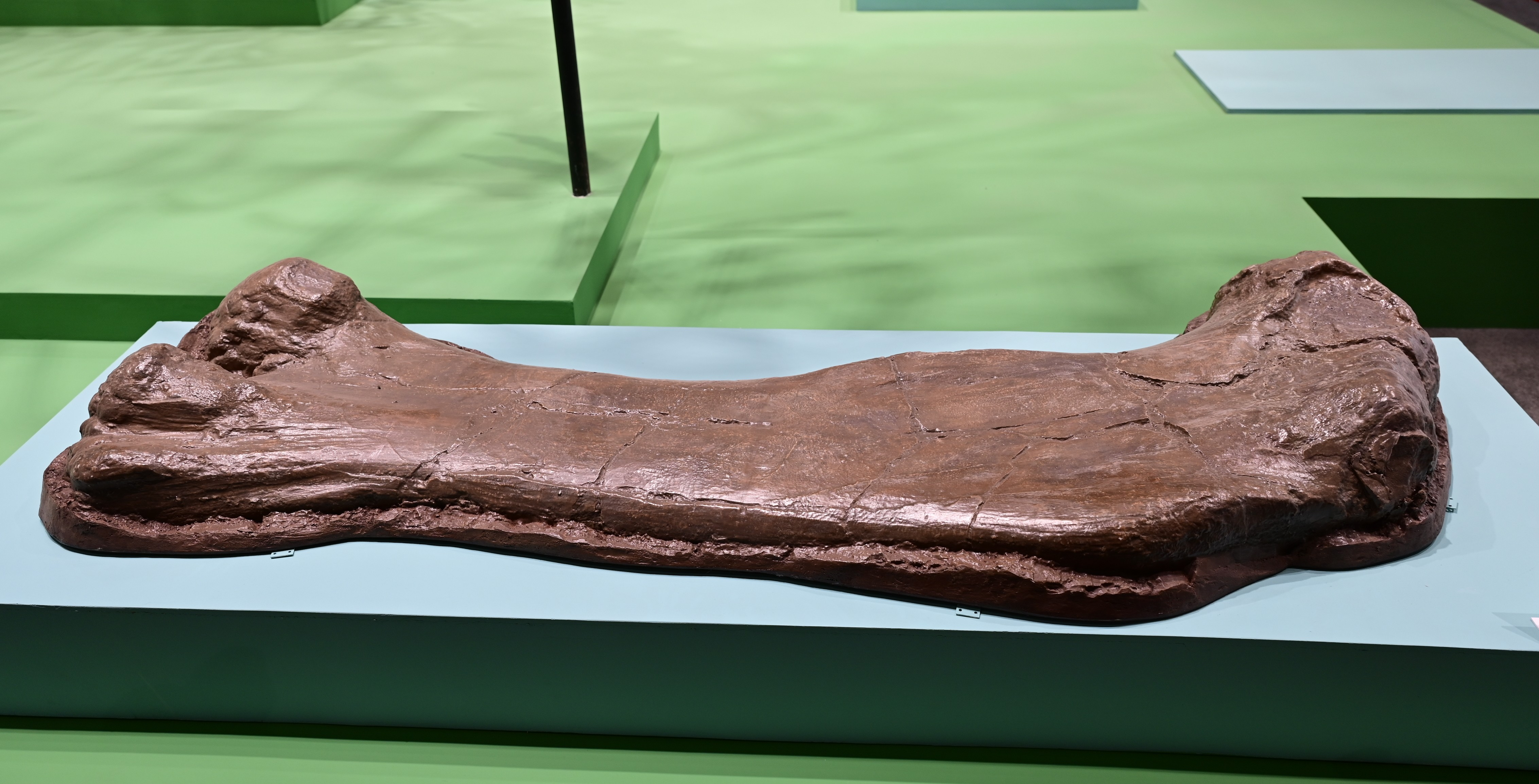
- Replica of femur, National Natural History Museum of China

Scientific classification
- Kingdom: Animalia
- Phylum: Chordata
- Clade: Dinosauria
- Clade: Saurischia
- Clade: †Sauropodomorpha
- Clade: †Sauropoda
- Clade: †Macronaria
- Clade: †Titanosauriformes
- Genus: †Fusuisaurus; Mo et al., 2006
- Species: †F. zhaoi

Binomial name
- †Fusuisaurus zhaoi Mo et al., 2006

= Fusuisaurus =

Fusuisaurus Temporal range: 120–100 Ma Early Cretaceous

Extinct genus of dinosaurs

Fusuisaurus (meaning "Fusui lizard" from the name of the county where it was discovered) is a genus of sauropod dinosaur from the Early Cretaceous of China. Fragmentary postcranial remains of this animal have been discovered in 2001 in the Xinlong Formation of Guangxi, and consist of the left ilium, left pubis, anterior caudals, most of the dorsal ribs, and distal end of the left femur. This sauropod has been described as a basal titanosauriform. The type species is F. zhaoi, named in honour of Chinese paleontologist Zhao Xijin.

== Size ==
In 2016, Gregory S. Paul gave a length of 22 metres (72 feet) and a weight of 35 tonnes (39 short tons). This sauropod was a very large animal, as its humerus was 183.5 centimetres (72.2 inches) long. Despite this, it is relatively light in body mass.

== Sources ==
- Mo, Jinyou; Wang, Wei; Huang, Zhitao; Huang, Xin & Xu, Xing (2006). "A Basal Titanosauriform from the Early Cretaceous of Guangxi, China". Acta Geologica Sinica. 80 (4): 486–489. Bibcode:2006AcGlS..80..486M. doi:10.1111/j.1755-6724.2006.tb00267.x. S2CID 129846744.
