= Cuspirostrisornis =

Cuspirostrisornis Temporal range: Early Cretaceous, 120 Ma
- Fossil specimen, Chaoyang Paleontological Museum

Scientific classification
- Kingdom: Animalia
- Phylum: Chordata
- Class: Reptilia
- Clade: Dinosauria
- Clade: Saurischia
- Clade: Theropoda
- Clade: Avialae
- Clade: †Enantiornithes
- Family: †Avisauridae
- Genus: †Cuspirostrisornis; Hou, 1997
- Species: †C. houi

Binomial name
- †Cuspirostrisornis houi Hou, 1997

Extinct genus of birds

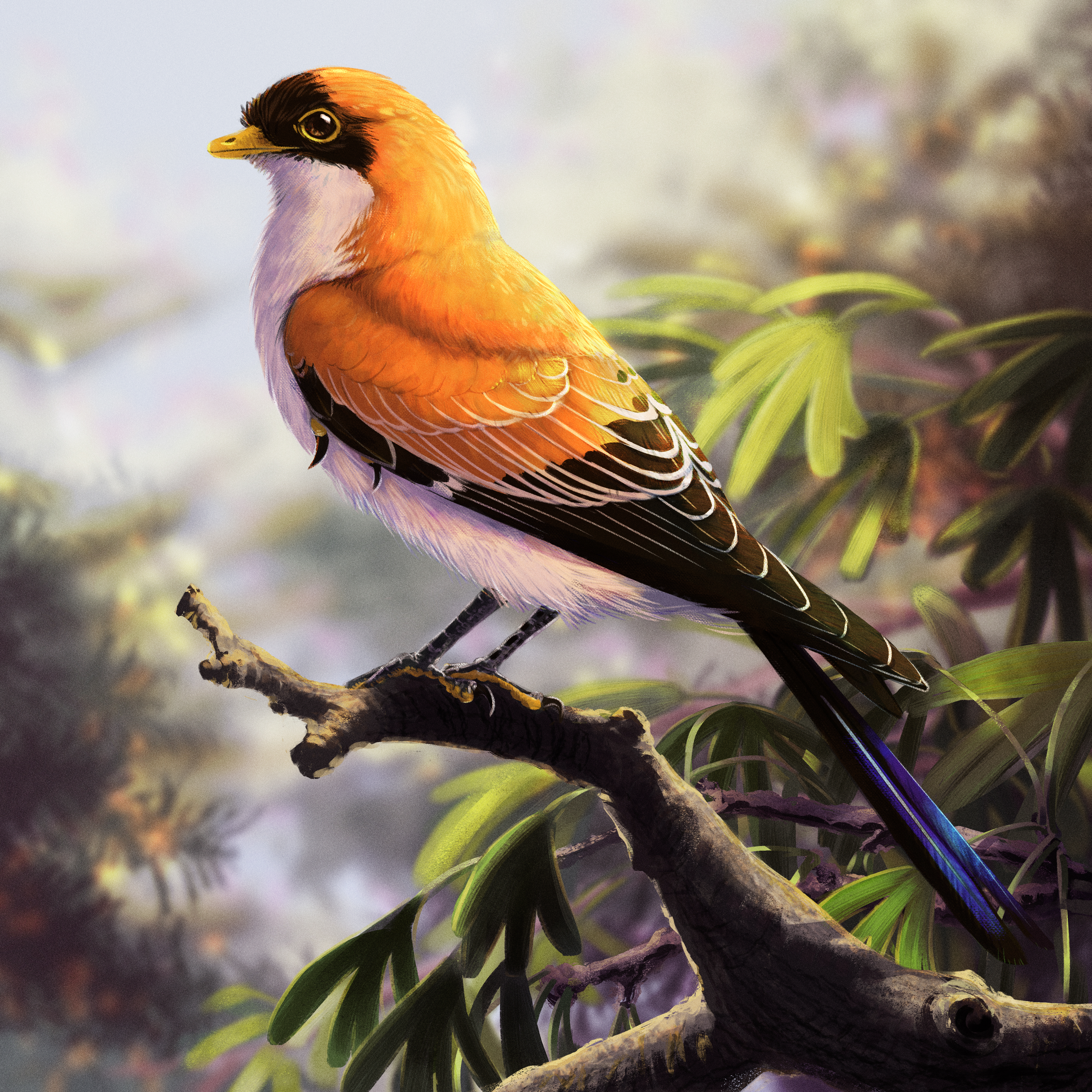
Life restoration of C. houi with ginkgoes and Araucaria pines

Cuspirostrisornis is a genus of enantiornithean bird. Only one species is known, Cuspirostrisornis houi, though some researchers believe this to be a synonym of the similar species Cathayornis yandica. It is known from one fossil found in the Jiufotang Formation in Liaoning province, People's Republic of China. The Jiufotang Formation is dated to the Early Cretaceous period, Aptian age, 120.3 +/-0.7 million years ago.

C. houi is known from a nearly complete fossil. The holotype fossil is in the collection of the Institute of Vertebrate Paleontology and Paleoanthropology in Beijing, China. The fossil is given catalog number IVPP V 10897. It was collected in 1993 by Dr. Hou Lianhai and Hou Jinfeng, the illustrator at IVPP. It was collected from light gray mudstones approximately two kilometers west of Boluochi Village, Chaoyang County, Liaoning Province.

The holotype fossil is that of a small perching bird, with a skull about 27 millimeters (1 inch) long. There are five pairs of tiny teeth in the premaxilla, and another five pairs in the anterior dentary. It had a pointed snout which Hou identified as a beak proportionally similar to the beaks of the extant genus Motacilla, the wagtails. However, some have noted that there is no evidence that the snouts of tooth-bearing prehistoric birds such as most enantiornitheans would also have possessed a horny beak, at least in a toothed part of the snout. As Cuspirostrisornis had a toothed snout, the beak which Hou presumed was present in the genus is likely a misinterpretation, similar to the hooked beak which was erroneously stated to be present in Boluochia, one of many other enantiornitheans described in the same paper.

The ulna is large and derived, with the s-shape of modern flying birds. The sternum is large, carinate, and broad.

== Etymology ==
The generic name comes from the Latin words for "pointed" and "beak", and the specific name refers to its describer, Mr. Hou Jinfeng, who is mentioned above.
