= 2002 in paleontology =

Paleontology or palaeontology is the study of prehistoric life forms on Earth through the examination of plant and animal fossils. This includes the study of body fossils, tracks (ichnites), burrows, cast-off parts, fossilised feces (coprolites), palynomorphs and chemical residues. Because humans have encountered fossils for millennia, paleontology has a long history both before and after becoming formalized as a science. This article records significant discoveries and events related to paleontology that occurred or were published in the year 2002.

== Plants ==
=== Gymnosperms ===
Name	Novelty	Status	Authors	Age	Unit	Location	Notes	Images
Ginkgo dissecta	Sp nov	Valid	Mustoe	Early Eocene	McAbee site, Kamloops Group	Canada		
Pinus matthewsii	Sp nov	Valid	McKown, Stockey, & Schweger	Pliocene	Ch'ijee's Bluff, Bluefish Basin	Canada		

=== Angiosperms ===
Name	Novelty	Status	Authors	Age	Unit	Location	Notes	Images
Hymenaea mexicana	sp nov	Valid	Poinar & Brown	Late Oligocene - early Miocene	Mexican amber	Mexico	A species of Hymenaea, producer of Mexican amber	
Trifurcatua flabellata	Gen. et sp. nov.	Valid	Mohr & Rydin	Lower Cretaceous	Crato Formation	Brazil	putative monocot	

== Arthropods ==
=== Insects ===
Name	Novelty	Status	Authors	Age	Unit	Location	Notes	Images
Cretomerobius wehri	Sp nov.	Jr synonym	Makarkin, Archibald, Oswald	Ypresian	Klondike Mountain Formation	USA	A drepanepterygine brown lacewing. Moved to Proneuronema wehri in 2016	
Dolichoderus kohlsi	Sp nov	Valid	Dlussky & Rasnitsyn	Ypresian	Green River Formation	United States; Colorado	A dolichoderine ant.	
Dolichoderus longipilosus	Sp nov	valid	Dlussky	Middle Eocene	Baltic amber	Europe	A Dolichoderine ant	Dolichoderus longipilosus
Dolichoderus nanus	Sp nov	valid	Dlussky	Middle Eocene	Baltic amber	Europe	A Dolichoderine ant	Dolichoderus nanus
Eoformica globularis	Sp nov	Valid	Dlussky & Rasnitsyn	Ypresian	Green River Formation	United States; Wyoming	A ant of uncertain placement.	
Eoformica magna	Sp nov	Valid	Dlussky & Rasnitsyn	Ypresian	Green River Formation	United States; Wyoming	A ant of uncertain placement.	
Fibla (Reisserella) cerdanica	Comb nov	Valid	(Nel)	Late Miocene		Spain	An inocellid snakefly, moved from Miofibla Nel, 1994	Fibla cerdanica
Formica gustawi	Sp nov	valid	Dlussky	Middle Eocene	Baltic amber	Europe	A formicine ant	Formica gustawi
Klondikia	Gen et sp nov	Valid	Dlussky & Rasnitsyn	Ypresian	Klondike Mountain Formation	United States; Washington	An ant form genus of uncertain placement. Type species K. whiteae	
Kohlsimyrma	Gen et 2 sp nov	Valid	Dlussky & Rasnitsyn	Ypresian	Green River Formation	United States; Colorado	An ant form genus of uncertain placement. Type species K. laticeps also includes K. gracilis and K. longiceps	
Mianeuretus eocenicus	Sp nov	Valid	Dlussky & Rasnitsyn	Ypresian	Green River Formation	United States; Colorado	An aneuretine ant	
Myrmecites	Gen et sp nov	Valid	Dlussky & Rasnitsyn	Ypresian	Green River Formation	United States; Colorado	A myrmicine ant form genus. Type species M. rotundiceps	
Pachycondyla labandeirai	Sp nov	Valid	Dlussky & Rasnitsyn	Ypresian	Green River Formation	United States; Wyoming	A ponerine ant.	
Ponerites	Gen, 3 sp et 1 comb nov	Valid	Dlussky & Rasnitsyn	Ypresian	Green River Formation	United States; Colorado	A ponerine ant form genus. Type species P. eocenicus Also includes P. coloradensis, P. hypoponeroides, & P. umbrus (moved from Ponera umbrus 1932)	
Proiridomyrmex	Gen et sp nov	Valid	Dlusskys & Rasnitsyn	Ypresian	Green River Formation	United States; Colorado	A dolichoderine ant form genus Type species P. vetulus	
Solenopsites	Gen et sp nov	Valid	Dlussky & Rasnitsyn	Ypresian	Green River Formation	United States; Colorado	A myrmicine ant form genus. Type species S. minutus	
Wesmaelius mathewesi	sp. nov	valid	Makarkin, Archibald, Oswald	Ypresian	Coldwater Formation	Canada	first description of fossil Wesmaelius	

== Conodonts ==
=== New taxa ===
Name	Novelty	Status	Authors	Age	Unit	Location	Notes	Images
Eolinguipolygnathus	Gen et comb nov	valid	Bardashev, Weddige, & Ziegler	early Devonian			An eopolygnathid conodont, type species E. dehiscens moved from Polygnathus dehiscens (1967)	

== Archosauromorphs ==
=== Dinosaurs ===
==== New taxa ====
Data courtesy of George Olshevsky's dinosaur genera list.

Name	Novelty	Status	Authors	Age	Unit	Location	Notes	Images
Agnosphitys	gen et sp nov	Valid	Fraser, Padian, Walkden, & Davis	late Triassic		England	A possible chimera	Agnosphitys cromhallensis
Anabisetia	gen et sp nov	Valid	Coria & Calvo	Late Cretaceous	Cerro Lisandro Formation	Argentina	An Iguanodont	Anabisetia saldiviai
Aucasaurus	gen et sp nov	Valid	Coria, Chiappe, & Dingus	Santonian	Anacleto Formation	Argentina	An Abelisaurid	Aucasaurus garridoi
"Byranjaffia"	gen nov	Nomen nudum	Novacek	Late Cretaceous		Mongolia	Officially named Byronosaurus	
Crichtonsaurus	gen et sp nov	Valid	Dong	Late Cretaceous	Sunjiawan Formation	China	An ankylosaurid	
"Cryptovolans"	gen et sp nov	Junior synonym	Czerkas, Zhang, Li, & Li	Aptian	Jiufotang Formation	China	Jr synonym of Microraptor	
"Epidendrosaurus"	gen et sp nov	junior synonym	Zhang, Zhou, Xu, & Wang	Late Jurassic	Yixian Formation	China	jr synonym of Scansoriopteryx	
Erliansaurus	gen et sp nov	Valid	Xu et al.	Late Cretaceous	Iren Dabasu Formation	Mongolia	A Therizinosauroid	Erliansaurus bellamanus
"Fusinasus"	gen et sp nov	Junior synonym of Eotyrannus	Hutt	Early Cretaceous	Wessex Formation	England	Jr synonym of Eotyrannus	
"Huaxiasaurus"		Nomen nudum	Rey				Officially named Huaxiagnathus in 2004	
Incisivosaurus	gen et sp nov	Valid	Xu, Wang, & Chang	Barremian	Yixian Formation	China	An Oviraptorosaurid	
Liaoceratops	gen et sp nov	Valid	Xu et al.	Berremian	Yixian Formation	China	A Ceratopsian	Liaoceratops yanzigouensis
Pycnonemosaurus	gen et sp nov	Valid	Kellner & Campos	Bauru-type red conglomerate sandstone	Maastrichtian	Brazil	An Abelisaurid	
Scansoriopteryx	gen et sp nov	Valid	Czerkas & Yuan	Late Jurassic	Yixian Formation	China	Possible junior synonym of Epidendrosaurus	
Sinovenator	gen et sp nov	Valid	Xu et al.	Early Cretaceous	Yixian Formation	China	A Troodontid	
Sphaerotholus	Gen. 2 sp. nov	Valid	Williamson & Carr	Late Cretaceous	Kirtland Formation, Hell Creek Formation	United States (Montana, New Mexico)	A pachycephalosaurine; originally described with two species, S. goodwini and S. buchholtzae.	Sphaerotholus

=== Birds ===
==== New taxa ====
Name	Status	Novelty	Authors	Age	Unit	Location	Notes	Images
Adelalopus	Valid	Gen. et Sp. nov.	Mayr & Smith	Early Oligocene	Borgloon Formation	Belgium; Flemish Brabant	A palaelodid Type species A. hoogbutseliensis	
Aegialornis germanicus	Valid	Sp. nov.	Mlíkovský	Middle Eocene		Germany; Saxony-Anhalt	An Aegialornithid	
Archaeotrogon nocturnus	Valid	Sp. nov.	Mlíkovský	Eocene or Early Oligocene	Phosphorites du Quercy	France	An archaeotrogonid	
Athene trinacriae	Valid	Sp. nov.	Pavia & Mourer-Chauviré	Pleistocene		Italia; Sicily	A strigid owl.	
Belonopterus downsi	Valid	Sp. nov.	Campbell, Jr.	Late Pleistocene	La Brea Tar Pits	USA; California	A charadriid lapwing.	
Camusia quintanai	Valid	Gen. et Sp. nov.	Seguí	Pliocene	Vroeg-Midden	Spain; Menorca	A gruid crane.	
Cathayornis aberransis	?Valid	Sp. nov.	Hou, Zhou, Zhang, & Gu	Valanginian	Jiufotang Formation	China	A cathayornithid	Cathayornis
Cimolopteryx petra	Valid	Sp. nov.	Hope	Maastrichtian	Lance Formation	USA; Wyoming	A cimolopterygid moved to Lamarqueavis petra in 2010	
Collocalia manuoi	Valid	Sp. nov.	Steadman	Quaternary		Cook Islands	An apodid swiftlet.	
Colymboides belgicus	Valid	Sp. nov.	Mayr & Smith	Early Oligocene	Borgloon Formation	Belgium; Flemish Brabant	A gaviid.	
Delphinornis arctowskii	Valid	Sp. nov.	Myrcha et al.	Eocene	La Meseta Formation	Antarctica	A spheniscid penguin.	
Delphinornis gracilis	Valid	Comb. nov.	(Wiman)	Eocene	La Meseta Formation	Antarctica	A spheniscid penguin Moved from Ichtyopteryx gracilis (1905)	
Enaliornis seeleyi	Valid	Sp. nov.	Galton & Martin	Early Cretaceous		UK; England	An enaliornithid	
Eocathayornis	Valid	Gen et Sp nov.	Zhou	Valanginian	Jiufotang Formation	China	An enantiornithelian, Type species E. walkeri	
Giganhinga	Valid	Gen et Sp nov.	Rinderknecht & Noriega	Pliocene-Pleistocene	San José Formation	Uruguay	An anhingid Type species G. kiyuensis	
Gigantohierax	Valid	Gen et Sp. nov.	Arredondo & Arredondo	Quaternary	Cave deposits	Cuba	An Accipitridae; Type species G. suarezi	
Halimornis	Valid	Gen et Sp nov.	Chiappe, Lamb Jr., & Ericson	Early-Middle Campanian	Mooreville Chalk Formation	USA; Alabama	An Euenantiornithalean; Type species H. thompsoni	
Hesperornis bairdi	Valid	Sp. nov.	Martin & Lim	Campanian	Pierre Shale Formation	USA; South Dakota	A hesperornithid	
Hesperornis chowi	Valid	Sp. nov.	Martin & Lim	Campanian	Pierre Shale Formation	USA; South Dakota	A hesperornithid	
Hesperornis macdonaldi	Valid	Sp. nov.	Martin & Lim	Campanian	Pierre Shale Formation	USA; South Dakota	A hesperornithid	
Hesperornis mengeli	Valid	Sp. nov.	Martin & Lim	Campanian	Pierre Shale Formation	Canada; Manitoba	A hesperornithid	
?Idiornis anthracinus	Valid	Sp. nov.	Mayr	Middle Eocene		Germany; Saxony-Anhalt	A cuculid cuckoo Moved to Dynamopterus anthracinus (2013)	
Jeholornis	Valid	Gen et Sp. nov.	Zhou & Zhang	Early Cretaceous	Jiufotang Formation	China	A jeholornithid Type species J. prima	Jeholornis prima
Jiliniornis	Valid	Gen et Sp nov.	Hou & Ericson	Middle Eocene	Huadian Formation	China	A charadriid Type species J. huadianensis	
Jinzhouornis	jr synonym	Gen et 2 Sp. nov.	Hou, Zhou, Zhang, & Gu	Early Cretaceous	Yixian Formation	China	A confuciusornithid Type species J. yixianensis, also included J. zhangjiyingia Genus and species synonymized with Confuciusornis sanctus 2018	Confuciusornis sanctus
Jixiangornis	Valid	Gen et Sp nov.	Ji et al.	Early Cretaceous	Jiufotang Formation	China	An avialaen Type species J. orientalis	Jixiangornis orientalis
Larus utunui	Valid	Sp. nov.	Steadman	Subrecent		French Polynesia	A larid gull.	
Marambiornis	Valid	Gen et Sp nov.	Myrcha et al.	Eocene	La Meseta Formation	Antarctica	A penguin Type species M. exilis	
Masillastega	Valid	Gen et Sp nov.	Mayr	Early Middle Eocene	Messel Formation	Germany; Hessen	A sulid Type species M. rectirostris	Masillastega rectirostris
Mesetaornis	Valid	Gen et Sp nov.	Myrcha et al.	Eocene	La Meseta Formation	Antarctica	A penguin. Type species M. polaris	
Miodytes serbicus	Valid	Gen et Sp nov.	Dimitreijevich, Gál, & Kessler	Early Miocene	Valjevo Basin	Serbia	A podicipedid grebe.	
Novacaesareala	Valid	Gen et Sp nov.	Parris & Hope	Early Danian	Hornerstown Formation	USA; New Jersey	A possible torotigid Type species N. hungerfordi	
Oligosylphe	Valid	Gen et Sp nov.	Mayr & Smith	Early Oligocene	Borgloon Formation	Belgium; Flemish Brabant	A sylphornithid Type species O. mourerchauvireae	
Omnivoropteryx	Valid	Gen et Sp nov.	Czerkas & Ji	Early Cretaceous	Jiufutang Formation	China	An Omvivoropterygidae; Type species O. sinousaorum	
Oxyura doksana	Valid	Sp. nov.	Mlíkovský	Early Miocene		Czech Republic	A possible sea duck.	
Paraortygoides radagasti	Valid	Sp. nov.	Dyke * Gulas	Early Eocene	London Clay	UK; England	A gallinuloidid	
Parasarcoramphus	Valid	Gen et Sp nov.	Mourer-Chauviré	Bartonian-Late Oligocene	Phosphorites du Quercy	France; Occitanie	A cathartid. Type species P. milneedwardsi	
Plesiocathartes geiselensis	Valid	Sp. nov.	Mayr	Middle Eocene		Germany; Saxony-Anhalt	A leptosomiformean.	
Plesiocathartes kelleri	Valid	Sp. nov.	Mayr	Middle Eocene	Messel Formation	Germany; Hessen	A Leptosomiformean.	
Polarornis	Valid	Gen et Sp nov.	Chatterjee	Late Cretaceous	López de Bertodano Formation; Seymour Island	Antarctica	A vegaviid Type species P. gregorii	
Sapeornis	Valid	Gen et Sp nov.	Zhou & Zhang	Early Cretaceous	Jiufotang Formation	China	A omnivoropterygid Type species S. chaoyangensis	Sapeornis chaoyangensis
Septentrogon	Valid	Gen et Sp nov.	Kristoffersen	Ypresian	Fur Formation	Denmark	A trogonid Type species S. madseni	
Shenzhouraptor	valid	Gen et sp nov.	Ji et al.	Early Cretaceous	Jiufotang Formation	China	An Avialae. Type species S. sinensis	Shenzhouraptor sinensis
Spheniscus urbinai	Valid	Sp. nov.	Stucchi	Late Miocene-Early Pliocene	Pisco Formation	Peru	A spheniscid penguin.	
Taubatornis	Valid	Gen et sp nov.	Olson & de Alvarenga	Late Oligocene or Early Miocene	Tremembé Formation	Brazil	A teratorn Type species T. campbelli	
Teratornis olsoni	jr synonym	Sp. nov.	Arredondo & Arredondo	Pleistocene	Cave deposits	Cuba	A teratorn Moved to Oscaravis olsoni in 2009	
Teratornis woodburnensis	Valid	Sp. nov.	Campbell & Stenger	Late Pleistocene		USA; Oregon	A teratorn	
Teviornis	Valid	Gen et Sp nov.	Kurochkin, Dyke, & Karhu	Maastrichtian	Nemegt Formation	Mongolia	A presbyornithid Type species T. gobiensis	
Tyto balearica cyrneichnusae	Valid	Subsp. nov.	Louchart	Late Pleistocene		France; Corsica	A tytonid owl subspecies.	

=== Plesiosaurs ===
==== New taxa ====
Name	Novelty	Status	Authors	Age	Unit	Location	Notes	Images
Edgarosaurus	Gen et sp nov	Valid	Druckenmiller	Albian	Thermopolis Shale	United States; Montana	A polycotylid Type species E. muddi	Edgarosaurus muddi
Kaiwhekea	Gen et sp nov	Valid	Cruickshank & Fordyce	Maastrichtian	Katiki Formation	New Zealand; Otago	An aristonectine elasmosaurid Type species K. katiki	Kaiwhekea katiki
Vinialesaurus	Gen et comb nov	Valid	Gasparini et al.	Oxfordian	Jagua Formation	Cuba	A cryptoclidid Type species V. caroli Moved from Cryptocleidus caroli (1949)	

=== Pterosaurs ===
In October, a partial Mesadacylus wing was discovered in the Kingsview Quarry of Colorado. This find marks the first time that a Morrison pterosaur has been found at more than one site in the formation.

==== New taxa ====
Name	Novelty	Status	Authors	Age	Unit	Location	Notes	Images
Austriadactylus	gen et sp nov	Valid	Dalla Vecchia, Wild, & Reitner	Late Triassic	Seefelder Beds	Austria		
Hatzegopteryx	gen et sp nov	Valid	Buffetaut, Grigorescu, & Csiki	Late Cretaceous	Densuș-Ciula Formation	Romania	possibly a jr synonym of Quetzalcoatlus	Hatzegopteryx
Jeholopterus	gen et sp nov	Valid	Wang & Zhou	Late Jurassic	Daohugou Beds	China		Jeholopterus ningchengensis
Piksi	gen et sp nov	Valid	Varricchio	Late Cretaceous	Two Medicine Formation	United States	At first thought to be a bird, but subsequently reinterpreted as a pterosaur, likely a member of Ornithocheiroidea.	
Pterorhynchus	gen et sp nov	Valid	Czerkas & Ji	Late Jurassic	Daohugou Beds	China		
Thalassodromeus	gen et sp nov	Valid	Kellner & Campos	early Cretaceous	Santana Formation	Brazil		Thalassodromeus sethi
Utahdactylus	gen et sp nov	Valid	Czerkas & Mickelson	Late Jurassic	Morrison Formation, Utah	USA		

== Lepidosauromorphs ==
=== Squamates ===
==== New taxa ====
Name	Novelty	Status	Authors	Age	Unit	Location	Notes	Images
"Lakumasaurus"	Gen et sp nov	Jr synonym	Novas et al.	Late Campanian	Santa Marta Formation	Antarctica	Genus synonymized with Taniwhasaurus in 2007	Taniwhasaurus antarcticus
Prognathodon currii	Sp nov	Valid	Christiansen & Bonde	Late Campanian	Mishash Formation	Israel	A large mosasaur	Prognathodon currii

== Synapsids ==
=== Non-mammalian ===
Name	Novelty	Status	Authors	Age	Unit	Location	Notes	Images
Criocephalosaurus	gen nov	Valid	Kammerer & Sidor	Upper Permian		South Africa	A dinocephalian. Replacement name for Criocephalus Broom, 1928, preoccupied by Criocephalus Mulsant 1839.	
Kitchinganomodon	Gen nov	Valid	Maisch	Upper Permian		South Africa	A dicynodont. New genus for "Platycyclops" crassus Broom, 1948.	
Kwazulusaurus	gen et sp nov	Valid	Maisch	Upper Permian	Beaufort Group	South Africa	A dicynodont. The type species is Kwazulusaurus shakai.	
Lanthanocephalus	gen et sp nov	Preoccupied	Modesto, Rubidge, & Welman	Upper Permian	Koonap Formation	South Africa	Genus preoccupied by Lanthanocephalus Williams & Starmer, 2000, moved to the replacement Lanthanostegus in 2003	
Neotrirachodon	gen et sp nov	Valid	Tatarinov	Middle Triassic	Donguz Formation	Russia	A cynodont. The type species is Neotrirachodon expectatus.	
Ruhuhucerberus	gen et sp nov	Valid	Maisch	Upper Permian	Kawinga Formation	Tanzania	A gorgonopsian. The type species is Ruhuhucerberus terror.	
Titanogorgon	gen nov	Valid	Maisch	Upper Permian	Kawinga Formation	Tanzania	A gorgonopsian. New genus for "Gorgonognathus" maximus von Huene, 1950.	
