= Kompsornis =

Kompsornis Temporal range: Early Cretaceous, 120 Ma

Scientific classification
- Kingdom: Animalia
- Phylum: Chordata
- Class: Reptilia
- Clade: Dinosauria
- Clade: Saurischia
- Clade: Theropoda
- Clade: Avialae
- Order: †Jeholornithiformes
- Genus: †Kompsornis; Wang et al., 2020
- Species: †K. longicaudus

Binomial name
- †Kompsornis longicaudus Wang et al., 2020

Extinct genus of dinosaurs

Kompsornis (meaning "elegant bird") is an extinct genus of avialan dinosaurs that lived during the Early Cretaceous period of China. The type and only known species is Kompsornis longicaudus; the specific name means "long-tailed". It is known from only a single fossil specimen from the Jiufotang Formation. Kompsornis was closely related to the well-known Jeholornis, another long-tailed avialan from China, but differs from it in features of its skeleton, particularly the fusion and growth rate of its bones. Like other jeholornithiforms, Kompsornis was a long-tailed avialan with long wings and possessed little or no teeth, with none identified in the single specimen of Kompsornis.

== Classification ==
Kompsornis was described and named by Wang and colleagues in 2020 from the sole specimen AGB-6997, an articulated complete skeleton preserved on a single slab, and was recognised as a jeholornithiform avialan. Their description included a comprehensive comparison between Kompsornis and the type specimens of other named jeholornithiform species, including all species of Jeholornis, Shenzhouraptor sinensis, Dalianraptor cuhe and the possible euavialan Jixiangornis orientalis. They concluded that Kompsornis was a distinct species from all other jeholornithiform species, and that they all represented valid species except for Dalianraptor, which was determined to be an artificial forgery of different specimens and lacking any diagnostic characteristics.

A phylogenetic analysis supported this conclusion, which recovered Kompsornis as a jeholornithiform most closely related to Jeholornis prima and J. curvipes (Jeholornis 'sensu stricto'), and more derived than Shenzhouraptor, J. palmapenis and Jixiangornis:

- Jeholornithiformes
  - Jixiangornis
  - - Jeholornis palmapenis
    - Shenzhouraptor sinensis
    - - Kompsornis
      - - Jeholornis prima
        - Jeholornis curvipes

Kompsornis is distinguished from other jeholornithiform species by traits such as a more posteriorly directed pubis, especially elongated caudal vertebrae in the tail, extreme tail length, longer forelimbs, and features of the sternum and coracoid in the shoulder. The hip and sternum are also more extensively fused than in other jeholornithiforms, despite its immaturity, and the skeleton overall has more bird-like growth patterns than in other sampled jeholornithiforms.

== Palaeobiology ==
The growth rate of Kompsornis was sampled from a cross-section of a rib bone and compared to those of Jeholornis sp. The specimen was determined to be at least four years old and approaching maturity, but was not yet fully grown. Kompsornis possessed a different growth strategy to Jeholornis, particularly in the fusion of the sternum and hips prior to skeletal maturity, which often remain unfused even in larger and older specimens of Jeholornis. Such differences in growth patterns may be evidence that jeholornithiforms evolved distinct growth strategies to adopt different ecologies in the same environment.

The sternum is completely fused, and possesses a well-developed keel and a robust xiphoid process, suggesting that Kompsornis was a powerful flier.
