= Ellisella paraplexauroides =

Conservation status
- Vulnerable (IUCN 3.1)

Scientific classification
- Kingdom: Animalia
- Phylum: Cnidaria
- Subphylum: Anthozoa
- Class: Octocorallia
- Order: Scleralcyonacea
- Family: Ellisellidae
- Genus: Ellisella
- Species: E. paraplexauroides

Binomial name
- Ellisella paraplexauroides Stiasny, 1936

Species of coral

Ellisella paraplexauroides is a vulnerable gorgonian considered among the largest colonial invertebrates of the Mediterranean Sea.

It has an unusual restricted and uneven distribution, with isolated and extremely sparse colonies in a few sites in the Alboran Sea, the coasts of Algeria and Tunisia, and in the Strait of Sicily, with an exceptionally dense and rich population around the Natura 2000 site on Chafarinas Islands, where its colonies make a unique seascape.
