= Ctenocella lyra =

Scientific classification
- Kingdom: Animalia
- Phylum: Cnidaria
- Subphylum: Anthozoa
- Class: Octocorallia
- Order: Scleralcyonacea
- Family: Ellisellidae
- Genus: Ctenocella
- Species: C. lyra

Binomial name
- Ctenocella lyra Toeplitz, 1919

Species of cnidarian

Ctenocella lyra is a species of coral that was first described by Charlotte Matthes Toeplitz in the year 1919.
