= Ctenocella ramosa =

Scientific classification
- Kingdom: Animalia
- Phylum: Cnidaria
- Subphylum: Anthozoa
- Class: Octocorallia
- Order: Scleralcyonacea
- Family: Ellisellidae
- Genus: Ctenocella
- Species: C. ramosa

Binomial name
- Ctenocella ramosa (Simpson, 1910)

Synonyms
- Ellisella ramosa (Simpson, 1910); Scirpearia ramosa Simpson, 1910

Species of coral

Ctenocella ramosa is a species of coral that was first described by James Jenkins Simpson in 1910.
