= Ctenocella ochracea =

Scientific classification
- Kingdom: Animalia
- Phylum: Cnidaria
- Subphylum: Anthozoa
- Class: Octocorallia
- Order: Scleralcyonacea
- Family: Ellisellidae
- Genus: Ctenocella
- Species: C. ochracea

Binomial name
- Ctenocella ochracea (Studer, 1890)

Synonyms
- Scirpearia ochracea Studer, 1890

Species of coral

Ctenocella ochracea is a species of coral that was first described by Theophil Studer in 1890.
