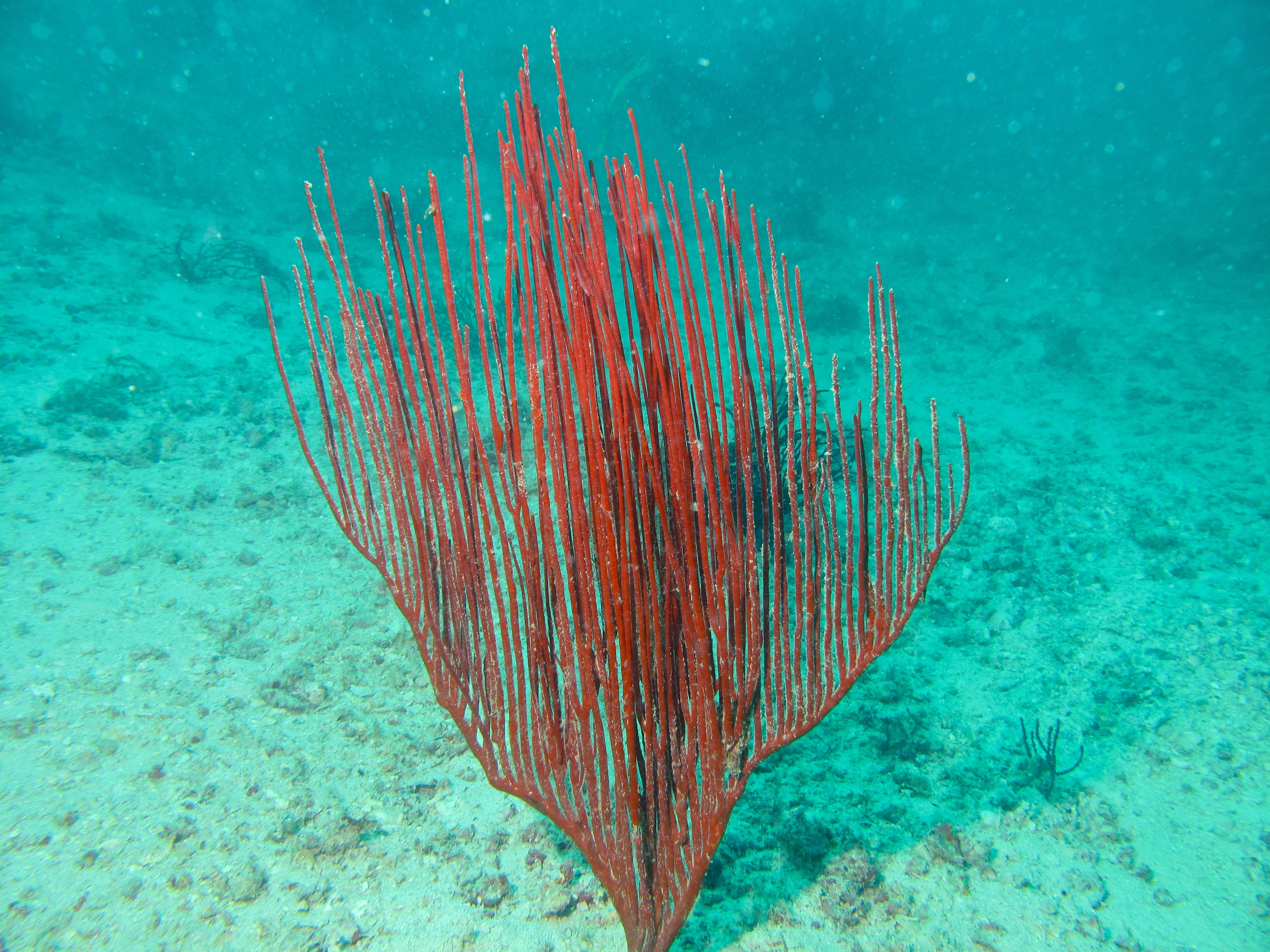

Scientific classification
- Kingdom: Animalia
- Phylum: Cnidaria
- Subphylum: Anthozoa
- Class: Octocorallia
- Order: Scleralcyonacea
- Family: Ellisellidae
- Genus: Ctenocella
- Species: C. pectinata

Binomial name
- Ctenocella pectinata (Pallas, 1766)

Synonyms
- Ellisella pectinata (Pallas, 1766); Gorgonia pectinata Pallas, 1766; Pterogorgia pectinata (Pallas, 1766)

= Ctenocella pectinata =

Species of cnidarian

Ctenocella pectinata, commonly known as the harp coral, is a species of coral that was first described by Peter Simon Pallas in 1766 at the depths of 20–30 m (66–98 ft). The species is an azooxanthellate.

== Structure ==
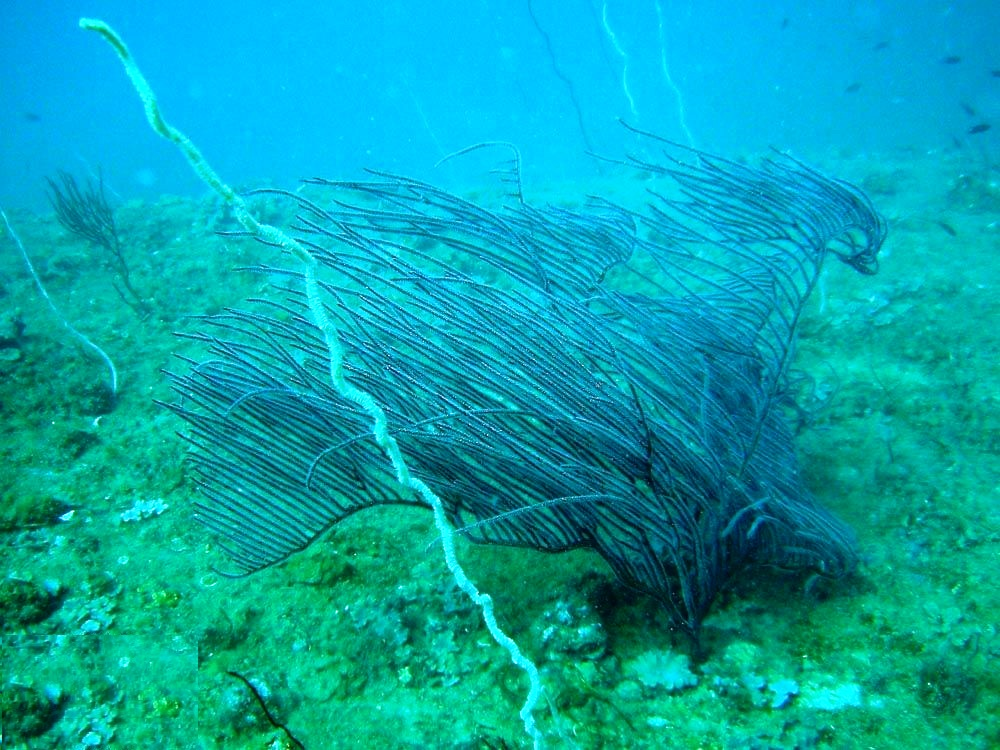
Azure blue colored specimen

The structure of Ctenocella pectinata resembles that of a harp, hence its common name. Its structure also represents a comb with vertical branches, and a lyre. Its main stem is about 2 cm long and with a diameter of 5 mm on average. The main branches stretch almost horizontally outward and then they curve slowly upward.

Ctenocella pectinata color can be dull, dark red, and maroon. It can be also creamy white, and azure. Its polyps are white. Their color stays permanent.

== Distribution and habitat ==
Ctenocella pectinata has been found on the coasts of Australia, Southeast Asia, Japan, and Florida, in marine environments. The species is also widely distributed in the Indian Ocean, East Indian region, and the Chinese seas.

== Feeding ==
Ctenocella pectinata is a suspension feeder. It uses its polyps to capture and filter tiny food particles carried by water currents.
