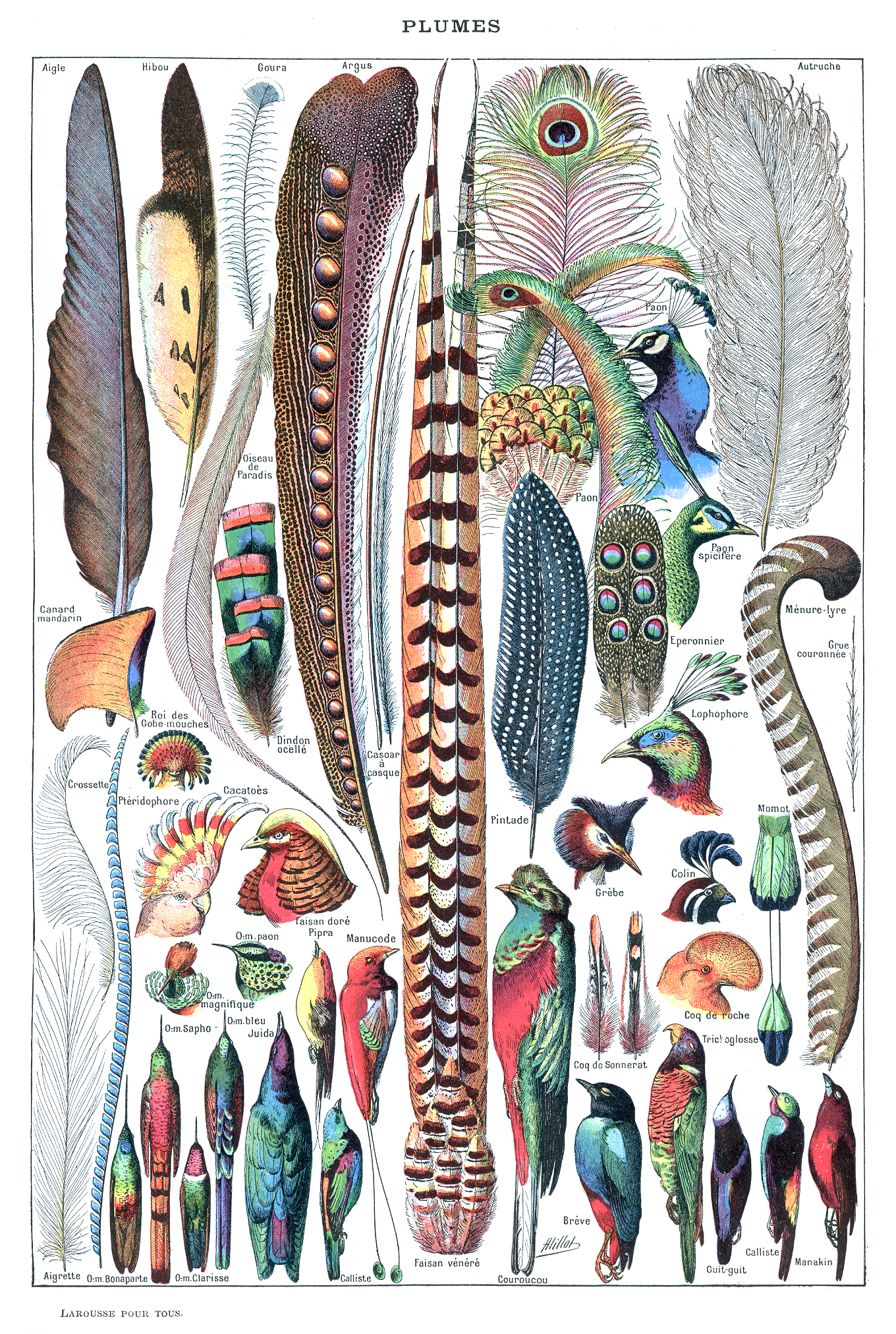
- Illustration showing various types of feathers

Scientific classification
- Domain: Eukaryota
- Kingdom: Animalia
- Phylum: Chordata
- Clade: Avemetatarsalia
- Clade: Avifilopluma; Gauthier & de Queiroz, 2001

Subgroups
- Ornithodira?: Dinosauria?; Coelurosauria; Also see text.

Synonyms
- Avipluma Clarke et al., 2004

= Avifilopluma =

Avifilopluma Temporal range: Middle Jurassic–Recent, 164–0 Ma

Clade including all feathered animals

Avifilopluma ("bird filoplumes") is a clade containing all animals with feathers. Unlike most clades, which are defined based on relative relationships, Avifilopluma is defined based on an apomorphy, that is, a unique physical characteristic shared by one group and not found outside that group (in this case, feathers). Its content is unclear, and has been speculated to range from Coelurosauria to all of Ornithodira.

== Definition ==
The clade Avifilopluma was created along with several other apomorphy-based clades relating to birds by Jacques Gauthier and Kevin de Queiroz in a 2001 paper. Their specific definition for the group was "the clade stemming from the first pan-avian with feathers homologous (synapomorphic) with those of Aves (Vultur gryphus Linnaeus 1758)."

The authors went on to define specifically what qualified as a "feather": Any filamentous structure arising from a follicle in the skin, with a hollow base, that shares common ancestry with the feathers of modern birds.

== Content ==
Gauthier and de Queiroz originally referred a number of prehistoric species to this group, on the basis of fossilized feather traces. These included what they considered to be non-avian dinosaurs such as Sinornithosaurus, Archaeopteryx, and the enantiornithines, all of which had true feathers. They tentatively considered the simpler feathers of other dinosaurs like Sinosauropteryx and Beipiaosaurus to be homologues of modern feathers and thus probably included in Avifilopluma. Therefore, they concluded that Avifilopluma would include most of the clade Maniraptora or Coelurosauria.

The authors went further, and speculated that pending more complete knowledge of dinosaur skin structures, even the most primitive theropods could turn out to be avifiloplumans. This idea gained tentative support with the discovery of Tianyulong, an ornithischian dinosaur with apparently hollow, filamentous feather-like fibers covering its body. This specimen was described by Zheng and colleagues in 2009, who noted definite similarities between the filaments of Tianyulong and coelurosaurian theropods, supporting the idea that all such structures were homologous with modern feathers, and pushing the origin of feathers back to the origin of dinosaurs or earlier. The discovery of Kulindadromeus supported the idea that feathers were already present in the last common ancestor of ornithischians and theropods, which was either the first dinosaur or the first ornithoscelidan depending on how ornithischians are related to other dinosaurs.

Some scientists have gone even further and suggested that the downy filaments present in pterosaurs are also feathers, and if this is the case, it would place the origin of feathers at or before the primitive split between dinosaurs and pterosaurs (Ornithodira).

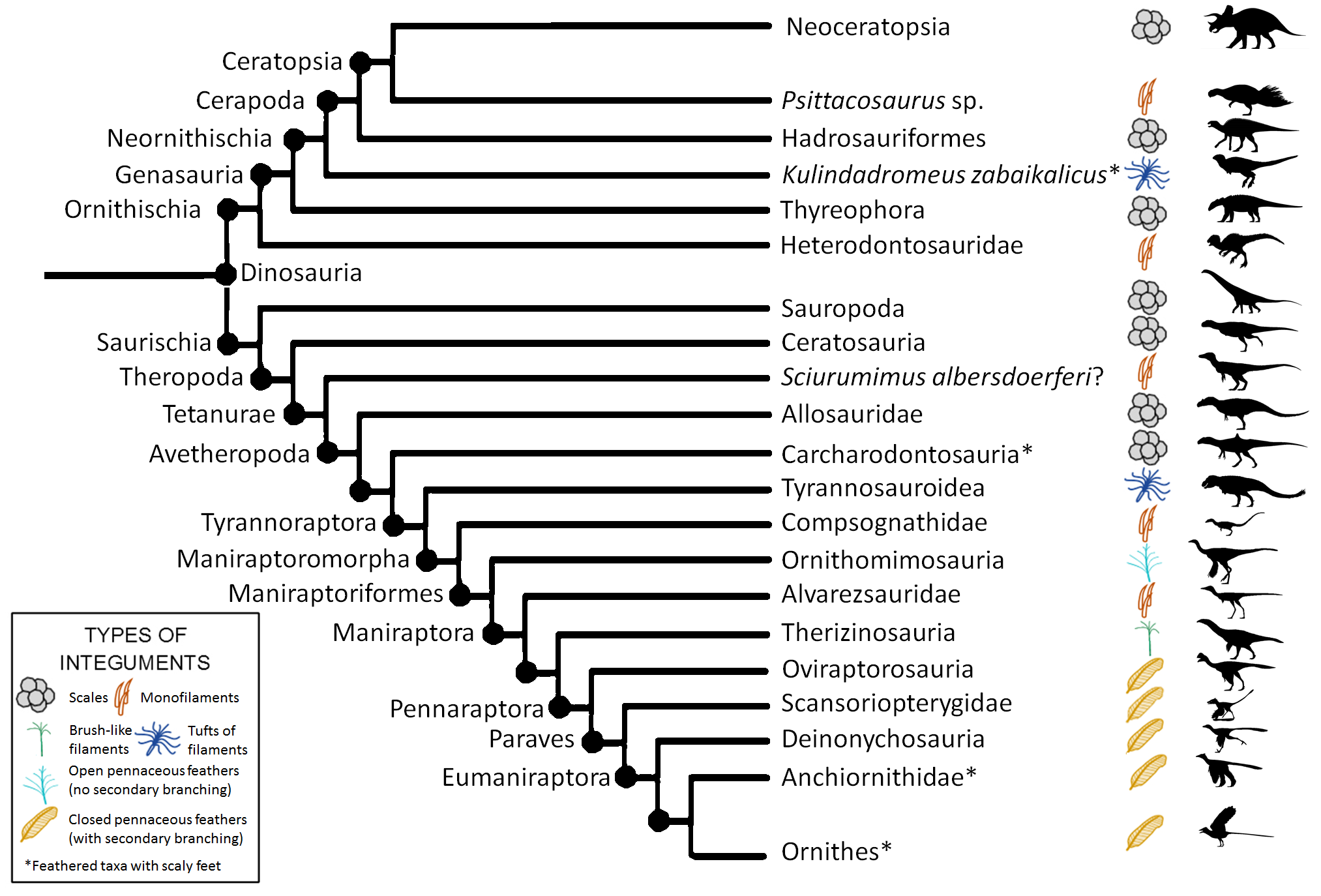
Distribution of feather types among dinosaurs according to Benton et al., 2019. The authors also consider pterosaurs feathered animals.

== See also ==
- Avialae
- Aviremigia
- Bird flight
- Feathered dinosaurs
