= Rhizalcyon =

Scientific classification
- Kingdom: Animalia
- Phylum: Cnidaria
- Subphylum: Anthozoa
- Class: Octocorallia
- Order: incertae sedis
- Genus: Rhizalcyon
- Species: R. rhodora

Binomial name
- Rhizalcyon rhodora Bayer, 1995

Genus of soft corals

Rhizalcyon is a monotypic genus of soft corals whose sole species is Rhizalcyon rhodora. Originally assigned to the family Alcyoniidae, it is of uncertain placement within the class Octocorallia.

== Taxonomy and etymology ==
The genus and its only species was formally described in 1995 by the marine biologist Frederick Bayer from syntypes that were collected in 1969 and 1977. Bayer placed the genus in Alcyoniidae, but the genus is incertae sedis within Octocorallia as of September 2026. The genus name Rhizalcyon is derived from the Greek words for "root" and "kingfisher". The specific name rhodora refers to the rhodora, a species of rhododendron, and is a reference to the color of the species.

== Description ==
Colonies of Rhizalcyon rhodora are pink and small, with the largest of the syntypes being 2.4 centimeters tall.

The shape of the colonies can vary significantly based on how large they are or how many polyps they have, but generally resemble a club and are joined to the substrate by a sheetlike holdfast. Smaller colonies with three to four polyps are collumnlike, with little to no difference in width between the stalk than the tip. Others have a pronounced club shape and have up to ten (perhaps more) polyps at an egg-shaped tip. In others still, the tip has few polyps (as little as three or four) and is connected to a long and narrow stalk that becomes wider as it approaches the tip. The holdfasts take a branching form like that of roots in colonies near Trinidad.

The tips of the polyps do not contain any sclerites, but the tissue in between polyps contain an abundance of spindles (rod-shaped sclerites with pointed ends) and crosses which are dotted with thorns and bumps.

== Habitat and distribution ==
Rhizalcyon rhodora is known from the Caribbean Sea, particularly in the waters near Aruba and east of Trinidad. It grows on pieces of broken coral and shells.

== Ecology ==
The colonies that were collected from Trinidad had pieces of indeterminate species of the soft coral genera Ellisella and Thelogorgia with them, and Bayer felt that the latter is likely Thelogorgia studeri.
