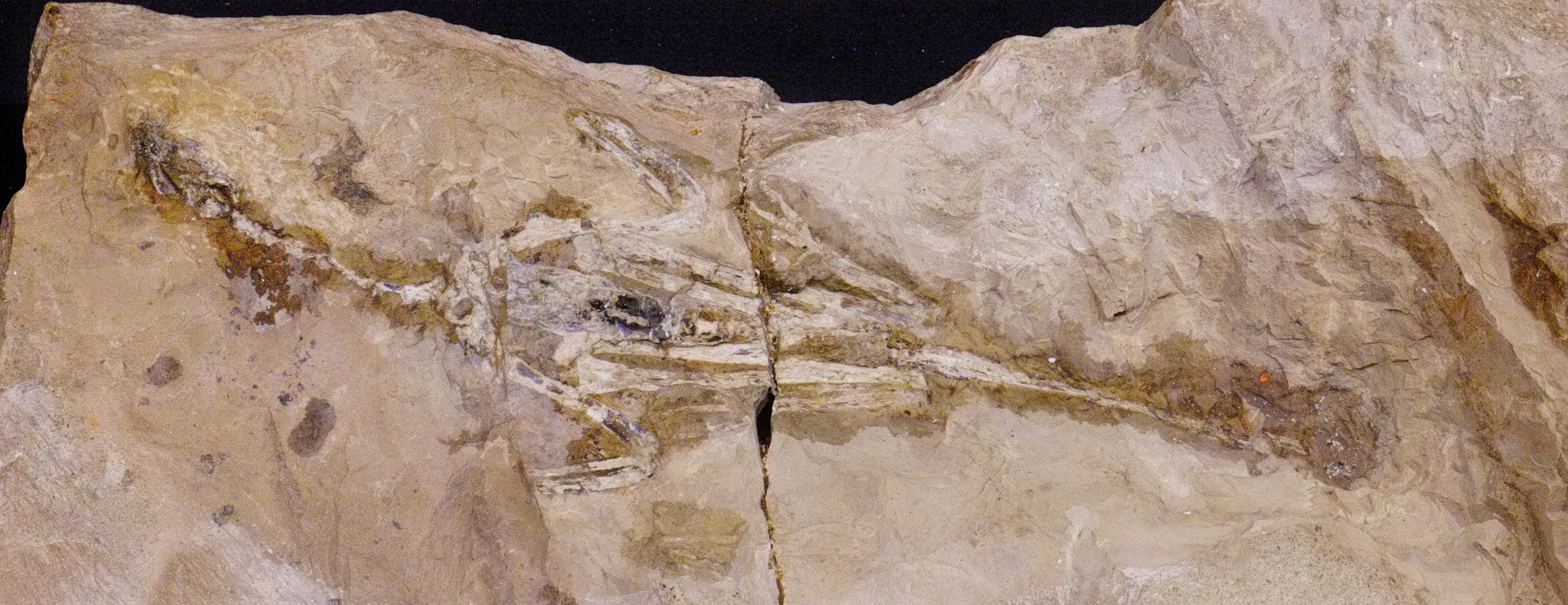
- Holotype specimen

Scientific classification
- Kingdom: Animalia
- Phylum: Chordata
- Class: Reptilia
- Clade: Dinosauria
- Clade: Saurischia
- Clade: Theropoda
- Clade: Avialae
- Clade: †Yandangithiformes; Cai & Zhao, 1999
- Family: †Yandangithidae; Cai & Zhao, 1999
- Genus: †Yandangornis; Cai & Zhao, 1999
- Species: †Y. longicaudus

Binomial name
- †Yandangornis longicaudus Cai & Zhao, 1999

= Yandangornis =

Yandangornis Temporal range: Late Cretaceous, 81.5 Ma

Extinct genus of dinosaurs

Yandangornis is a genus of theropods (possibly avialans) from the Late Cretaceous Tangshang Formation of China. It lived 81.5 million years ago in what is now China. The type species, Y. longicaudus, was formally described by Cai and Zhou in 1999.

== Discovery and naming ==
The holotype specimen is a mostly complete skeleton in the collection of the Zhejiang Museum of Natural History, with accession number M1326. The fossil was discovered in 1986, near Linhai City in Zhejiang Province, China. It includes most of one complete skeleton. The genus was named after the Yandang mountains.

== Description ==
The specimen is small, roughly the size of Archaeopteryx, with a total length around 58.8 centimetres (1.93 ft), of which 30.5 centimeters (1 foot) is tail. It is preserved in a seated position and visible from the ventral aspect. After Archaeopteryx, Yandangornis was the second genus of primitive bird found preserving a long, bony tail, and this trait was responsible for the specific name longicaudus, which is Latin for "long tail".

The skull is flattened, about 50 millimetres (2.0 in) long. It is lightly built and toothless, with a short mouth and robust premaxillae presumably possessing a horny beak. These characteristics are similar to those of Confuciusornis. The forelimbs, though incomplete, are generally similar to those of Archaeopteryx. The sternum is large and unkeeled, but possesses an expanded middle posterior portion and gastralia. The hind limbs are long and robust, particularly the femur and tibiotarsus. The fibula and tarsometatarsus, on the other hand, are short. The small first toe is at a higher level than the other three toes and does not possess a reversed hallux. The toes were long and slender, with short, blunt claws. Unlike in several other avialans and paravians, the second toe did not have a large, curved claw.

Yandangornis had some features that suggest a terrestrial mode of life, such as blunt toe claws, a non-reversed hallux of the first toe, and strong legs. This lifestyle may have evolved in response to the long, heavy tail of the genus, which would have inhibited flying ability.

== Classification ==
Cai and Zhao placed Yandangornis in a monotypic family (Yandangithidae) and order (Yandangithiformes) in the subclass Sauriurae of the class Aves. In fact, they considered that it was a direct descendant of Archaeopteryx, albeit as part of a lineage of long-tailed terrestrial birds distinct from modern birds. However, Sauriurae (long-tailed birds) has generally been discredited as an invalid paraphyletic group. Aves, on the other hand, is currently restricted to the last common ancestor of all living birds and its descendants. As Yandangornis was far more primitive than members of Aves, it is not considered a member of that class using recent definitions. The usage of Aves within the description of Yandangornis more closely resembles the current clade Avialae, which is defined as all animals more closely related to modern birds (Aves) than to Troodontids and Dromaeosaurids. Other long-tailed avialans include Jeholornis and Archaeopteryx.

Zhou and Zhang, 2007, briefly noted that Yandangornis's affinities were not sufficiently diagnosed, and that Yandangornis may potentially be a non-avialan genus of theropod. Yandangornis is poorly documented in literature, and discussion of the genus has generally been omitted from recent reevaluations of avialan systematics.
