= J. orientalis =

J. orientalis may refer to:

- Jaculus orientalis, the greater Egyptian jerboa, a rodent species found in North Africa
- Jixiangornis orientalis, a basal bird species from the Early Cretaceous

== See also ==
- Orientalis (disambiguation)
