= Neimengornis =

Neimengornis Temporal range: Aptian

Scientific classification
- Kingdom: Animalia
- Phylum: Chordata
- Class: Reptilia
- Clade: Dinosauria
- Clade: Saurischia
- Clade: Theropoda
- Clade: Avialae
- Order: †Jeholornithiformes
- Genus: †Neimengornis; Wang et al., 2021
- Species: †N. rectusmim

Binomial name
- †Neimengornis rectusmim Wang et al., 2021

Extinct genus of dinosaurs

Neimengornis (meaning "Inner Mongolia bird") is an extinct genus of jeholornithiform avialan dinosaurs that lived in what is now China during the Early Cretaceous. It contains one species, N. rectusmim, which is known from a single specimen, holotype IMMNH-PV00122, discovered in the Jiufotang Formation of Liaoning.

== Etymology ==
The generic name refers to the Inner Mongolia Natural History Museum where the holotype is stored, and the specific name means "straight minor metacarpal", combining the Latin rectus, meaning "straight", while "mim" is shortened from "minor metacarpal", referring to the uniquely straight minor metacarpals, different from other Jehol birds.
