= Ctenocella =

Scientific classification
- Kingdom: Animalia
- Phylum: Cnidaria
- Subphylum: Anthozoa
- Class: Octocorallia
- Order: Scleralcyonacea
- Family: Ellisellidae
- Genus: Ctenocella; Valenciennes, 1855

Genus of cnidarians

Ctenocella is a genus of coral that was first described by Achille Valenciennes in 1855.

== Description ==
Its colony's structure has twigs that are vertically upright from the upper sides of the branches. The spicules are warty double clubs.

== Diversity ==
The following species are assigned to this genus:

- Ctenocella lyra Toeplitz, 1919
- Ctenocella ochracea (Studer, 1890)
- Ctenocella pectinata (Pallas, 1766)
- Ctenocella ramosa (Simpson, 1910)
