= Tangshang Formation =

Geologic formation in China

- Stratigraphic range: ~92.9–81.5 Ma
- Type: Geological formation

Location
- Country: China

The Tangshang Formation is a Late Cretaceous Mesozoic geologic formation in China. Dinosaur and pterosaur remains diagnostic to the genus level are among the fossils that have been recovered from the formation. The formation has been dated around 92.9 million to 81.5 million years ago.

== Paleobiota of the Tangshang Formation ==
Color key: Taxon / Reclassified taxon / Taxon falsely reported as present / Dubious taxon or junior synonym / Ichnotaxon / Ootaxon / Morphotaxon	Notes; Uncertain or tentative taxa are in small text; ~~crossed out~~ taxa are discredited.

Genus	Species	Location	Stratigraphic Position	Material	Notes	Images
"Chilantaisaurus"	"C". zheziangensis	Zhejiang	"Second member of the Fangyan Formation"	"Partial left tibia with pes."	A therizinosauroid. Originally identified as a distinct species of Chilantaisaurus.	
Yandangornis	Y. longicaudus	Aolicun		"Nearly complete skeleton."	An avialan.	
Zhejiangopterus	Z. linhaiensis	Aolicun		"Skulls and skeletons of multiple specimens."	An azhdarchid.	

== See also ==
- List of dinosaur-bearing rock formations
  - List of stratigraphic units with few dinosaur genera
