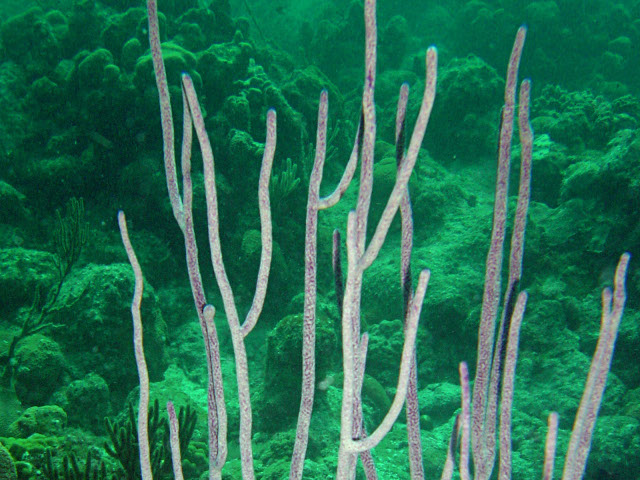
- Ellisella elongata

Scientific classification
- Kingdom: Animalia
- Phylum: Cnidaria
- Subphylum: Anthozoa
- Class: Octocorallia
- Order: Scleralcyonacea
- Family: Ellisellidae
- Genus: Ellisella; J.E.Gray, 1858

= Ellisella =

Genus of corals

Ellisella, commonly known as sea whip, is a genus of soft coral in the family Ellisellidae.

Ellisella constitutes like bushy shrub gorgonians which dominant color is brown to reddish and polyps are white with eight tentacles.

Branches are more or less long according to the species, however, very few ramifications are observed in the genus.

== Species list ==
The following species are recognized within the genus Ellisella:

- Ellisella acacesia Grasshoff, 1999
- Ellisella andamanensis (Simpson, 1910)
- Ellisella atlantica (Toeplitz in Kükenthal, 1919)
- Ellisella aurantiaca (Thomson & Henderson, 1905)
- Ellisella azilia Grasshoff, 1999
- Ellisella candida (Ridley, 1882)
- Ellisella ceratophyta (Linnaeus, 1758)
- Ellisella cercidia Grasshoff, 1999
- Ellisella ceylonensis (Simpson, 1910)
- Ellisella cylindrica (Toeplitz in Kükenthal, 1919)
- Ellisella divisa (Thomson & Henderson, 1905)
- Ellisella dollfusi (Stiasny, 1938)
- Ellisella elongata (Pallas, 1766)
- Ellisella eustala Grasshoff, 1999
- Ellisella filiformis (Toeplitz in Kükenthal, 1919)
- Ellisella flava Nutting, 1910
- Ellisella funiculina (Duchassaing & Michelotti, 1864)
- Ellisella gracilis (Wright & Studer, 1889)
- Ellisella grandiflora (Deichmann, 1936)
- Ellisella grandis (Verrill, 1901)
- Ellisella laevis (Verrill, 1865)
- Ellisella limbaughi Bayer, 1960
- Ellisella maculata Studer, 1878
- Ellisella marisrubri (Stiasny, 1938)
- Ellisella moniliformis (Lamarck, 1815)
- Ellisella nivea (Bayer & Grasshoff, 1995)
- Ellisella nuctenea Grasshoff, 1999
- Ellisella paraplexauroides Stiasny, 1936
- Ellisella plexauroides Toeplitz in Kükenthal, 1919
- Ellisella quadrilineata (Simpson, 1910)
- Ellisella rigida (Toeplitz in Kükenthal, 1919)
- Ellisella rosea (Bayer & Grasshoff, 1995)
- Ellisella rossafila Grasshoff, 1999
- Ellisella rubra (Wright & Studer, 1889)
- Ellisella schmitti (Bayer, 1961)
- Ellisella thomsoni (Simpson, 1910)
- Ellisella vaughani Stiasny, 1940
