= Pseudogorgia =

Scientific classification
- Domain: Eukaryota
- Kingdom: Animalia
- Phylum: Cnidaria
- Subphylum: Anthozoa
- Class: Octocorallia
- Order: incertae sedis
- Family: Pseudogorgiidae
- Genus: Pseudogorgia; Kölliker, 1870
- Species: P. godeffroyi

Binomial name
- Pseudogorgia godeffroyi Kölliker, 1870

Genus of corals

Pseudogorgia is a monotypic genus of corals belonging to the monotypic family Pseudogorgiidae. The only species is Pseudogorgia godeffroyi.

The species is found in Southern Australia.
