= Cretaaviculus =

Cretaaviculus Temporal range: Late Cretaceous

Scientific classification
- Kingdom: Animalia
- Phylum: Chordata
- Class: Reptilia
- Clade: Dinosauria
- Clade: Saurischia
- Clade: Theropoda
- Clade: Avialae
- Genus: †Cretaaviculus; Bazhanov, 1969
- Species: †C. sarysuensis

Binomial name
- †Cretaaviculus sarysuensis Bazhanov, 1969

Extinct genus of birds

Cretaaviculus is an extinct genus of birds from the Upper Cretaceous Bostobe Formation of Kazakhstan. The type species, C. sarysuensis, is known only from an isolated, asymmetrical contour feather.
