= Zhongornis =

Zhongornis Temporal range: Early Cretaceous, 122 Ma

Scientific classification
- Kingdom: Animalia
- Phylum: Chordata
- Class: Reptilia
- Clade: Dinosauria
- Clade: Saurischia
- Clade: Theropoda
- Clade: Avialae
- Genus: †Zhongornis; Gao et al., 2008
- Species: †Z. haoae

Binomial name
- †Zhongornis haoae Gao et al., 2008

Extinct genus of dinosaurs

Zhongornis (meaning "intermediate bird") is a genus of primitive maniraptoran dinosaurs that lived during the Early Cretaceous. It was found in rocks of the Yixian Formation in Lingyuan City (China), and described by Gao et al. in 2008.

Zhongornis has only one described species, Zhongornis haoae. The only specimen is a fossil slab and counterslab numbered D2455/6. It is in the collection of the Dalian Natural History Museum. It is a fairly complete skeleton about eight centimeters in length. Pores in the bones and unfused sutures in the skeleton indicate that the specimen was a juvenile, but the authors believe that it was developed enough to erect a new taxon on the basis of its unique morphological characters. There are feather impressions preserved on the right hand and also probable tail feathers preserved near the left foot. Zhongornis had a beaked mouth with no teeth. The tail is proportionately short, has thirteen vertebrae, and no pygostyle. The third finger has only two phalangeal bones, unlike non-avian dinosaurs and Confuciusornis, and more like Enantiornithes and more advanced avialans. These features and a cladistic analysis indicate that Zhongornis is the sister group to all pygostylia, meaning that it is intermediate between long-tailed Avialae, like Archaeopteryx, and more advanced taxa, like Confuciusornis.

== Evolutionary significance ==
Zhongornis provides important anatomical information about the evolutionary transition from primitive basal Avialae like Archaeopteryx, which had a long bony tail and a dinosaur-like third finger, to the more advanced avialans like the Enantiornithes, which had reduced third fingers and tails fused into rigid pygostyles. Zhonghornis is the only fossil ever found that seems to be intermediate in these features. It appears to have one less bone in the third finger than Archaeopteryx, and one more than Longipteryx, suggesting that it is an intermediate between the two. Zhongornis also seems to be intermediate in its tail anatomy. It has only thirteen caudal vertebrae, far less than the 22 in Archaeopteryx. None of the vertebral centra are fused, but the last four do form a continuous lateral flange, implying that this specimen had an incipient pygostyle. Previous to this fossil Sanz et al. (1992) suggested that the evolution of the pygostyle may have proceeded as the numerous vertebrae of the tail became very small and highly ankylosed. Zhongornis suggests that shortening of the tail, and a large reduction in the number of vertebrae, preceded the origin of the pygostyle in the evolution of at least one bird language.

== Other interpretations ==
After a detailed restudy, O'Connor and Sullivan suggest that this juvenile bird from the Early Cretaceous Jehol fauna of China actually possesses 20, rather than 14, tail vertebrae; further, this tail is very similar to those of Epidexipteryx (a scansoriopterygid) and Caudipteryx (an oviraptorosaur). Based on this and other features, the authors reinterpreted Zhongornis as the sister taxon of scansoriopterygids, and further suggested that this clade (Zhongornis + Scansoriopterygidae) is the sister group of Oviraptorosauria. Other phylogenetic analyses, including a larger dataset, don't consider the hypothesis that Zhongornis is a scansoriopterygid, instead finding it in its traditional position as a primitive relative of pygostylians, or as a close relative of Confuciusornis. Some researchers consider the scansoriopterygid hypothesis invalid, as they believe Zhongornis strongly differs from this group in many traits, traits that it also shares with birds.
