= Inflatocalyx =

Scientific classification
- Kingdom: Animalia
- Phylum: Cnidaria
- Subphylum: Anthozoa
- Class: Octocorallia
- Order: incertae sedis
- Genus: Inflatocalyx; Verseveldt & Bayer, 1988
- Species: I. infirmata

Binomial name
- Inflatocalyx infirmata Verseveldt & Bayer, 1988

Genus of Cnidarian

Inflatocalyx is a genus of soft coral in the Alcyoniidae family. The genus contains the single species Inflatocalyx infirmata, and was described by Verseveldt & Bayer in 1988. The coral is found in the Arctic Ocean.
