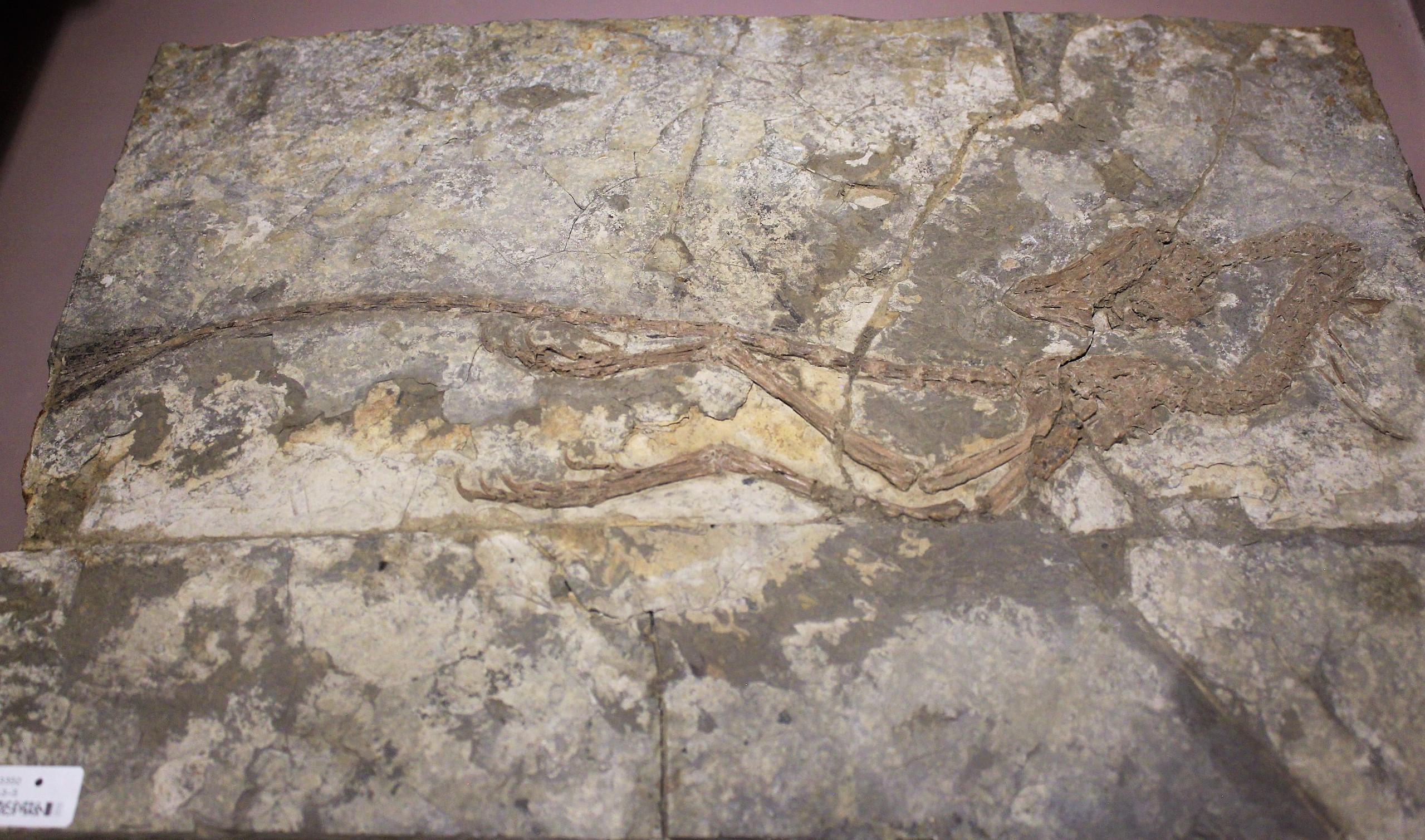
- Fossil specimen of a juvenile J. prima (IVPP V13550), Paleozoological Museum of China

Scientific classification
- Kingdom: Animalia
- Phylum: Chordata
- Class: Reptilia
- Clade: Dinosauria
- Clade: Saurischia
- Clade: Theropoda
- Clade: Avialae
- Order: †Jeholornithiformes; Zhou & Zhang, 2006
- Family: †Jeholornithidae; Zhou & Zhang, 2006

Type species
- †Jeholornis prima Zhou & Zhang, 2002

Genera
- †Dalianraptor?; †Jeholornis; †Jixiangornis?; †Kompsornis; †Neimengornis; †Shenzhouraptor?

= Jeholornithidae =

Jeholornithids Temporal range: Early Cretaceous, 124.5–120 Ma

Extinct family of dinosaurs

Jeholornithidae is a family of avialan theropods whose taxonomy is controversial, whose remains are found in fossil deposits of what is now China. The controversy stems from whether most of the taxa in the group are just specimens of Jeholornis, as well as if the group is monophyletic at all. In the description of Kompsornis the authors Wang et al. (2020) found moderate support in the monophyly of the group, placing them as basal avialans and sister to Pygostylia. No phylogenetic definitions for these groups were provided by Zhou and Zhang, but a topological definition was provided in 2020 by Wang and colleagues where Jeholornithiformes was defined as "the most inclusive clade containing Je. prima but excluding the extant birds".

The results of a phylogenetic analysis of all valid jeholornithiform species considered by Wang and colleagues is shown below:

- Avialae
  - Archaeopteryx lithographica
  - - Archaeopteryx albersdoerferi
    - - Alcmonavis
      - - Jeholornithiformes
          - Jixiangornis
          - - Jeholornis palmapenis
            - Shenzhouraptor sinensis
            - - Kompsornis
              - - Jeholornis prima
                - Jeholornis curvipes
        - Pygostylia
