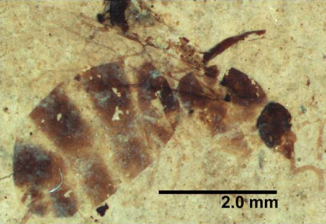
- Proiridomyrmex rotundatus

Scientific classification
- Kingdom: Animalia
- Phylum: Arthropoda
- Class: Insecta
- Order: Hymenoptera
- Family: Formicidae
- Subfamily: Dolichoderinae
- Tribe: incertae sedis
- Genus: †Proiridomyrmex; Dlussky & Rasnitsyn, 2002

Type species
- Proiridomyrmex vetulusa Dlussky & Rasnitsyn, 2003, 1862

Diversity
- 2 species

= Proiridomyrmex =

Proiridomyrmex Temporal range: Eocene, 51–46 Ma

Genus of ants

Proiridomyrmex is an extinct genus of ants in the subfamily Dolichoderinae. The genus contains two species; Proiridomyrmex vetulus, described in 2002 where its fossils were discovered in the United States, and Proiridomyrmex rotundatus, described in 2015.
