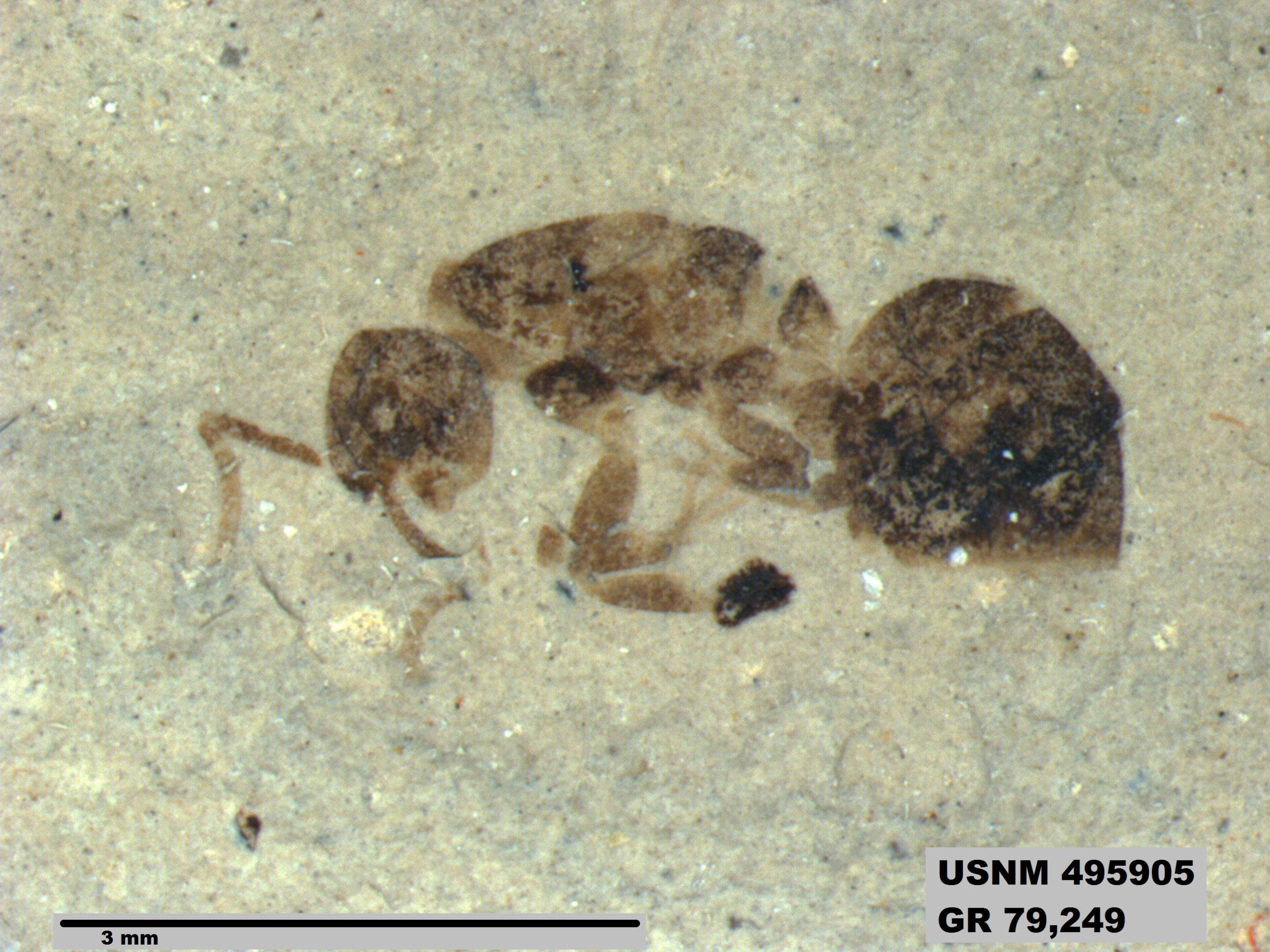
- Holotype female USNM PAL 495905

Scientific classification
- Domain: Eukaryota
- Kingdom: Animalia
- Phylum: Arthropoda
- Class: Insecta
- Order: Hymenoptera
- Family: Formicidae
- Subfamily: Dolichoderinae
- Genus: Dolichoderus
- Species: †D. kohlsi

Binomial name
- †Dolichoderus kohlsi Dlussky & Rasnitsyn, 2002

= Dolichoderus kohlsi =

Dolichoderus kohlsi Temporal range: Wasatchian

Species of ant

Dolichoderus kohlsi is an extinct species of Early Eocene of ant in the genus Dolichoderus. Described by Dlussky and Rasnitsyn in 2002, the fossils were discovered in the United States.
