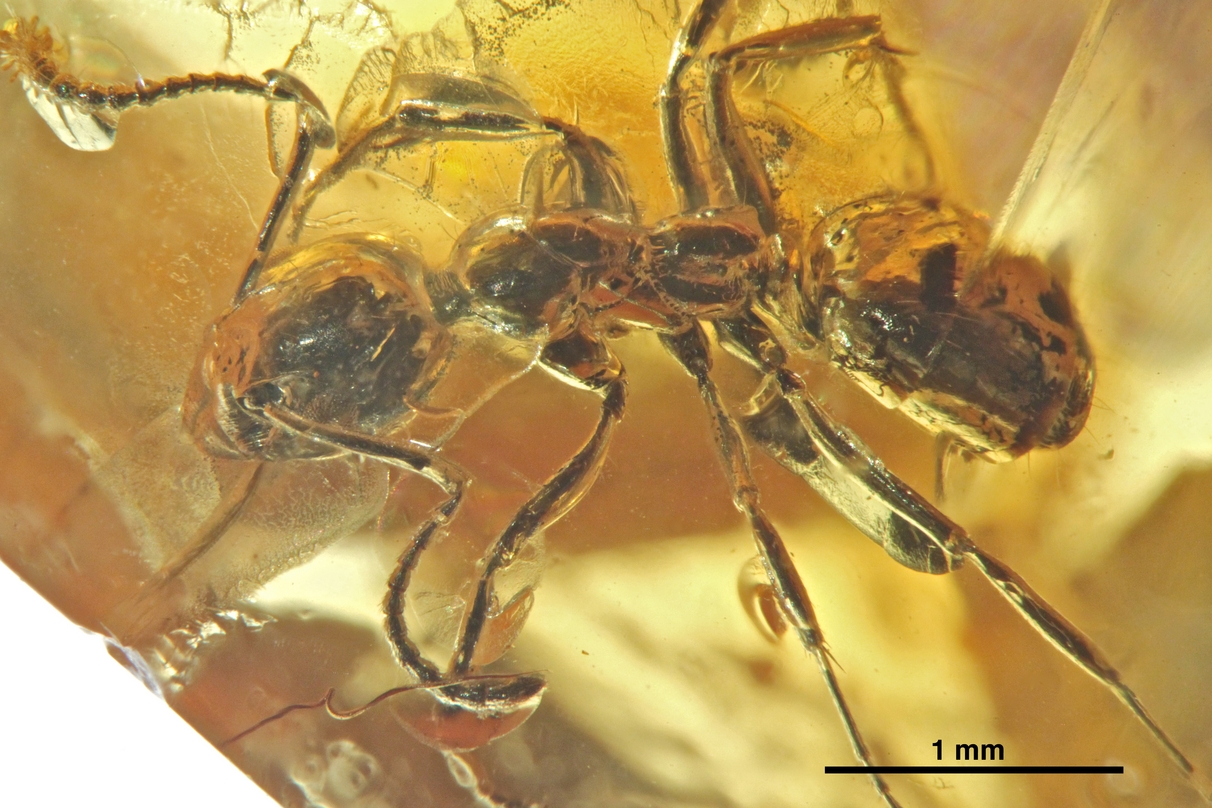
- Worker in Baltic amber

Scientific classification
- Domain: Eukaryota
- Kingdom: Animalia
- Phylum: Arthropoda
- Class: Insecta
- Order: Hymenoptera
- Family: Formicidae
- Subfamily: Dolichoderinae
- Genus: Dolichoderus
- Species: †D. longipilosus

Binomial name
- †Dolichoderus longipilosus Dlussky, 2002

= Dolichoderus longipilosus =

Dolichoderus longipilosus Temporal range: Middle to Late Eocene

Species of ant

Dolichoderus longipilosus is an extinct species of Eocene ant in the genus Dolichoderus. It was described by Dlussky in 2002, and the fossils of the species are only known from a fossilised worker that was found in the Baltic amber.
