= Lanthanocephalus =

Lanthanocephalus clandestinus

Scientific classification
- Kingdom: Animalia
- Phylum: Cnidaria
- Subphylum: Anthozoa
- Class: Octocorallia
- Order: incertae sedis
- Genus: Lanthanocephalus; Williams & Starmer, 2000
- Species: L. clandestinus

Binomial name
- Lanthanocephalus clandestinus Williams & Starmer, 2000

Genus of corals

Lanthanocephalus is a monotypic genus of coral in the subclassis Octocorallia. Lanthanocephalus clandestinus is the only species described, and is endemic to South Africa.
