= Neotrirachodon =

Neotrirachodon Temporal range: Anisian ~247–242 Ma

Scientific classification
- Kingdom: Animalia
- Phylum: Chordata
- Clade: Synapsida
- Clade: Therapsida
- Clade: †Therocephalia
- Superfamily: †Baurioidea
- Family: †Bauriidae (?)
- Genus: †Neotrirachodon; Tatarinov, 2002
- Species: †N. expectatus

Binomial name
- †Neotrirachodon expectatus Tatarinov, 2002

Synonyms
- Antecosuchus ochevi Tatarinov, 1973 (in part)

Extinct genus of therapsids

Neotrirachodon is an extinct genus of therapsids which existed in Russia during the Middle Triassic period. Its type and only species is Neotrirachodon expectatus.

It is known from a jaw fossil consisting of the left dentary with postcanines. It was recovered from the Donguz Formation, Orenburg Oblast of Russia. The fossil was first described as belonging to the genus Antecosuchus (as Antecosuchus ochevi), but in 2002 it was placed in its own monotypic genus.

It has tentatively been classified as a trirachodontid gomphodont pending further fossil discoveries. Gomphodonts were a group of herbivorous cynodonts which lived during the Triassic. If correct, it would be the first trirachodontid described from Russia.

Its classification remains uncertain, however. Other studies treat it as an incertae sedis gomphodont, while others propose that it is more likely to be a bauriid therocephalian rather than a trirachodontid.
