= Dalianraptor =

Dalianraptor Temporal range: Early Cretaceous, 120 Ma

Scientific classification
- Kingdom: Animalia
- Phylum: Chordata
- Class: Reptilia
- Clade: Dinosauria
- Clade: Saurischia
- Clade: Theropoda
- Clade: Paraves
- Clade: Avialae
- Genus: †Dalianraptor; Gao & Liu, 2005
- Species: †D. cuhe

Binomial name
- †Dalianraptor cuhe Gao & Liu, 2005

Extinct genus of dinosaurs

Dalianraptor (meaning "Dalian thief") is a dubious, possibly chimeric, genus of theropod dinosaurs from the Jiufotang Formation of China, dating to the Early Cretaceous. It was initially believed to have been a possible dromaeosaurid before it was described in 2005.

== Discovery and naming ==
The holotype, D2139, was discovered sometime before the 2000s, when Matthew Martyniuk saw a photograph of the holotype, which was then labelled as an undescribed possible dromaeosaurid. The type, and only known species, D. cuhe, was named and described by Gao & Liu in 2005.

More recently, it is being suspected that the specimen is a chimera forged for the fossil trade, namely a Jeholornis with the arms exchanged by those of an unnamed flightless theropod. If the holotype is not a chimera, then the phylogenetic placement of Dalianraptor is still uncertain.

== Description ==
Dalianraptor is very similar to the contemporary avialian Jeholornis, though it has a longer digit I (thumb-equivalent) and shorter forelimbs, which suggests it may have been flightless. It also reached about 80 centimetres (31 in) in length.
