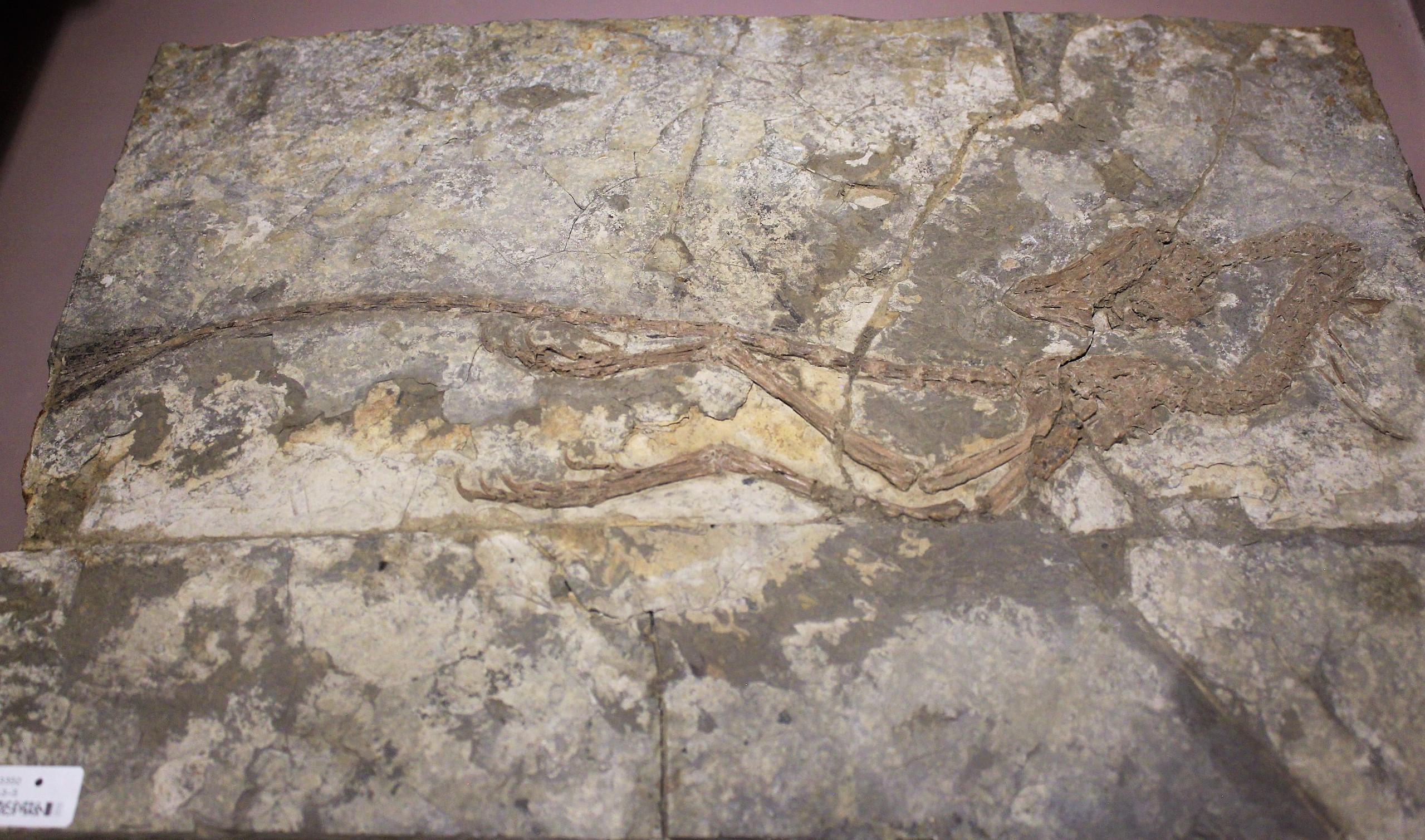
- Fossil specimen of a juvenile J. prima (IVPP V13550), Paleozoological Museum of China

Scientific classification
- Kingdom: Animalia
- Phylum: Chordata
- Class: Reptilia
- Clade: Dinosauria
- Clade: Saurischia
- Clade: Theropoda
- Clade: Avialae
- Order: †Jeholornithiformes
- Family: †Jeholornithidae
- Genus: †Jeholornis; Zhou & Zhang, 2002

Type species
- †Jeholornis prima Zhou & Zhang, 2002

Other species
- †J. palmapenis O'Connor et al., 2012; †J. curvipes Lefèvre et al., 2014

Synonyms
- Dalianraptor? Gao & Liu, 2005; Shenzhouraptor? Ji et al., 2002

= Jeholornis =

Jeholornis Temporal range: Early Cretaceous, 122–120 Ma

Extinct genus of dinosaurs

Jeholornis (meaning "Jehol bird") is a genus of avialan dinosaurs that lived between approximately 122 and 120 million years ago during the early Cretaceous Period in China. Fossil Jeholornis were first discovered in the Jiufotang Formation in Hebei Province, China (in what was previously Rehe Province, also known as Jehol—hence the name) and additional specimens have been found in the older Yixian Formation.

Jeholornis had long tails and few small teeth, and were approximately the size of turkeys, making them among the largest avialans known until the Late Cretaceous. Their diet included seeds of cycads, Ginkgo or similar plants.

== Description ==
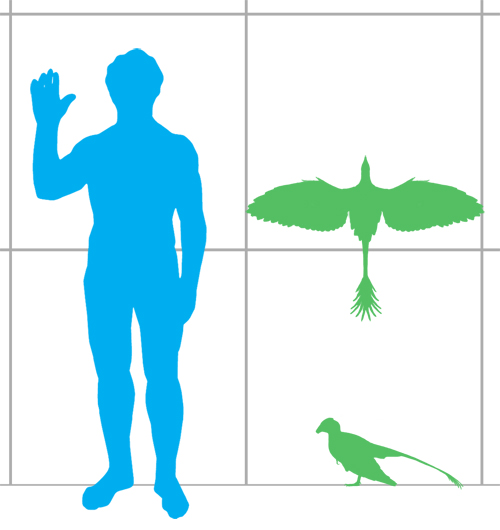
Jeholornis size compared to a modern human.

Jeholornis were relatively large, basal avialans, with a maximum adult length of up to 75 cm (2.5 ft) and an estimated weight of 2.27-9.1 kg (5-20 lbs). Another estimation listed it at 85 cm (2.6 ft) and 780 gr (1.72 lbs). Their skulls were short and high, similar to basal paravians like Epidexipteryx and to early oviraptorosaurs like Incisivosaurus. The lower jaws were short, stout, and curved downward, possibly an adaptation for eating seeds. Jeholornis prima lacked teeth in their upper jaws, and had only three small teeth in their lower jaws, while J. palmapenis had a few teeth in the middle of the upper jaw (maxilla) but none in the front (premaxilla). The upper teeth of J. palmapenis seem to have been angled slightly forward as in some other basal avialans. The teeth in all three species were small, blunt and peg-like with no serrations.

Their arms were robust and longer than the legs, with relatively well-developed shoulder girdles indicating strong wing musculature. The wishbone (furcula) was U-shaped in J. prima and J. palmapenis but not in J. curvipes. Their fingers were short compared to those of Archaeopteryx and also more robust. The lower legs were not particularly long, indicating that these animals were not specialized runners. The first toe, or hallux, which is reversed in modern birds and used to perch in trees, was only partially reversed in both Jeholornis species, pointing inward and slightly backward. The halluces of Jeholornis were short, but their claw was more strongly curved than those of the other toes. Unlike deinonychosaurs and some other Mesozoic avialans, the claw of the second toe was not enlarged relative to the other claws. Their tail anatomy was more like those of dromaeosaurids than Archaeopteryx, with more strongly interlocking vertebrae, and though they had a similar number of tail vertebrae (between 20 and 24) those of Jeholornis were much longer overall than those of Archaeopteryx. The only well-preserved tail feathers come from the type specimen of J. palmapenis.

A study by Gregory M. Erickson in 2009 has shown that Jeholornis (along with Archaeopteryx) had relatively slow ontogenic development, i.e. they grew very slowly, compared to most modern birds, which grow very quickly. The living kiwi birds, however, have slow development, and it has been speculated that Jeholornis could have had a metabolism similar to these.

=== Feathers ===
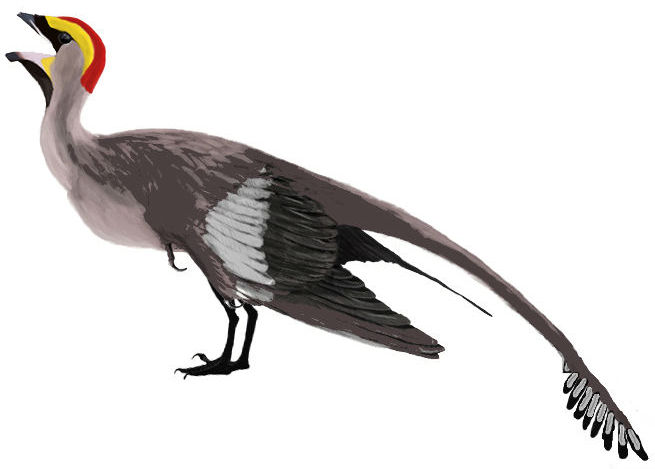
Restoration of Jeholornis

Feather traces from the wing have only been identified in two specimens, LPM 0193 (J. prima) and (SDM 20090109.1 (J. palmapenis). The first specimen shows that the flight feathers were asymmetrical (and therefore aerodynamic, as in modern flying birds) and up to 21 centimeters long, longer than the forearm and hand combined. The exact number of flight feathers cannot be determined from known specimens, however, as the preservation is too poor.

The tails of several specimens preserve a fan of feathers (rectrices) at the tip, shorter than those on the forelimbs. The feather fan is similar to those of Microraptor and Caudipteryx, being restricted to the tip of the tail, unlike those of Archaeopteryx and Similicaudipteryx which have rectrices extending down much of the tail length. In at least one species, Jeholornis palmapenis, there were 11 tail feathers. The feathers were short and pointed, and arched away from the body of the tail, so that the entire array of tail feathers resembled a palm frond. The tail feathers did not overlap, and so could not have formed a lift-generating surface, so the tail was probably used mainly for display.

== Classification ==
Jeholornis contains at least three species: the type species, Jeholornis prima (named in reference to the Jehol group of fossil beds where it was found, and the primitive appearance of the tail) and two referred species, Jeholornis palmapenis described by Jingmai O'Connor and colleagues in 2012, and Jeholornis curvipes, described by Ulysse Lefèvre and colleagues in 2014. The name J. palmapenis translates to "palm tail" in reference to the unusual arrangement of its tail feathers, while the name J. curvipes means "curved foot" due to a distinctive bend in the bones just above the ankle (metatarsus).

Zhonghe Zhou and Fucheng Zhang classified Jeholornis in a new family, Jeholornithidae, of which it is the type genus, and the order Jeholornithiformes. No phylogenetic definitions for these groups were provided by Zhou and Zhang, but a topological definition was provided in 2020 by Wang and colleagues where Jeholornithiformes was defined as "the most inclusive clade containing Je. prima but excluding the extant birds".

The results of a phylogenetic analysis of all valid jeholornithiform species considered by Wang and colleagues is shown below:

- Avialae
  - Archaeopteryx lithographica
  - - Archaeopteryx albersdoerferi
    - - Alcmonavis
      - - Jeholornithiformes
          - Jixiangornis
          - - Jeholornis palmapenis
            - Shenzhouraptor sinensis
            - - Kompsornis
              - - Jeholornis prima
                - Jeholornis curvipes
        - Pygostylia

=== Specimens ===
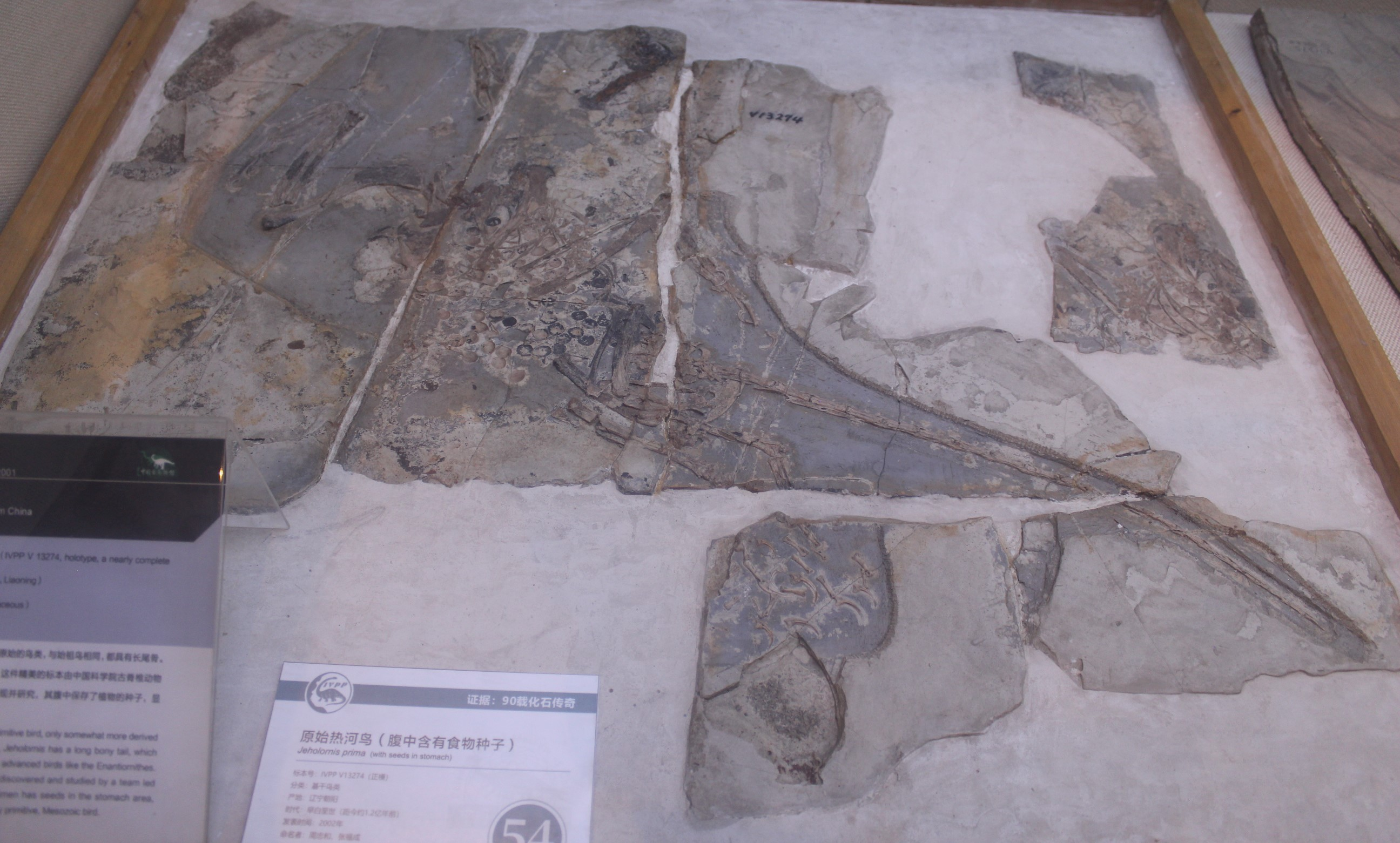
Holotype (IVPP V13274) of J. prima, Paleozoological Museum of China

Over 100 specimens of Jeholornis have been found, though only seven have been formally described. The type specimen is in the collection of the Institute of Vertebrate Paleontology and Paleoanthropology in Beijing. It is cataloged as IVPP V13274, and was reported in the journal Nature in 2002. A second specimen is in the collection of the Liaoning Provincial Museum of Paleontology, and is catalogued as LPM 0193 it was reported as a new species, Shenzhouraptor sinensis, in the journal The Geological Bulletin of China in 2002, but is likely a junior synonym of Jeholornis prima. Two more specimens were later accessioned by the IVPP as V13550 and V13553 and they were reported in the journal Naturwissenschaften in 2003. A fifth specimen, SDM 20090109, was described in 2012 and made the type specimen of the species J. palmapenis. A sixth specimen, STM2-51, was reported in 2013 and preserved round structures in the body cavity which were interpreted as ovaries. A seventh specimen, YFGP-yb2, was described in 2014 and made the type specimen of a third species, J. curvipes.

The non-pygostylian avialan Jixiangornis orientalis was considered a possible synonym of Jeholornis prima. However, a phylogenetic analysis performed in 2014 found that it may actually be more closely related to short-tailed avialans (Pygostylia) than to Jeholornis.

=== Naming dispute ===
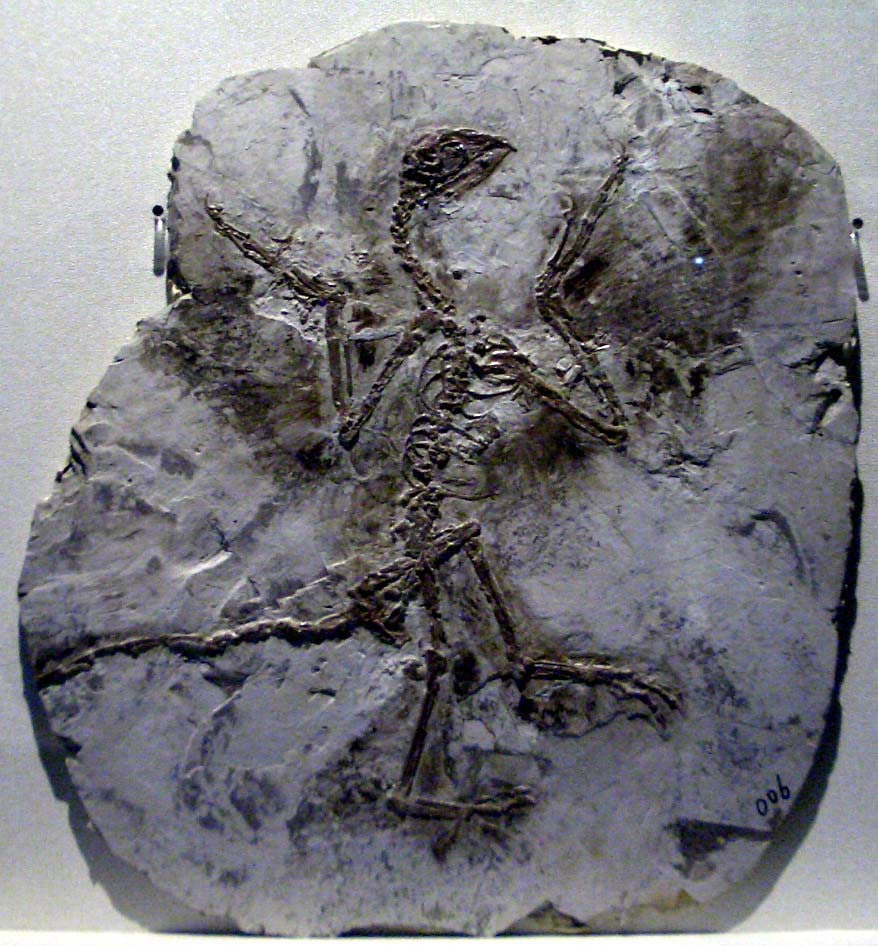
A specimen of Jeholornis formerly named as Shenzhouraptor sinensis.

Shenzhouraptor sinensis (the name of which is derived from "Shenzhou", an ancient name for China, and "raptor", Latin for "violent plunderer") was described in the July 2002 issue of Geological Bulletin of China by Ji et al., the same month as Jeholornis was described by Zhou and Zhang. Two of the diagnostic characteristics which could have distinguished Shenzhouraptor from Jeholornis were its smaller size and the absence of teeth, which may be attributed to age and preservational bias. The other major difference was a different number of caudal vertebrae, though Zhou and Zhang showed in 2003 that the specimen was missing several of the proximal caudals.

Several scientists have come to the conclusion that Jeholornis and Shenzhouraptor are specimens of the same species. However, both names were published in print within days of each other, and there was initially controversy over which name should be considered official. The date on the article describing Jeholornis was July 25, 2002. The discovery of Shenzhouraptor was reported in at least one newspaper on July 23, 2002, though the official paper naming the species, published in a monthly journal, did not bear a specific date of issue. In 2003, Ji and colleagues made Jeholornis a junior synonym of Shenzhouraptor. In 2006, Zhou and Zhang noted that the ICZN gives priority to these over monthly journals, and argued that because of this Jeholornis has priority over Shenzhouraptor. Most studies have since treated Jeholornis prima as the valid name for the species.

In 2020, a publication of a new genus and species of jeholornithiform, Kompsornis longicaudus, by Wang and colleagues included a re-evaluation of the diagnostic characteristics of all Jeholornis species, including the holotype of Shenzhouraptor. This examination concluded that Shenzhouraptor was a valid species distinct from Jeholornis prima and other jeholornithiforms, rejecting the suggestion that they are synonymous. A phylogenetic analysis supported this conclusion, recovering Shenzhouraptor as a less derived species outside of a clade composed of Jeholornis prima, J. curvipes and Kompsornis.

== Paleobiology ==
=== Diet ===
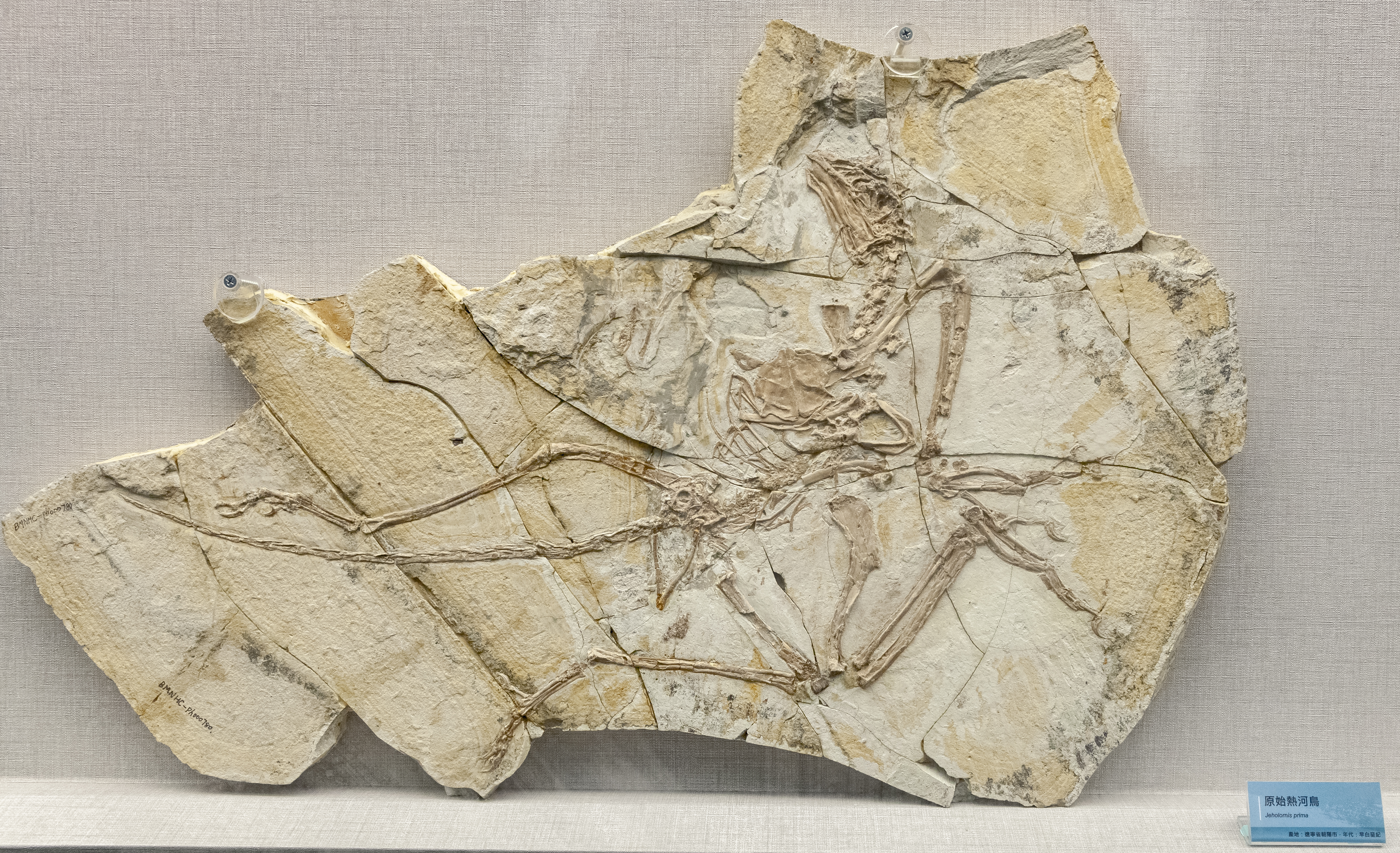
Fossil

The type fossil of Jeholornis prima preserved over 50 round seeds in the area of the crop, each about 8-10 millimeters wide. The seeds belong to the form genus Carpolithes, thus it is uncertain what exact lineage of plant they represent. This J. prima specimen, while about two times heavier than the type specimen Shenzhouraptor, had three small teeth in the lower jaw, whereas no teeth were visible in the latter. Two other specimens, IVPP V13353 and the aforementioned V13550 are smaller still and most certainly immature individuals; they both have teeth. In the Shenzhouraptor type, the dentary and anterior skull are poorly preserved and this makes it impossible to say whether there were any teeth. The jaw is deep, the dentaries are well fused, and the teeth are reduced, and all indicate a specialized seed-feeding habit for Jeholornis. In 2017 it was announced, that one specimen was fossilized with gastroliths in its stomach. A 2022 study by the University of Oxford, england and Linyi University showed that Jeholornis prima was the earliest known fruit eating bird. This trait possibly developed when plants somewhere around 135 million years ago started developing new kinds of fruits. Some birds like Jeholornis evolved the ability to eat the fruits and a co-evolutionary relationship started about 120 million years ago. During this study, they also found that Jeholornis was not just eating the seeds but the entire fruit itself. It would have defecated un-crushed seeds helping the plant spread and grow into more fruit producing plants providing more food scorces for Jeholornis.

=== Flight and perching ability ===
The shoulder girdles of Jeholornis were well developed and probably allowed for better flight capability than seen in Archaeopteryx. The flight apparatus of the Jeholornis was overall quite similar to that of Confuciusornis in form and function, with forelimbs longer than hindlimbs, and a short, robust hand. However, like other basal (non-ornithothoracean) avialans and theropod dinosaurs, the shoulder blades of Jeholornis were oriented along the sides of the body, rather than on top of its back. This meant that the shoulder girdle was slung low, and according to a 2006 study by Phil Senter, would have allowed only for a typical dinosaurian motion of the shoulder. Primitive avialans like Archaeopteryx, Confuciusornis, and Jeholornis would not have been able to lift their arms vertically to achieve true flapping flight, though semi-powered gliding or parachuting would have been possible.

Examination of the claw curvature in Jeholornis suggests it may have been able to perch and may have been at least partly arboreal, spending much of its time in trees. One key adaptation of modern perching birds is the reversed, opposable first toe, or "hallux." Jeholornis was initially described as having a reversed hallux, though others cast doubt on this interpretation, noting that the reversed appearance could be an artifact of the way the fossils were crushed. Indeed, in most avialans with a reversed hallux, the foot bone where the reversed toe attaches is twisted, allowing the toe to point backward, but this feature is not found in any Jeholornis specimen. In a 2008 presentation for the conference of the Society of Avian Paleontology and Evolution (SAPE), Zhiheng Li and Yuguang Zhang re-examined the evidence for a reversed hallux in Jeholornis. They found that the hallux could appear reversed or not depending on the position the specimen was fossilized in, and that the toe bones showed intermediate adaptations between a reversed and non-reversed hallux. They concluded that the first toe of Jeholornis was generally held in reversed position, but had not yet acquired the advanced adaptations for reversal seen in more advanced perching birds.
