= Jacques Gauthier =

American paleontologist

Jacques Armand Gauthier (born June 7, 1948, in New York City) is an American vertebrate paleontologist, comparative morphologist, and systematist, and one of the founders of the use of cladistics in biology.

== Life and career ==
Gauthier is the son of Edward Paul Gauthier and Patricia Marie Grogan. He received a B.S. degree in zoology at San Diego State University in 1973, a master's in biological science at the same institute in 1980, and a PhD in paleontology from the University of California, Berkeley, in 1984. Currently he is a professor of geology and geophysics and ecology and evolutionary biology and curator of vertebrate paleontology and vertebrate zoology at Yale University. His master's thesis, the content of which was published in 1982, is a classic work on the paleontology and phylogeny of the lizard clade Anguimorpha that remains a core reference for morphological research on Xenosauridae and Anguidae in particular. His PhD thesis constituted the first major cladistic analysis of Diapsida, as well as arguing for the monophyly of the dinosaurs. He followed this with an important paper on the origin of birds from theropods. This was the first detailed cladistic analysis of the theropod dinosaurs, and initiated a revolution in dinosaur phylogenetics, in which cladistics replaced the Linnaean system in the classification and phylogenetic understanding of the dinosaurs.

Gauthier's corpus contributed the foundational phylogenetic studies of Archosauria and Lepidosauria, two major amniote clades; and he was the primary author of the foundational and still widely cited phylogenetic study of Amniota as a whole. The phylogenetic character sets from his 1984 and 1986 works, the 1988 amniote paper, and the 1988 lepidosaur and squamate papers still form the core of essentially all gross-anatomy-based phylogenetic analyses of these groups, and as such are among the most highly cited papers in amniote morphology and paleobiology. The 1988 amniote paper is also frequently cited to demonstrate the importance of taxon sampling in phylogenetic analysis, in particular the importance of sampling rare or fossil taxa that can break 'long branches' along which convergence can occur.

Gauthier has argued together with Kevin de Queiroz for replacing Linnaean taxonomy with the PhyloCode. In addition to his theoretical work on systematics and taxonomy, Gauthier continues to study the anatomy and relationships of diapsids, particularly lepidosaurs. His lizard work currently focuses on Scincomorpha, following on a career-long interest in the unusual clade Xantusiidae. He is a principal investigator on the National Science Foundation-funded effort to reconstruct the phylogeny of lizards and snakes (Squamata) using gross anatomy and molecular structure, building on his earlier work in collaboration with Richard Estes and Kevin de Queiroz, which established the most widely accepted phylogeny of the group.
