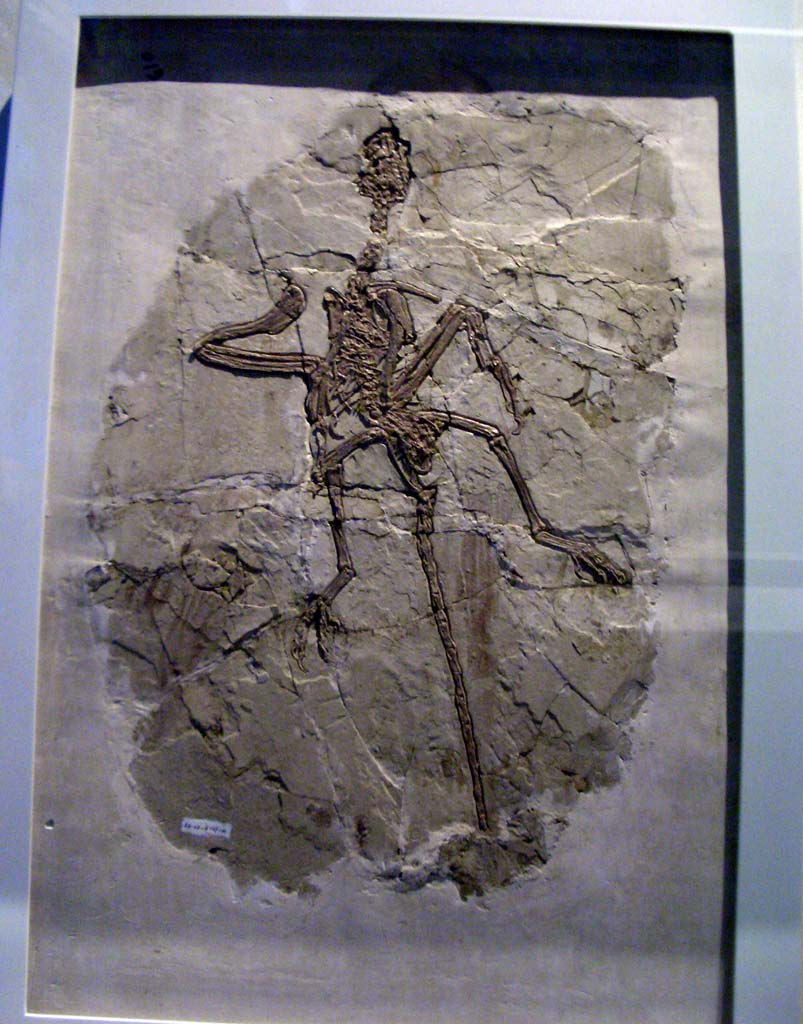

Scientific classification
- Kingdom: Animalia
- Phylum: Chordata
- Class: Reptilia
- Clade: Dinosauria
- Clade: Saurischia
- Clade: Theropoda
- Clade: Paraves
- Clade: Avialae
- Genus: †Jixiangornis; Ji et al., 2002
- Species: †J. orientalis

Binomial name
- †Jixiangornis orientalis Ji et al., 2002

= Jixiangornis =

Jixiangornis Temporal range: Early Cretaceous, 124.5 Ma

Extinct genus of dinosaurs

Jixiangornis is a genus of basal avialan dinosaurs from the Early Cretaceous. Like later avialans, it had no teeth, but it also had a long tail, unlike modern birds. Since teeth were still present in some more derived short-tailed avialans, Jixiangornis seems to have evolved its toothlessness independently of modern birds. The long forelimb (131% of hindlimb length) indicates at least some aerial ability. Jixiangornis is currently known only from a single specimen, a complete but juvenile skeleton. The fossil was found in the Yixian Formation near Beipiao City, western Liaoning, China.

== Classification ==
The only known species, J. orientalis ("Oriental bird from the Yixian Formation"), was described in November 2002. Ji et al. (2002) considered Jixiangornis capable of stronger flight than either Archaeopteryx or Jeholornis. Their phylogenetic tree shows Jixiangornis forming a clade (called "Euavialae" by Ji et al.) with birds that excludes Archaeopteryx and Jeholornis (=Shenzhouraptor).

An alternative view was presented by Zhou Zong-He and Zhang Fu-Cheng in 2006. They classified both Jixiangornis and Shenzhouraptor as junior synonyms of Jeholornis prima, meaning that Jixiangornis cannot be more advanced than Shenzhouraptor. This approach, however, was problematical given the numerous differences between Jixiangornis and Shenzhouraptor/Jeholornis, and a phylogenetic analysis performed in 2014 found that it may actually be more closely related to short-tailed avialans (Pygostylia) than to Jeholornis, as originally thought.

Animation of Jixiangornis walking

Hartman et al. (2019), Cau (2020) and Wang et al (2020) found Jixiangornis to have been a jeholornithid but not a synonym of Jeholornis.

== Sources ==
- Ji, Q; Ji, S.; Zhang, H.; You, H.; Zhang, J.; Wang, L.; Yuan, C.; Ji, X. (2002). "A New Avialian Bird - Jixiangornis orientalis gen. et sp. nov. - from the Lower Cretaceous of Western Liaoning, NE China". Journal of Nanjing University (Natural Sciences). 38 (6): 723–736.
- Zhou, Z.-H. & Zhang, F.-C. (2006): Mesozoic birds of China - A synoptic review. Vertebrata PalAsiatica 44(1): 74–98. PDF fulltext
