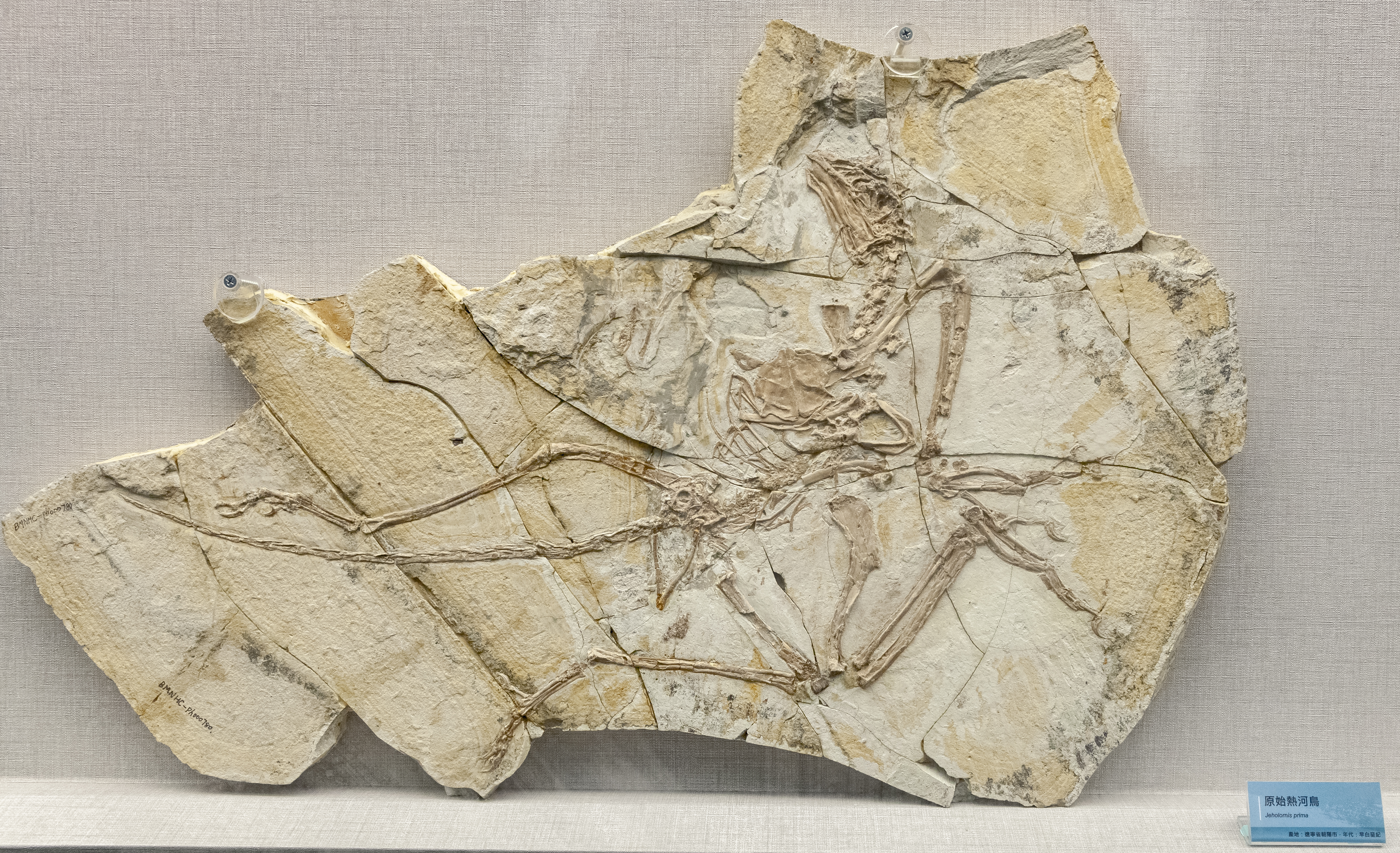
- Fossil specimen of Jeholornis prima
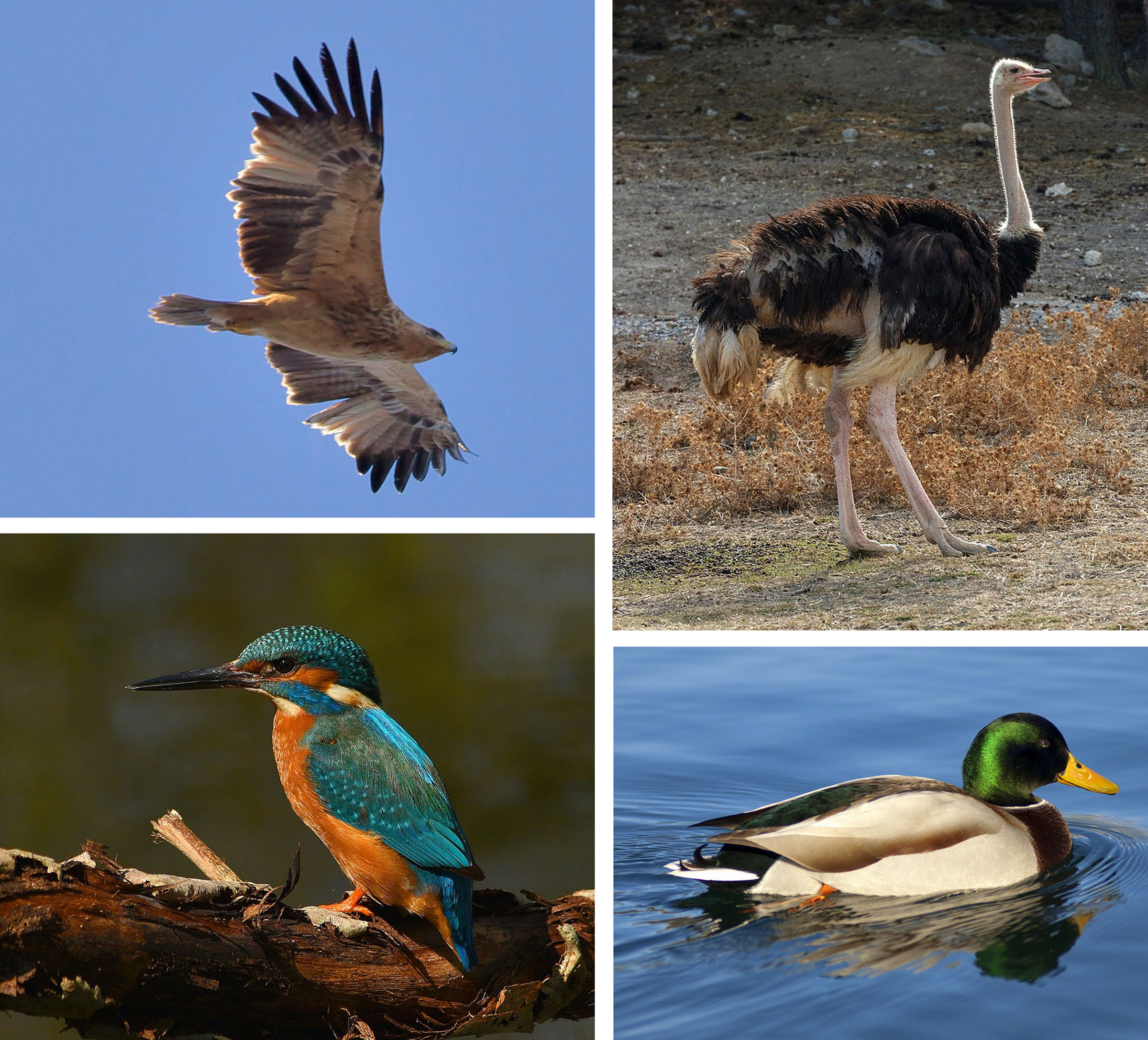
- Collage of four extant birds. Clockwise from top-left: Spanish imperial eagle (Aquila adalberti), common ostrich (Struthio camelus), mallard (Anas platyrhynchos), and common kingfisher (Alcedo atthis)

Scientific classification
- Kingdom: Animalia
- Phylum: Chordata
- Class: Reptilia
- Clade: Dinosauria
- Clade: Saurischia
- Clade: Theropoda
- Clade: Pennaraptora
- Clade: Paraves
- Clade: Avialae; Gauthier, 1986

Subgroups
- †Alcmonavis
- †Archaeopteryx
- †Baminornis
- †Cretaaviculus
- †Dalianraptor
- †Fukuipteryx
- †Gargantuavis?
- †Jixiangornis
- †Tingmiatornis?
- †Yandangornis
- †Zhongornis
- †Zhengheornithidae Xu et al., 2026
  - †Yuezhuornis
  - †Zhengheornis
- †Jeholornithidae
- Avebrevicauda Paul, 2002
  - †Omnivoropterygidae?
  - Pygostylia
Possible avialans
- †Balaur
- †Hesperonychus
- †Overoraptor
- †Rahonavis
- †Wellnhoferia
- †Yixianosaurus
- †Anchiornithidae
- †Scansoriopterygidae
- †Unenlagiinia

= Avialae =

Avialans Temporal range: Middle Jurassic–Present, 150.8–0 Ma Earliest 165 Ma if Anchiornithidae are members

Clade including all birds and their ancestors

Avialae ("bird wings") is a clade of archosaurian vertebrates containing the only living branch of dinosaurs, the birds (class Aves), and their closest relatives. It is usually defined as all theropod dinosaurs more closely related to birds than to deinonychosaurs, though alternative definitions are occasionally used (see below).

Archaeopteryx lithographica, from the late Jurassic Period Solnhofen Formation of Germany, is usually considered the earliest known avialan which may have had the capability of powered flight; a minority of studies have suggested that it might have been a deinonychosaur instead. Several older (but non flight-capable) possible avialans are known from the late Jurassic Tiaojishan Formation of China, dated to about 160 million years ago.

== Definition ==
Most researchers define Avialae as branch-based clade, though definitions vary. Many authors have used a definition similar to "all theropods closer to birds than to Deinonychus." A nearly identical definition, "the theropod group that includes all taxa closer to Passer than to Dromaeosaurus", was used by Agnolín and Novas (2013) for their clade Averaptora, operating under the assumption that troodontids and birds were more closely related to each other than to dromaeosaurs. They also redefine Avialae as the smallest clade containing Archaeopteryx and modern birds.

Additionally, beginning in the late 2000s and early 2010s, several groups of researchers began adding the genus Troodon as an additional specifier in the definition of Avialae. Troodon had long been considered a close relative of the dromaeosaurids in the larger group Deinonychosauria, though some contemporary studies found it and other troodontids more closely related to modern birds, and so it has been specifically excluded from Avialae in more recent studies.

Avialae is also occasionally defined as an apomorphy-based clade (that is, one based on derived characteristics that were not present among lineage predecessors). Jacques Gauthier, who named Avialae in 1986, redefined it in 2001 as all dinosaurs that possessed feathered wings used in flapping flight, and the birds that descended from them. The clade Avialae was given a formal phylogenetic definition in the PhyloCode by Juan Benito and colleagues in 2022 as "the largest clade containing Vultur gryphus, but not Dromaeosaurus albertensis and Saurornithoides mongoliensis". This definition ensures that both dromaeosaurids and troodontids are excluded from Avialae.

Most members of Avialae, in contrast to other theropods, have lost the proatlas bones of the neck, though they are present in Archaeopteryx.

=== Differentiation from Aves ===
Gauthier and de Queiroz (page 34) identified four conflicting ways of defining the term "Aves", which is a problem since the same biological name is being used four different ways. They proposed a solution, number 4 below, which is to reserve the term Aves only for the crown group, the last common ancestor of all living birds and all of its descendants. Other definitions of Aves found in literature were reassigned to other clade names.

1. Aves can mean all reptiles closer to birds than to crocodiles (alternatively Avemetatarsalia [=Panaves])
2. Aves can mean those advanced archosaurs with feathers (alternatively Avifilopluma)
3. Aves can mean those feathered dinosaurs that can fly (alternately Avialae)
4. Aves can mean the last common ancestor of all the currently living birds and all of its descendants (a "crown group"). (alternatively Neornithes)

Under the fourth definition Archaeopteryx is an avialan, and not a member of Aves. Gauthier's proposals have been adopted by many researchers in the field of paleontology and bird evolution, though the exact definitions applied have been inconsistent. Avialae, initially proposed to replace the traditional fossil content of Aves, is sometimes used synonymously with the vernacular term "bird" by these researchers.

== Evolution ==
- Avialae
  - †Anchiornis
  - - †Archaeopteryx
    - - †Rahonavis
      - - - †Jixiangornis
          - †Jeholornis
        - Avebrevicauda
          - †Sapeornis
          - - †Confuciusornis
            - - †Chongmingia
              - Ornithothoraces

Cladogram following the results of a phylogenetic study by Wang et al., 2016.

The earliest known avialans come from the Tiaojishan Formation of China, which has been dated to the late Jurassic period (Oxfordian stage), about 160 million years ago. The avialan species from this time period include Anchiornis huxleyi and Aurornis xui. Xiaotingia zhengi used to be considered a member, but was later classified within the clade Dromaeosauridae. The well-known Archaeopteryx dates from slightly later Jurassic rocks (about 155 million years old) from Germany. Many of these early avialans shared unusual anatomical features that may be ancestral to modern birds, but were later lost during bird evolution. These features include enlarged claws on the second toe which may have been held clear of the ground in life, and long feathers or "hind wings" covering the hind limbs and feet, which may have been used in aerial maneuvering. It is also thought that early avialans were either cranially akinetic or had otherwise limited cranial kinesis.

Avialans diversified into a wide variety of forms during the Cretaceous Period. Many groups retained primitive characteristics, such as clawed wings and teeth, though the latter were lost independently in a number of avialan groups, including modern birds (Aves). While the earliest forms, such as Archaeopteryx and Shenzhouraptor, retained the long bony tails of their ancestors, the tails of more advanced avialans were shortened with the advent of the pygostyle bone in the group Pygostylia. In the late Cretaceous, around 95 million years ago, the ancestor of all modern birds also evolved a better sense of smell.

The following cladogram is based on the analysis by Hartman et al. (2019), which found flight likely evolved five separate times among paravian dinosaurs, two of those among Avialae (in Scansoriopterygids and other avialans). Archaeopteryx and "anchiornithids" were placed in Deinonychosauria, Avialae's sister group.

- Paraves
  - †Deinonychosauria
    - †Archaeopterygidae
    - - †Unenlagiidae
      - - †Dromaeosauridae
        - †Troodontidae
  - Avialae
    - †Scansoriopterygidae
    - - †Yandangornis
      - - - †Bauxitornis
          - †Balaur
        - - †Shenzhouraptor
          - - †Jixiangornis
            - - - †Zhongornis
                - †Sapeornis
              - - †Confuciusornithidae
                - - †Changchengornis
                  - - †Chongmingia
                    - - †Jinguofortis
                      - - †Zhongjianornis
                        - Ornithothoraces

In a study conducted in 2020, Archaeopteryx was recovered as an avialan.

== See also ==
- Bird flight
- Feathered dinosaur
