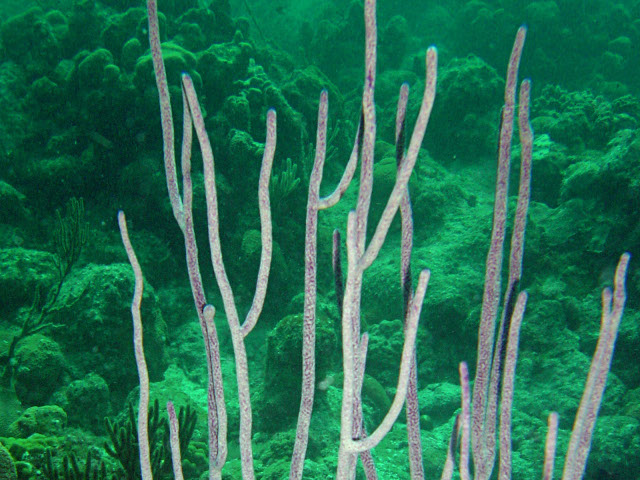
- Ellisella elongata

Scientific classification
- Kingdom: Animalia
- Phylum: Cnidaria
- Subphylum: Anthozoa
- Class: Octocorallia
- Order: Scleralcyonacea
- Family: Ellisellidae; J.E.Gray, 1859

= Ellisellidae =

Family of corals

Ellisellidae is a family of soft corals in order Scleralcyonacea.

== Genera ==
The following genera are recognized within the family Ellisellidae:

- Ctenocella Valenciennes, 1855
- Dichotella Gray, 1870
- Ellisella Gray, 1858
- Heliania Gray, 1860
- Junceella Valenciennes, 1855
- Nicella Gray, 1870
- Phenilia Gray, 1860
- Riisea Duchassaing & Michelotti, 1860
- Verrucella Milne Edwards & Haime, 1857
- Viminella Gray, 1870
