= List of Mesozoic bird-line archosaur genera (L–O) =

This list of Mesozoic bird-line archosaur genera is a comprehensive listing of all Mesozoic genera that are included in the clade Avemetatarsalia (alternatively known as Pan-Aves), including dinosaurs, pterosaurs, silesaurids, lagerpetids, and more basal genera. The list includes all commonly accepted genera whose names begin with the letters L–O. The list currently includes 316 genera.

== Scope and terminology ==
There is no official, canonical list of Mesozoic bird-line archosaur genera, but thorough attempts have been made for its various subgroups, such as George Olshevsky's Dinosaur Genera List, the book The Dinosauria, Mikko Haaramo's Phylogeny Archive, Mike Hanson's The Pterosauria, the Pterosaur Species List, Donald F. Glut's Dinosaurs: The Encyclopedia series, Holtz's list of Mesozoic dinosaurs, Molina-Perez & Larramendi's list of theropods, and Mickey Mortimer's Theropod Database. These lists have been supplemented with more recent publications to create this one.

- Genus: The generic name of the taxon, sourced to its description publication.
- Authors: Full names of the authors of the descriptions. This column can be sorted by last names.
- Year: The year when the descriptions were physically published. These are not necessarily the years the names became valid according to the rules of the International Commission on Zoological Nomenclature (ICZN).
- Formation: The geological formations each taxon was found in, along with their epoch and age. In the case of multiple formations, holotype localities are marked by an asterisk.
- Location: Every country and first-level subdivision the taxon was found in. In the case of multiple locations, holotype localities are marked by an asterisk.

== The list ==
Genus	Authors	Year	Formation	Location	Notes	Images
Labocania	Ralph E. Molnar	1974	Cerro del Pueblo Formation (Late Cretaceous, Campanian); La Bocana Roja Formation (Late Cretaceous, Cenomanian to Turonian)*	Mexico (Baja California*; Coahuila)	May have been a tyrannosaurid closely related to Teratophoneus	
Lacusovagus	Mark P. Witton	2008	Crato Formation (Early Cretaceous, Aptian)	Brazil (Ceará)	Unlike other chaoyangopterids, it lacked a bony head crest	
Laevisuchus	Friedrich von Huene; Charles A. Matley	1933	Lameta Formation (Late Cretaceous, Maastrichtian)	India (Madhya Pradesh)	Only known from three vertebrae but can confidently be assigned to the Noasauridae	
Lagerpeton	Alfred S. Romer	1971	Chañares Formation (Middle Triassic to Late Triassic, Ladinian to Carnian)	Argentina (La Rioja)	Originally described as a dinosaur relative but was actually more closely related to pterosaurs	
Lagosuchus	Alfred S. Romer	1971	Chañares Formation (Middle Triassic to Late Triassic, Ladinian to Carnian)	Argentina (La Rioja)	Closely related to, but not within, the crown dinosaurian group	
Laiyangosaurus	Jialiang Zhang; Xiao-Lin Wang; Qiang Wang; Shunxing Jiang; Xin Cheng; Ning Li; Rui Qiu	2019	Jingangkou Formation (Late Cretaceous, Campanian)	China (Shandong)	Some specimens referred to this genus actually belong to kritosaurins and lambeosaurines	
Lajasvenator	Rodolfo A. Coria; Philip J. Currie; Francisco Ortega; Mattia A. Baiano	2020	Mulichinco Formation (Early Cretaceous, Valanginian)	Argentina (Neuquén)	One of the smallest known allosauroids	
Lamarqueavis	Federico L. Agnolín	2010	Allen Formation (Late Cretaceous, Maastrichtian)*; Lance Formation (Late Cretaceous, Maastrichtian)	Argentina (Río Negro*); United States (Wyoming)	Two species were originally assigned to Cimolopteryx	
Lambeosaurus	William A. Parks	1923	Dinosaur Park Formation (Late Cretaceous, Campanian)	Canada (Alberta)	Possessed a hollow head crest that varied in shape between species, sexes, and ages, most prominently hatchet-shaped in adult male L. lambei	
Lametasaurus	Charles A. Matley	1923	Lameta Formation (Late Cretaceous, Maastrichtian)	India (Madhya Pradesh)	Described based on now lost remains, it is currently seen as a possible chimera including theropod material and osteoderms of uncertain origin	
Lamplughsaura	T. S. Kutty; Sankar Chatterjee; Peter M. Galton; Paul Upchurch	2007	Upper Dharmaram Formation (Early Jurassic, Hettangian to Sinemurian)	India (Telangana)	Large and robustly built for a sauropodiform	
Lanzhousaurus	Hailu You; Qiang Ji; Daqing Li	2005	Hekou Group (Early Cretaceous, Valanginian to Albian)	China (Gansu)	Possessed the largest known teeth of any dinosaur	
Laopteryx	Othniel C. Marsh	1881	Morrison Formation (Late Jurassic, Kimmeridgian to Tithonian)	United States (Wyoming)	A pterosaur originally thought to be a bird	
Laornis	Othniel C. Marsh	1870	Hornerstown Formation (Late Cretaceous to Paleocene, Maastrichtian to Danian)	United States (New Jersey)	Possibly an early wading bird	
Laosaurus	Othniel C. Marsh	1878	Morrison Formation (Late Jurassic, Kimmeridgian to Tithonian)	United States (Wyoming)	Several referred specimens have been reassigned to other taxa	
Lapampasaurus	Rodolfo A. Coria; Bernardo J. González Riga; Silvio Casadío	2012	Allen Formation (Late Cretaceous, Maastrichtian)	Argentina (La Pampa)	Known from a partial skeleton lacking the skull	
Laplatasaurus	Friedrich von Huene	1929	Anacleto Formation (Late Cretaceous, Campanian)	Argentina (Río Negro)	Osteoderms have been assigned to this taxon although this referral is uncertain	
Lapparentosaurus	José F. Bonaparte	1986	Isalo III Formation (Middle Jurassic, Bajocian to Bathonian)	Madagascar (Boeny)	Relatively fast-growing as evidenced by the preservation of a large amount of fibrolamellar bone	
Laquintasaura	Paul M. Barrett; Richard J. Butler; Roland Mundil; Torsten M. Scheyer; Randall B. Irmis; Marcelo R. Sánchez-Villagra	2014	La Quinta Formation (Early Jurassic, Hettangian)	Venezuela (Táchira)	One study recovered it as a basal thyreophoran despite the fact no osteoderms have been found	
Largirostrornis	Lianhai Hou	1997	Jiufotang Formation (Early Cretaceous, Aptian)	China (Liaoning)	Possibly related to Cuspirostrisornis or a synonym of Cathayornis	
Latenivenatrix	Aaron J. van der Reest; Philip J. Currie	2017	Dinosaur Park Formation (Late Cretaceous, Campanian)	Canada (Alberta)	The largest known troodontid	
Latirhinus	Albert Prieto-Márquez; Claudia I. Serrano-Brañas	2012	Cerro del Pueblo Formation (Late Cretaceous, Campanian)	Mexico (Coahuila)	As described, it represented a chimera composed of lambeosaurine and saurolophine remains, with the exact holotypic bones belonging to a lambeosaurine	
Lavocatisaurus	José I. Canudo; José L. Carballido; Alberto C. Garrido; Leonardo Salgado	2018	Rayoso Formation (Early Cretaceous, Aptian to Albian)	Argentina (Neuquén)	May have possessed a keratinous beak	
Leaellynasaura	Thomas H. Rich; Patricia Vickers-Rich	1989	Eumeralla Formation (Early Cretaceous, Aptian to Albian)	Australia (Victoria)	One referred specimen has an extremely long tail, which would be three times as long as the rest of the body if it did belong to this genus	
Lectavis	Luis M. Chiappe	1993	Lecho Formation (Late Cretaceous, Maastrichtian)	Argentina (Salta)	Large and long-legged, proportionally similar to modern shorebirds	
Ledumahadi	Blair W. McPhee; Roger B.J. Benson; Jennifer Botha-Brink; Emese M. Bordy; Jonah N. Choiniere	2018	Upper Elliot Formation (Early Jurassic, Sinemurian to Pliensbachian)	South Africa (Free State)	One of the largest Early Jurassic dinosaurs, reaching great sizes despite lacking columnar limbs like later sauropods	
Leinkupal	Pablo A. Gallina; Sebastián Apesteguía; Alejandro Haluza; Juan I. Canale	2014	Bajada Colorada Formation (Early Cretaceous, Berriasian to Valanginian)	Argentina (Neuquén)	The youngest known diplodocid	
Lenesornis	Evgeny N. Kurochkin	1996	Bissekty Formation (Late Cretaceous, Turonian)	Uzbekistan (Navoiy)	Originally considered to belong to Ichthyornis	
Leonerasaurus	Diego Pol; Alberto C. Garrido; Ignacio A. Cerda	2011	Las Leoneras Formation (Early Jurassic, Sinemurian to Toarcian)	Argentina (Chubut)	Has an unusual combination of basal and derived sauropodiform traits	
Lepidus	Sterling J. Nesbitt; Martín D. Ezcurra	2015	Colorado City Formation (Late Triassic, Norian)	United States (Texas)	Muscle scars are preserved on the holotype bones	
Leptoceratops	Barnum Brown	1914	Hell Creek Formation (Late Cretaceous, Maastrichtian); Lance Formation (Late Cretaceous, Maastrichtian); Scollard Formation (Late Cretaceous, Maastrichtian)*	Canada (Alberta*); United States (Montana; Wyoming)	Analysis of its teeth shows it could chew like a mammal, an adaptation to eating tough, fibrous plants	
Leptorhynchos	Nicholas R. Longrich; Ken Barnes; Scott Clark; Larry Millar	2013	Aguja Formation (Late Cretaceous, Campanian)	United States (Texas)	Had a slightly upturned mandible similar to those of oviraptorids	
Leptostomia	Roy E. Smith; David M. Martill; Alexander Kao; Samir Zouhri; Nicholas R. Longrich	2021	Ifezouane Formation (Early Cretaceous to Late Cretaceous, Albian to Cenomanian)	Morocco (Drâa-Tafilalet)	Possessed an extremely long and slender beak which may have been adapted for probe-feeding	
Leshansaurus	Fei Li; Guangzhao Peng; Yong Ye; Shan Jiang; Daxi Huang	2009	Shangshaximiao Formation (Late Jurassic, Oxfordian to Tithonian)	China (Sichuan)	Its braincase is nearly identical to that of Piveteausaurus	
Lesothosaurus	Peter M. Galton	1978	Upper Elliot Formation (Early Jurassic, Sinemurian to Pliensbachian)	Lesotho (Mafeteng*; Mohale's Hoek; Qacha's Nek); South Africa (Eastern Cape; Free State)	Possibly an opportunistic omnivore, feeding on meat during seasons when plants are not available	
Lessemsaurus	José F. Bonaparte	1999	Los Colorados Formation (Late Triassic, Norian)	Argentina (La Rioja)	Grew very large despite lacking the anatomical traits usually seen as a support for gigantism	
Levnesovia	Hans-Dieter Sues; Alexander O. Averianov	2009	Bissekty Formation (Late Cretaceous, Turonian)	Uzbekistan (Navoiy)	One of the smallest known hadrosauroids	
Lewisuchus	Alfred S. Romer	1972	Chañares Formation (Middle Triassic to Late Triassic, Ladinian to Carnian)	Argentina (La Rioja)	Exhibited osteoderms and adaptations for carnivory, unlike later "silesaurs"	
Lexovisaurus	Robert Hoffstetter	1957	Oxford Clay (Middle Jurassic, Callovian)	England (Cambridgeshire)	Its pelvis was greatly enlarged	
Leyesaurus	Cecilia Apaldetti; Ricardo N. Martínez; Oscar A. Alcober; Diego Pol	2011	Balde de Leyes Formation (Early Jurassic, Hettangian to Toarcian)	Argentina (San Juan)	Had a proportionately small skull	
Liaoceratops	Xing Xu; Peter J. Makovicky; Xiaolin Wang; Mark A. Norell; Hailu You	2002	Yixian Formation (Early Cretaceous, Barremian)	China (Liaoning)	One specimen was found without a skull roof, possibly displaced by a predator to eat its brain	
Liaodactylus	Changfu Zhou; Keqin Gao; Hongyu Yi; Jinzhuang Xue; Quanguo Li; Richard C. Fox	2017	Haifanggou Formation (Late Jurassic, Oxfordian)	China (Liaoning)	The earliest filter-feeding pterosaur from China	
Liaoningopterus	Xiaolin Wang; Zhonghe Zhou	2003	Jiufotang Formation (Early Cretaceous, Aptian)	China (Liaoning)	A very close relative of Anhanguera	
Liaoningornis	Lianhai Hou	1996	Yixian Formation (Early Cretaceous, Barremian)	China (Liaoning)	Originally believed to be an ornithuran, but now considered a relative of Eoalulavis	
Liaoningosaurus	Xing Xu; Xiaolin Wang; Hailu You	2001	Jiufotang Formation (Early Cretaceous, Aptian); Yixian Formation (Early Cretaceous, Barremian)*	China (Liaoning)	One specimen has been interpreted as possessing fork-like teeth, sharp claws, and stomach contents including fish, which has been claimed to be evidence of a semi-aquatic, turtle-like lifestyle	
Liaoningotitan	Changfu Zhou; Wenhao Wu; Toru Sekiya; Zhiming Dong	2018	Yixian Formation (Early Cretaceous, Barremian)	China (Liaoning)	The second sauropod named from the Yixian Formation	
Liaoningvenator	Caizhi Shen; Bo Zhao; Chunling Gao; Junchang Lü; Martin Kundrát	2017	Yixian Formation (Early Cretaceous, Barremian)	China (Liaoning)	Uniquely preserved with the head curving forwards, differing from the classic theropod "death pose" and the sleeping position of other troodontids	
Liaoxiornis	Lianhai Hou; Peiji Chen	1999	Yixian Formation (Early Cretaceous, Barremian)	China (Liaoning)	Originally considered to be a tiny adult, but later found to be a hatchling	
Liaoxipterus	Zhiming Dong; Junchang Lü	2005	Jiufotang Formation (Early Cretaceous, Aptian)	China (Liaoning)	May have been a ballistic insect feeder similar to chameleons	
Ligabueino	José F. Bonaparte	1996	La Amarga Formation (Early Cretaceous, Barremian to Aptian)	Argentina (Neuquén)	Known from a single, very small skeleton belonging to a juvenile animal	
Ligabuesaurus	José F. Bonaparte; Bernardo J. González Riga; Sebastián Apesteguia	2006	Lohan Cura Formation (Early Cretaceous, Aptian to Albian)	Argentina (Neuquén)	Its forelimbs were extremely long, with similar proportions to those of brachiosaurids	
Liliensternus	Samuel P. Welles	1984	Löwenstein Formation (Late Triassic, Norian); Trossingen Formation (Late Triassic, Norian to Rhaetian)*	Germany (Baden-Württemberg; Bavaria; Saxony-Anhalt (Thuringia*); Switzerland (Aargau)	Although commonly depicted with a head crest, there is no evidence for such a feature	
Limaysaurus	Leonardo Salgado; Alberto C. Garrido; Sergio E. Cocca; Juan R. Cocca	2004	Candeleros Formation (Late Cretaceous, Cenomanian)*; Huincul Formation (Late Cretaceous, Cenomanian to Turonian)	Argentina (Neuquén)	Possessed elongated neural spines on its dorsal vertebrae	
Limenavis	Julia A. Clarke; Luis M. Chiappe	2001	Allen Formation (Late Cretaceous, Maastrichtian)	Argentina (Río Negro)	Either the closest relative of modern birds or an early palaeognath	
Limusaurus	Xing Xu; James M. Clark; Jinyou Mo; Jonah N. Choiniere; Catherine A. Forster; Gregory M. Erickson; David W. E. Hone; Corwin Sullivan; David A. Eberth; Sterling J. Nesbitt; Qi Zhao; Rene Hernandez; Chengkai Jia; Feng-Lu Han; Yu Guo	2009	Shishugou Formation (Late Jurassic, Oxfordian)	China (Xinjiang)	Juveniles possessed teeth which were lost and replaced with a beak in adults, suggesting a change in diet	
Lingwulong	Xing Xu; Paul Upchurch; Philip D. Mannion; Paul M. Barrett; Omar R. Regalado-Fernández; Jinyou Mo; Jinfu Ma; Hongan Liu	2018	Zhiluo Formation (Middle Jurassic to Late Jurassic, Bathonian to Oxfordian)	China (Ningxia)	The first confirmed diplodocoid from Asia	
Lingyuanopterus	Yizhi Xu; Shunxing Jiang; Xiaolin Wang	2022	Jiufotang Formation (Early Cretaceous, Aptian)	China (Liaoning)	May have been adapted for scavenging, as suggested for other istiodactylids like Istiodactylus	
Lingyuanosaurus	Xi Yao; Chunchi Liao; Corwin Sullivan; Xing Xu	2019	Jehol Group (Early Cretaceous, Barremian to Aptian)	China (Liaoning)	Possessed a mix of basal and derived therizinosaurian traits	
Linhenykus	Xing Xu; Corwin Sullivan; Michael Pittman; Jonah N. Choiniere; David W. E. Hone; Paul Upchurch; Qingwei Tan; Dong Xiao; Lin Tan; Fenglu Han	2011	Bayan Mandahu Formation (Late Cretaceous, Campanian)	China (Inner Mongolia)	Completely monodactyl due to lacking the vestigial second and third fingers of other alvarezsaurids	
Linheraptor	Xing Xu; Jonah N. Choiniere; Michael Pittman; Qingwei Tan; Dong Xiao; Zhiquan Li; Lin Tan; James M. Clark; Mark A. Norell; David W. E. Hone; Corwin Sullivan	2010	Bayan Mandahu Formation (Late Cretaceous, Campanian)	China (Inner Mongolia)	Potentially a synonym of Tsaagan	
Linhevenator	Xing Xu; Qingwei Tan; Corwin Sullivan; Fenglu Han; Dong Xiao	2011	Bayan Mandahu Formation (Late Cretaceous, Campanian)	China (Inner Mongolia)	Had a greatly enlarged sickle claw, comparable in size to those of dromaeosaurids	
Linlongopterus	Taissa Rodrigues; Shunxing Jiang; Xin Cheng; Xiaolin Wang; Alexander W. A. Kellner	2015	Jiufotang Formation (Early Cretaceous, Aptian)	China (Liaoning)	Its eye socket was lower on the skull compared to other pterosaurs	
Linyiornis	Yan Wang; Min Wang; Jingmai K. O'Connor; Xiaoli Wang; Xiaoting Zheng; Xiaomei Zhang	2016	Jiufotang Formation (Early Cretaceous, Aptian)	China (Liaoning)	Known from a well-preserved skeleton complete with structures believed to be developing eggs	
Lirainosaurus	José L. Sanz; Jaime E. Powell; Jean Le Loeuff; Rubén D. F. Martínez; Xabier Pereda-Suberbiola	1999	Sobrepeña Formation (Late Cretaceous, Campanian to Maastrichtian)	Spain (Castile and León)	For a titanosaur, it was small and had a relatively gracile build	
Lishulong	Qiannan Zhang; Lei Jia; Tao Wang; Yuguang Zhang; Hailu You	2024	Lufeng Formation (Early Jurassic, Hettangian)	China (Yunnan)	Had the largest skull of any Chinese basal sauropodomorph	
Liubangosaurus	Jinyou Mo; Xing Xu; Eric Buffetaut	2010	Xinlong Formation (Early Cretaceous, Aptian to Albian)	China (Guangxi)	Described only as a eusauropod but has since been reinterpreted as a somphospondylian	
Llukalkan	Federico A. Gianechini; Ariel H. Méndez; Leonardo S. Filippi; Ariana Paulina-Carabajal; Rubén D. Juárez Valieri; Alberto C. Garrido	2020	Bajo de la Carpa Formation (Late Cretaceous, Santonian)	Argentina (Neuquén)	May have had a keen sense of hearing due to the shape of its ear	
Lohuecotitan	Verónica Díez Díaz; Pedro Mocho; Adrián Paramo; Fernando Escaso; Fátima Marcos-Fernández; José Luis Sanz; Francisco Ortega	2016	Villalba de la Sierra Formation (Late Cretaceous, Campanian to Maastrichtian)	Spain (Castilla-La Mancha)	May have had "bulb-and-root"-type osteoderms, which are abundant at the type locality	
Lokiceratops	Mark A. Loewen; Joseph J. W. Sertich; Scott D. Sampson; Jingmai K. O'Connor; Savhannah Carpenter; Brock Sisson; Anna Øhlenschlæger; Andrew A. Farke; Peter J. Makovicky; Nicholas R. Longrich; David C. Evans	2024	Judith River Formation (Late Cretaceous, Campanian)	United States (Montana)	Unusually for a ceratopsid, its frill ornamentations were bilaterally asymmetrical	
Lonchodectes	Reginald W. Hooley	1914	Chalk Group (Late Cretaceous, Turonian)	England (Kent)	Has been incorrectly considered the type species of Ornithocheirus	
Lonchodraco	Taissa Rodrigues; Alexander W. A. Kellner	2013	Chalk Group (Late Cretaceous, Cenomanian to Turonian)	England (Kent)	Contains remains originally assigned to many other genera	
Lonchodytes	Pierce Brodkorb	1963	Lance Formation (Late Cretaceous, Maastrichtian)	United States (Wyoming)	Possibly an aequornithean	
Lonchognathosaurus	Michael W. Maisch; Andreas T. Matzke; Sun Ge	2004	Lianmuqin Formation (Early Cretaceous, Aptian to Albian)	China (Xinjiang)	Had long, pointed jaws unlike those of other dsungaripterids	
Loncosaurus	Florentino Ameghino	1899	Cardiel Formation (Late Cretaceous, Maastrichtian)	Argentina (Santa Cruz)	A poorly known potential ornithopod	
Longchengornis	Lianhai Hou	1997	Jiufotang Formation (Early Cretaceous, Aptian)	China (Liaoning)	May have been a synonym of Cathayornis	
Longchengpterus	Li Wang; Li Li; Ye Duan; Shaoli Cheng	2006	Jiufotang Formation (Early Cretaceous, Aptian)	China (Liaoning)	Did not have a broad snout unlike other istiodactylids	
Longicrusavis	Jingmai K. O'Connor; Keqin Gao; Luis M. Chiappe	2010	Yixian Formation (Early Cretaceous, Barremian)	China (Liaoning)	May represent an early group of wading birds	
Longipteryx	Fucheng Zhang; Zhonghe Zhou; Lianhai Hou; Gang Gu	2001	Jiufotang Formation (Early Cretaceous, Aptian)	China (Liaoning)	Originally believed to be a piscivore or insectivore based on its teeth, but stomach contents revealed it was actually frugivorous	
Longirostravis	Lianhai Hou; Luis M. Chiappe; Fucheng Zhang; Chengming Chuong	2004	Yixian Formation (Early Cretaceous, Barremian)	China (Liaoning)	Possessed a thin snout which may have been used for probing for invertebrates in mud or bark	
Longusunguis	Min Wang; Zhonghe Zhou; Jingmai K. O'Connor; Nikita V. Zelenkov	2014	Jiufotang Formation (Early Cretaceous, Aptian)	China (Liaoning)	Had distinctly elongated pedal unguals compared to other bohaiornithids	
Lophorhothon	Wann Langston	1960	Mooreville Chalk (Late Cretaceous, Santonian)	United States (Alabama)	Although incomplete, the holotype skull preserves evidence of a crest	
Lophostropheus	Martín D. Ezcurra; Gilles Cuny	2007	Moon-Airel Formation (Late Triassic to Early Jurassic, Rhaetian to Hettangian)	France (Normandy)	The only substantially well-known theropod from the Triassic-Jurassic boundary	
Loricatosaurus	Susannah C.R. Maidment; David B. Norman; Paul M. Barrett; Paul Upchurch	2008	Marnes à Belemnopsis latesculatus Formation (Middle Jurassic, Callovian); Oxford Clay (Middle Jurassic, Callovian)*	England (Cambridgeshire*); France (Normandy)	Had narrow, flat plates on its back and round, pointed spines that ran along the tail	
Loricosaurus	Friedrich von Huene	1929	Allen Formation (Late Cretaceous, Maastrichtian)	Argentina (Neuquén)	Potentially synonymous with Neuquensaurus or Saltasaurus	
Losillasaurus	Maria Lourdes Casanovas-Cladellas; José V. Santafé; José L. Sanz	2001	Villar del Arzobispo Formation (Late Jurassic to Early Cretaceous, Tithonian to Berriasian)	Spain (Valencia)	Was heterodont, having four types of teeth, one of which was heart-shaped	
Lourinhanosaurus	Octávio Mateus	1998	Lourinhã Formation (Late Jurassic, Kimmeridgian)	Portugal (Lisbon)	More than one hundred eggs have been referred to this taxon	
Lourinhasaurus	Pedro Dantas; José L. Sanz; Carlos M. da Silva; Francisco Ortega; Vanda F. dos Santos; Mário Cachão	1998	Lourinhã Formation (Late Jurassic, Kimmeridgian)	Portugal (Lisbon)	Closely related to Camarasaurus but with proportionately longer forelimbs	
Luanchuanraptor	Junchang Lü; Li Xu; Xingliao Zhang; Qiang Ji; Songhai Jia; Weiyong Hu; Jiming Zhang; Yanhua Wu	2007	Qiupa Formation (Late Cretaceous, Maastrichtian)	China (Henan)	The first Asian dromaeosaurid found outside the Gobi Desert and northeastern China	
Luchibang	David W. E. Hone; Adam J. Fitch; Feimin Ma; Xing Xu	2020	Yixian Formation (Early Cretaceous, Barremian)	China (Inner Mongolia)	As described, it represented a chimera of istiodactylid and azhdarchoid elements	
Lucianovenator	Ricardo N. Martínez; Cecilia Apaldetti	2017	Quebrada del Barro Formation (Late Triassic, Norian)	Argentina (San Juan)	One of the few theropods known from the Rhaetian	
Ludodactylus	Eberhard Frey; David M. Martill; Marie-Céline Buchy	2003	Crato Formation (Early Cretaceous, Aptian)	Brazil (Ceará)	Combines a long toothed snout and a backwards-pointing head crest, similar to some toy pterosaurs	
Lufengosaurus	Zhongjian Yang	1940	Lufeng Formation (Early Jurassic, Hettangian to Sinemurian)	China (Yunnan)	The rib of one specimen preserves the oldest known evidence of collagen proteins	
Luopterus	David W. E. Hone	2020	Tiaojishan Formation (Late Jurassic, Oxfordian)	China (Hebei)	Originally named as a species of Dendrorhynchoides	
Luoyanggia	Junchang Lü; Li Xu; Xiaojun Jiang; Songhai Jia; Ming Li; Chongxi Yuan; Xingliao Zhang; Qiang Ji	2009	Haoling Formation (Early Cretaceous, Aptian to Albian)	China (Henan)	Originally believed to date from the Late Cretaceous	
Lurdusaurus	Philippe Taquet; Dale A. Russell	1999	Elrhaz Formation (Early Cretaceous, Barremian to Albian)	Niger (Agadez)	The proportions of its body and limbs suggest it may have been a semiaquatic herbivore similar to a hippopotamus	
Lusognathus	Alexandra E. Fernandes; Victor Beccari; Alexander W. A. Kellner; Octávio Mateus	2023	Lourinhã Formation (Late Jurassic, Kimmeridgian)	Portugal (Lisbon)	The first pterosaur described from Portugal	
Lusotitan	Miguel T. Antunes; Octávio Mateus	2003	Lourinhã Formation (Late Jurassic, Kimmeridgian)	Portugal (Lisbon)	Originally named as a European species of Brachiosaurus	
Lusovenator	Elisabete Malafaia; Pedro Mocho; Fernando Escaso; Francisco Ortega	2020	Lourinhã Formation (Late Jurassic to Early Cretaceous, Kimmeridgian to Berriasian)	Portugal (Lisbon)	The oldest carcharodontosaurian known from Eurasia	
Lutungutali	Brandon R. Peecook; Christian A. Sidor; Sterling J. Nesbitt; Roger M. H. Smith; Jean-Sébastien Steyer; Kenneth D. Angielczyk	2013	Ntawere Formation (Middle Triassic, Anisian)	Zambia (Eastern Province)	Large silesaurid material is known from contemporary deposits, but it is uncertain whether they belong to this genus	
Lycorhinus	Sidney H. Haughton	1924	Upper Elliot Formation (Early Jurassic, Sinemurian to Pliensbachian)	South Africa (Eastern Cape*; Free State)	Originally misidentified as a cynodont	
Lythronax	Mark A. Loewen; Randall B. Irmis; Joseph J. W. Sertich; Philip J. Currie; Scott D. Sampson	2013	Wahweap Formation (Late Cretaceous, Campanian)	United States (Utah)	Already had the forward-directed orbits of derived tyrannosaurids despite its early age	
Maaqwi	Sandy M. S. McLachlan; Gary W. Kaiser; Nicholas R. Longrich	2017	Northumberland Formation (Late Cretaceous, Campanian to Maastrichtian)	Canada (British Columbia)	A large marine diving bird	
Maaradactylus	Renan A. M. Bantim; Antônio A. F. Saraiva; Gustavo R. Oliveira; Juliana M. Sayão	2014	Romualdo Formation (Early Cretaceous, Albian)	Brazil (Ceará)	One potential species was originally assigned to Coloborhynchus and Anhanguera	
Machairasaurus	Nicholas R. Longrich; Philip J. Currie; Zhiming Dong	2010	Bayan Mandahu Formation (Late Cretaceous, Campanian)	China (Inner Mongolia)	Its hand claws are elongated and blade-like in side view	
Machairoceratops	Eric K. Lund; Patrick M. O'Connor; Mark A. Loewen; Zubair A. Jinnah	2016	Wahweap Formation (Late Cretaceous, Campanian)	United States (Utah)	Possessed two long, forward-pointing horns on the top of its frill	
Macrocollum	Rodrigo T. Müller; Max C. Langer; Sérgio Dias-da-Silva	2018	Candelária Formation (Late Triassic, Carnian)	Brazil (Rio Grande do Sul)	One of the oldest sauropodomorphs with an extremely elongated neck	
Macrogryphosaurus	Jorge O. Calvo; Juan D. Porfiri; Fernando E. Novas	2007	Sierra Barrosa Formation (Late Cretaceous, Coniacian)	Argentina (Neuquén)	Preserves a series of mineralized plates along the side of the torso	
Macrurosaurus	Harry G. Seeley	1869	Cambridge Greensand (Early Cretaceous, Albian)	England (Cambridgeshire)	Only known from a series of caudal vertebrae	
Magnamanus	Carolina Fuentes-Vidarte; Manuel Meijide-Calvo; Federico Meijide-Fuentes; Manuel Meijide-Fuentes	2016	Golmayo Formation (Early Cretaceous, Hauterivian to Barremian)	Spain (Castile and León)	Possessed relatively enlarged hands	
Magnapaulia	Albert Prieto-Márquez; Luis M. Chiappe; Shantanu H. Joshi	2012	El Gallo Formation (Late Cretaceous, Santonian to Maastrichtian)	Mexico (Baja California)	Has been suggested to be semi-aquatic due to its tall, narrow tail	
Magnosaurus	Friedrich von Huene	1932	Inferior Oolite (Middle Jurassic, Bajocian)	England (Dorset)	Confusingly, a referred specimen was simultaneously named as a species of this genus and of Sarcosaurus	
Magnusavis	Alexander D. Clark; Jessie Atterholt; John B. Scannella; Nathan Carroll; Jingmai K. O'Connor	2024	Hell Creek Formation (Late Cretaceous, Maastrichtian)	United States (Montana)	A large enantiornithean closely related to avisaurids, sharing with them robust metatarsals suggesting a raptorial ecology	
Magyarosaurus	Friedrich von Huene	1932	Sânpetru Formation (Late Cretaceous, Maastrichtian)	Romania (Hunedoara)	An insular dwarf titanosaur that was one of the smallest of its group	
Mahakala	Alan H. Turner; Diego Pol; Julia A. Clarke; Gregory M. Erickson; Mark A. Norell	2007	Djadokhta Formation (Late Cretaceous, Campanian)	Mongolia (Ömnögovi)	Possessed basal traits for a dromaeosaurid	
Mahuidacursor	Penélope Cruzado-Caballero; José M. Gasca; Leonardo S. Filippi; Ignacio A. Cerda; Alberto C. Garrido	2019	Bajo de la Carpa Formation (Late Cretaceous, Santonian)	Argentina (Neuquén)	Its holotype was sexually mature but not fully grown	
Maiasaura	John R. Horner; Robert Makela	1979	Two Medicine Formation (Late Cretaceous, Campanian)	United States (Montana)	Remains of hundreds of individuals, including juveniles, eggs, and nests, have been found at a single site	
Maip	Alexis M. Aranciaga Rolando; Matías J. Motta; Federico L. Agnolín; Makoto Manabe; Takanobu Tsuijihi; Fernando E. Novas	2022	Chorrillo Formation (Late Cretaceous, Maastrichtian)	Argentina (Santa Cruz)	The largest and youngest megaraptoran	
Majungasaurus	René J. M. Lavocat	1955	Maevarano Formation (Late Cretaceous, Maastrichtian)	Madagascar (Boeny)	Bite marks on several specimens have been found to perfectly match the teeth of this genus, suggesting cannibalistic tendencies	
Malarguesaurus	Bernardo J. González Riga; Elena Previtera; Cecilia A. Pirrone	2008	Portezuelo Formation (Late Cretaceous, Turonian to Coniacian)	Argentina (Mendoza)	A large and robustly built sauropod	
Malawisaurus	Louis L. Jacobs; Dale A. Winkler; William R. Downs; Elizabeth M. Gomani	1993	Dinosaur Beds (Early Cretaceous, Barremian to Aptian)	Malawi (Northern Region)	Known from abundant material, including elements from the skull and osteoderms, but they may not represent a single taxon	
Maleevus	Tatyana A. Tumanova	1987	Bayanshiree Formation (Late Cretaceous, Cenomanian to Coniacian)	Mongolia (Ömnögovi)	Its only purportedly distinguishing trait is also shared with Pinacosaurus	
Malefica	Albert Prieto-Márquez; Jonathan R. Wagner	2023	Aguja Formation (Late Cretaceous, Campanian)	United States (Texas)	Its discovery suggests a greater diversity of basal hadrosaurids than previously thought	
Mambachiton	Sterling J. Nesbitt; Emily Patellos; Christian F. Kammerer; Lovasoa Ranivoharimanana; André R. Wyss; John J. Flynn	2023	Makay Formation (Middle Triassic to Late Triassic, Ladinian to Carnian)	Madagascar (Atsimo-Andrefana)	One of the most primitive bird-like archosaurs, with a pseudosuchian-like body plan and osteoderms	
Mamenchisaurus	Zhongjian Yang	1954	Penglaizhen Formation (Early Cretaceous, Berriasian to Valanginian); Shangshaximiao Formation (Late Jurassic, Oxfordian to Tithonian)*; Shishugou Formation (Middle Jurassic to Late Jurassic, Callovian to Oxfordian); Suining Formation (Late Jurassic, Tithonian)	China (Chongqing; Gansu; Sichuan*; Xinjiang)	Several species have been named, but most may not belong to this genus	
Mandschurosaurus	Anatoly N. Riabinin	1930	Yuliangze Formation (Late Cretaceous, Maastrichtian)	China (Heilongjiang)	One of the first non-avian dinosaurs named from Chinese remains	
Manidens	Diego Pol; Oliver W. M. Rauhut; Marcos Becerra	2011	Cañadón Asfalto Formation (Early Jurassic, Toarcian)	Argentina (Chubut)	May have been arboreal due to the structure of its feet, with toes adapted for grasping	
Mansourasaurus	Hesham M. Sallam; Eric Gorscak; Patrick M. O'Connor; Iman A. El-Dawoudi; Sanaa El-Sayed; Sara Saber; Mahmoud A. Kora; Joseph J. W. Sertich; Erik R. Seiffert; Matthew C. Lamanna	2018	Quseir Formation (Late Cretaceous, Campanian)	Egypt (New Valley)	One of the few Late Cretaceous sauropods known from Africa	
Mantellisaurus	Gregory S. Paul	2007	La Huérguina Formation (Early Cretaceous, Barremian); Lower Greensand Group (Early Cretaceous, Aptian to Albian); Sainte-Barbe Clays Formation (Early Cretaceous, Barremian to Aptian); Vectis Formation (Early Cretaceous, Barremian)*	Belgium (Wallonia); England (Isle of Wight; Kent); Spain (Castilla-La Mancha)	Distinguishable from the contemporary Iguanodon by its more gracile build	
Mapusaurus	Rodolfo A. Coria; Philip J. Currie	2006	Huincul Formation (Late Cretaceous, Cenomanian to Turonian)	Argentina (Neuquén)	At least seven specimens of different growth stages are known, possibly suggesting that this taxon lived and/or hunted in packs	
Maraapunisaurus	Kenneth Carpenter	2018	Morrison Formation (Late Jurassic, Kimmeridgian to Tithonian)	United States (Colorado)	Named from a single, lost vertebra of immense size	
Marasuchus	Paul C. Sereno; Andrea B. Arcucci	1994	Chañares Formation (Middle Triassic to Late Triassic, Ladinian to Carnian)	Argentina (La Rioja)	Possibly synonymous with Lagosuchus	
Marmarospondylus	Richard Owen	1875	Forest Marble Formation (Middle Jurassic, Bathonian)	England (Wiltshire)	Usually assigned to the genus Bothriospondylus, but this cannot be confirmed	
Marshosaurus	James H. Madsen	1976	Morrison Formation (Kimmeridgian)	United States (Utah)	Potentially a close relative of Piatnitzkysaurus and Condorraptor	
Martharaptor	Phil Senter; James I. Kirkland; Donald D. DeBlieux	2012	Cedar Mountain Formation (Early Cretaceous, Berriasian to Valanginian)	United States (Utah)	Had not yet acquired the robust feet of derived therizinosaurs	
Martinavis	Cyril A. Walker; Eric Buffetaut; Gareth J. Dyke	2007	Argiles et Grès à Reptiles Formation (Late Cretaceous, Campanian)*; Lecho Formation (Late Cretaceous, Maastrichtian)	Argentina (Salta); France (Occitania*)	Although known only from humeri, this genus was large and lived in a broad range	
Masiakasaurus	Scott D. Sampson; Matthew T. Carrano; Catherine A. Forster	2001	Maevarano Formation (Late Cretaceous, Maastrichtian)	Madagascar (Boeny)	Possessed procumbent teeth at the tips of its jaws which may indicate a feeding specialization	
Massospondylus	Richard Owen	1854	Clarens Formation (Early Jurassic, Pliensbachian to Toarcian); Forest Sandstone (Early Jurassic, Hettangian to Sinemurian); Upper Elliot Formation (Early Jurassic, Sinemurian to Pliensbachian)*	Lesotho (Mafeteng); South Africa (Eastern Cape; Free State*); Zimbabwe (Matabeleland North)	Abundant remains have been discovered	
Matheronodon	Pascal Godefroit; Géraldine Garcia; Bernard Gomez; Koen Stein; Aude Cincotta; Ulysse Lefèvre; Xavier Valentin	2017	Argiles et Grès à Reptiles Formation (Late Cretaceous, Campanian)	France (Provence-Alpes-Côte d'Azur)	Had extremely specialized dentition that may have been an adaptation to feeding on tough monocot plants	
Maxakalisaurus	Alexander W. A. Kellner; Diogenes A. Campos; Sergio A. K. de Azevedo; Marcelo N. F. Trotta; Deise D. R. Henriques; Maureen M. T. Craik; Helder P. Silva	2006	Adamantina Formation (Late Cretaceous, Coniacian to Maastrichtian)	Brazil (Minas Gerais)	Unusually for a sauropod, it had ridged teeth	
Mbiresaurus	Christopher T. Griffin; Brenen M. Wynd; Darlington Munyikwa; Tim J. Broderick; Michel Zondo; Stephen Tolan; Max C. Langer; Sterling J. Nesbitt; Hazel R. Taruvinga	2022	Pebbly Arkose Formation (Late Triassic, Carnian)	Zimbabwe (Mashonaland Central)	One of the oldest dinosaurs known from Africa, helping prove that the earliest dinosaurs were restricted to low latitudes	
Medusaceratops	Michael J. Ryan; Anthony P. Russell; Scott Hartman	2010	Judith River Formation (Late Cretaceous, Campanian)	United States (Montana)	Possessed elongated spikes curving away from the sides of its frill	
Meemannavis	Jingmai K. O'Connor; Thomas A. Stidham; Jerald D. Harris; Matthew C. Lamanna; Alida M. Bailleul; Han Hu; Min Wang; Hailu You	2022	Xiagou Formation (Early Cretaceous, Aptian)	China (Gansu)	The lower jaw and tip of the upper jaw are toothless, but it may have had teeth farther back in its upper jaw	
Megalosaurus	William Buckland	1824	Taynton Limestone Formation (Middle Jurassic, Bathonian)	England (Oxfordshire)	The first non-avian dinosaur scientifically named and described	
Megapnosaurus	Michael A. Ivie; Stanisław Adam Ślipiński; Piotr Węrgzynowicz	2001	Forest Sandstone (Early Jurassic, Hettangian to Sinemurian)*; Upper Elliot Formation (Early Jurassic, Sinemurian to Pliensbachian)	South Africa (Free State); Zimbabwe (Matabeleland North*)	Might belong to the genus Coelophysis	
Megaraptor	Fernando E. Novas	1998	Portezuelo Formation (Late Cretaceous, Turonian to Coniacian)	Argentina (Neuquén)	Possessed a large, strongly curved claw on its first finger	
Mei	Xing Xu; Mark A. Norell	2004	Yixian Formation (Early Cretaceous, Barremian)	China (Liaoning)	Two specimens are preserved in bird-like sleeping positions	
Meilifeilong	Xiaolin Wang; Alexander W. A. Kellner; Shunxing Jiang; He Chen; Fabiana R. Costa; Xin Cheng; Xinjun Zhang; Bruno C. Vila Nova; Diogenes A. Campos; Juliana M. Sayão; Taissa Rodrigues; Renan A. M. Bantim; Antônio A. F. Saraiva; Zhonghe Zhou	2023	Jiufotang Formation (Early Cretaceous, Aptian)	China (Liaoning)	The most completely known chaoyangopterid	
Melanorosaurus	Sidney H. Haughton	1924	Lower Elliot Formation (Late Triassic, Norian)	South Africa (Eastern Cape)	Some specimens assigned to this genus do not represent the same taxon	
Melkamter	Alexandra E. Fernandes; Diego Pol; Oliver W. M. Rauhut	2024	Cañadón Asfalto Formation (Early Jurassic, Toarcian)	Argentina (Chubut)	One of the oldest known monofenestratans	
Mendozasaurus	Bernardo J. González Riga	2003	Sierra Barrosa Formation (Late Cretaceous, Coniacian)	Argentina (Mendoza)	Had spherical osteoderms that were probably located in rows along the flanks	
Menefeeceratops	Sebastian G. Dalman; Spencer G. Lucas; Steven E. Jasinski; Asher J. Lichtig; Peter Dodson	2021	Menefee Formation (Late Cretaceous, Campanian)	United States (New Mexico)	One of the oldest centrosaurines	
Mengciusornis	Min Wang; Jingmai K. O'Connor; Shuang Zhou; Zhonghe Zhou	2020	Jiufotang Formation (Early Cretaceous, Aptian)	China (Liaoning)	Had large curved teeth, unlike its closest relative Schizooura	
Menucocelsior	Alexis M. Aranciaga Rolando; Jordi A. García Marsà; Federico L. Agnolín; Matías J. Motta; Sebastián Rozadilla; Fernando E. Novas	2022	Allen Formation (Late Cretaceous, Maastrichtian)	Argentina (Río Negro)	Coexisted with multiple other titanosaurs that may have niche-partitioned	
Meraxes	Juan I. Canale; Sebastián Apesteguía; Pablo A. Gallina; Jonathan Mitchell; Nathan D. Smith; Thomas M. Cullen; Akiko Shinya; Alejandro Haluza; Federico A. Gianechini; Peter J. Makovicky	2022	Huincul Formation (Late Cretaceous, Cenomanian to Turonian)	Argentina (Neuquén)	Possessed reduced forelimbs convergent with several other groups of theropods	
Mercuriceratops	Michael J. Ryan; David C. Evans; Philip J. Currie; Mark A. Loewen	2014	Dinosaur Park Formation (Late Cretaceous, Campanian); Judith River Formation (Late Cretaceous, Campanian*)	Canada (Alberta); United States (Montana*)	Had "wing"-like projections on its squamosal bones	
Meroktenos	Claire Peyre de Fabrègues; Ronan Allain	2016	Lower Elliot Formation (Late Triassic, Norian)	Lesotho (Mafeteng)	Its femur was unusually robust for an animal of its size	
Mesadactylus	James A. Jensen; Kevin Padian	1989	Morrison Formation (Late Jurassic, Kimmeridgian to Tithonian)	United States (Colorado)	Possibly the only North American anurognathid	
Metriacanthosaurus'	Alick D. Walker	1964	Oxford Clay (Middle Jurassic, Callovian)	England (Dorset)	Possessed relatively tall neural spines for a carnosaur	
Microceratus	Octávio Mateus	2008	Ulansuhai Formation (Late Cretaceous, Turonian)	China (Inner Mongolia)	Originally named Microceratops, although that genus name is preoccupied by a wasp	
Microcoelus	Richard Lydekker	1893	Bajo de la Carpa Formation (Late Cretaceous, Santonian)	Argentina (Neuquén)	May be a synonym of Neuquensaurus	
Microenantiornis	Zhaoying Wei; Li Li	2017	Jiufotang Formation (Early Cretaceous, Aptian)	China (Liaoning)	A small member enantiornithean which possessed several primitive and derived features compared to other members of the group	
Microhadrosaurus	Zhiming Dong	1979	Nanxiong Formation (Late Cretaceous, Maastrichtian)	China (Jiangxi)	Reportedly an unusually small hadrosaurid	
Micropachycephalosaurus	Zhiming Dong	1978	Wangshi Group (Late Cretaceous, Campanian)	China (Shandong)	Had the longest name of any known dinosaur	
Microraptor	Xing Xu; Zhonghe Zhou; Xiaolin Wang	2000	Jiufotang Formation (Early Cretaceous, Aptian)	China (Liaoning)	Known from over three hundred fossils, several of which well-preserved enough to reveal fine details such as feather covering and an iridescent black coloration	
Microtuban	Ross A. Elgin; Eberhard Frey	2011	Sannine Formation (Late Cretaceous, Cenomanian)	Lebanon (Mount Lebanon)	Known from a skull-less juvenile skeleton	
Microvenator	John H. Ostrom	1970	Cloverly Formation (Early Cretaceous, Albian)	United States (Montana)	Teeth from Deinonychus have been mistakenly attributed to this genus	
Mierasaurus	Rafael Royo-Torres; Paul Upchurch; James I. Kirkland; Donald D. DeBlieux; John R. Foster; Alberto Cobos; Luis Alcalá	2017	Cedar Mountain Formation (Early Cretaceous, Berriasian to Valanginian)	United States (Utah)	One of the latest-surviving turiasaurs	
Migmanychion	Xuri Wang; Andrea Cau; Zhengdong Wang; Kaifeng Yu; Wenhao Wu; Yang Wang; Yichuan Liu	2023	Longjiang Formation (Early Cretaceous, Barremian to Aptian)	China (Inner Mongolia)	Its hand combines features of multiple groups of coelurosaurs	
Mimodactylus	Alexander W. A. Kellner; Michael W. Caldwell; Borja Holgado; Fabio M. Dalla Vecchia; Roy Nohra; Juliana M. Sayão; Philip J. Currie	2019	Sannine Formation (Late Cretaceous, Cenomanian)	Lebanon (Mount Lebanon)	The most complete pterosaur known from the Arabian peninsula	
Minimocursor	Sita Manitkoon; Uthumporn Deesri; Bouziane Khalloufi; Thanit Nonsrirach; Varavudh Suteethorn; Phornphen Chanthasit; Wansiri Boonla; Eric Buffetaut	2023	Phu Kradung Formation (Late Jurassic, Tithonian)	Thailand (Kalasin)	The first basal neornithischian known from southeastern Asia	
Minmi	Ralph E. Molnar	1980	Bungil Formation (Early Cretaceous, Valanginian to Aptian)	Australia (Queensland)	Had long legs for an ankylosaur, possibly to help it run into bushes for protection	
Minotaurasaurus	Clifford A. Miles; Clark J. Miles	2009	Djadokhta Formation (Late Cretaceous, Campanian)	Mongolia (Ömnögovi)	The holotype skull was excavated illegally, which obscured its true provenance until recently	
Minqaria	Nicholas R. Longrich; Xabier Pereda-Suberbiola; Nathalie Bardet; Nour-Eddine Jalil	2024	Couche III (Late Cretaceous, Maastrichtian)	Morocco (Béni Mellal-Khénifra)	Known from a partial skull	
Miragaia	Octávio Mateus; Susannah C.R. Maidment; Nicolai A. Christiansen	2009	Lourinhã Formation (Late Jurassic, Kimmeridgian)	Portugal (Lisbon)	Had an extremely elongated neck made up of seventeen vertebrae	
Mirarce	Jessie Atterholt; J. Howard Hutchison; Jingmai K. O'Connor	2018	Kaiparowits Formation (Late Cretaceous, Campanian)	United States (Utah)	The most complete known North American avisaurid	
Mirischia	Darren Naish; David M. Martill; Eberhard Frey	2004	Romualdo Formation (Early Cretaceous, Albian)	Brazil (Pernambuco)	Its holotype preserves an intestine	
Mirusavis	Min Wang; Jingmai K. O'Connor; Alida M. Bailleul; Zhiheng Li	2020	Yixian Formation (Early Cretaceous, Barremian)	China (Liaoning)	Its holotype was a small osteologically immature female preserved with medullary bone tissue	
Mistralazhdarcho	Romain Vullo; Géraldine Garcia; Pascal Godefroit; Aude Cincotta; Xavier Valentin	2018	Aix-en-Provence Basin (Late Cretaceous, Campanian)	France (Provence-Alpes-Côte d'Azur)	Had a unique protrusion on its beak near the tip	
Mnyamawamtuka	Eric Gorscak; Patrick M. O'Connor	2019	Galula Formation (Early Cretaceous to Late Cretaceous, Aptian to Cenomanian)	Tanzania (Songwe)	Its specific name, moyowamkia, is Kiswahili for "heart tail", which references the heart-shaped cross-section of its caudal vertebrae	
Moabosaurus	Brooks B. Britt; Rodney D. Scheets; Michael F. Whiting; D. Ray Wilhite	2017	Cedar Mountain Formation (Early Cretaceous, Berriasian to Valanginian)	United States (Utah)	Described as a macronarian but has since been reinterpreted as a turiasaur closely related to Mierasaurus	
Mochlodon	Harry G. Seeley	1881	Csehbánya Formation (Late Cretaceous, Santonian); Grünbach Formation (Late Cretaceous, Campanian)*	Austria (Lower Austria*); Hungary (Veszprém)	The type specimen was originally named as a species of Iguanodon	
Moganopterus	Junchang Lü; Hanyong Pu; Li Xu; Yanhua Wu; Xuefang Wei	2012	Yixian Formation (Early Cretaceous, Barremian)	China (Liaoning)	Originally believed to be one of the largest toothed pterosaurs, although a redescription of the holotype reduced its size to half of its original estimate	
Mongolosaurus	Charles W. Gilmore	1933	On Gong Formation (Early Cretaceous, Aptian to Albian)	China (Inner Mongolia)	Known from only scant remains but has been confidently assigned to the Somphospondyli in recent years	
Mongolostegus	Tatyana A. Tumanova; Vladimir R. Alifanov	2018	Dzunbain Formation (Early Cretaceous, Aptian to Albian)	Mongolia (Dornogovi)	Although informally assigned to the genus Wuerhosaurus before its formal description, it may have been either a relative of Huayangosaurus or an early-diverging stegosaurid	
Monkonosaurus	Xijin Zhao	1983	Loe-ein Formation (Late Jurassic, Oxfordian to Tithonian)	China (Tibet)	Poorly known and potentially informally described	
Monoclonius	Edward D. Cope	1876	Judith River Formation (Late Cretaceous, Campanian)	United States (Montana)	Only known from indistinct remains of juveniles and subadults	
Monoenantiornis	Han Hu; Jingmai K. O'Connor	2017	Yixian Formation (Early Cretaceous, Barremian)	China (Liaoning)	Known from a juvenile specimen which depicts how various features developed in enantiornitheans as they age	
Monolophosaurus	Xijin Zhao; Philip J. Currie	1993	Shishugou Formation (Middle Jurassic to Late Jurassic, Callovian to Oxfordian)	China (Xinjiang)	Possessed a short, rectangular crest running along the midline of the skull	
Mononykus	Altangerel Perle; Mark A. Norell; Luis M. Chiappe; James M. Clark	1993	Nemegt Formation (Late Cretaceous, Maastrichtian)	Mongolia (Ömnögovi)	Proposed to have an anteater-like lifestyle, using its unique forearms to break into termite mounds	
Montanazhdarcho	Kevin Padian; Armand J. de Ricqlés; John R. Horner	1995	Two Medicine Formation (Late Cretaceous, Campanian)	United States (Montana)	One of the smaller azhdarchid-line pterosaurs	
Montanoceratops	Charles M. Sternberg	1951	Horseshoe Canyon Formation (Late Cretaceous, Maastrichtian); St. Mary River Formation (Late Cretaceous, Maastrichtian)*	Canada (Alberta); United States (Montana*)	Often restored with a short nasal horn although this may be a misplaced cheek horn	
Morelladon	José M. Gasulla; Fernando Escaso; Iván Narváez; Francisco Ortega; José L. Sanz	2015	Arcillas de Morella Formation (Early Cretaceous, Barremian)	Spain (Valencia)	Possessed a neural spine sail lower than that of Ouranosaurus	
Morinosaurus	Henri É. Sauvage	1874	Kimmeridge Clay (Late Jurassic, Kimmeridgian)	France (Hauts-de-France)	A poorly known sauropod	
Moros	Lindsay E. Zanno; Ryan T. Tucker; Aurore Canoville; Haviv M. Avrahami; Terry A. Gates; Peter J. Makovicky	2019	Cedar Mountain Formation (Early Cretaceous to Late Cretaceous, Albian to Cenomanian)	United States (Utah)	The proportions of its metatarsals are similar to those of ornithomimids	
Morrosaurus	Sebastián Rozadilla; Federico L. Agnolín; Fernando E. Novas; Alexis M. Aranciaga Rolando; Matías J. Motta; Juan M. Liria; Marcelo P. Isasi	2016	Snow Hill Island Formation (Late Cretaceous, Maastrichtian)	Antarctica (Argentine Antarctica; British Antarctic Territory; Chilean Antarctic Territory)	Closely related to Australian and South American ornithopods	
Mosaiceratops	Wenjie Zheng; Xingsheng Jin; Xing Xu	2015	Xiaguan Formation (Late Cretaceous, Turonian to Campanian)	China (Henan)	Combined features of different groups of basal ceratopsians	
Murusraptor	Rodolfo A. Coria; Philip J. Currie	2016	Sierra Barrosa Formation (Late Cretaceous, Coniacian)	Argentina (Neuquén)	Had a brain morphology similar to that of tyrannosaurids but its sensory capabilities were closer to the level of allosauroids	
Musankwa	Paul M. Barrett; Kimberley E.J. Chapelle; Lara Sciscio; Timothy J. Broderick; Michel Zondo; Darlington Munyikwa; Jonah N. Choiniere	2024	Pebbly Arkose Formation (Late Triassic, Carnian)	Zimbabwe (Mashonaland West)	The fourth dinosaur genus to be named from Zimbabwe	
Musivavis	Xuri Wang; Andrea Cau; Xiaoling Luo; Martin Kundrát; Wensheng Wu; Shubin Ju; Zhen Guo; Yichuan Liu; Qiang Ji	2022	Jiufotang Formation (Early Cretaceous, Aptian)	China (Liaoning)	Most similar to bohaiornithids but also has features of other groups of enantiornitheans	
Mussaurus	José F. Bonaparte; Martin Vince	1979	Laguna Colorada Formation (Early Jurassic, Sinemurian)	Argentina (Santa Cruz)	Multiple specimens from different growth stages are known, showing that juveniles may have been quadrupedal and only shifted to bipedality as adults	
Muttaburrasaurus	Alan Bartholomai; Ralph E. Molnar	1981	Mackunda Formation (Early Cretaceous, Albian)	Australia (Queensland)	Possessed a short oval bump on its snout	
Muyelensaurus	Jorge O. Calvo; Bernardo J. González Riga; Juan D. Porfiri	2007	Plottier Formation (Late Cretaceous, Coniacian to Santonian)	Argentina (Neuquén)	Relatively gracile for a titanosaur	
Muzquizopteryx	Eberhard Frey; Marie-Céline Buchy; Wolfgang Stinnesbeck; Arturo González González; Alfredo di Stefano	2006	Austin Chalk (Late Cretaceous, Coniacian to Santonian)	Mexico (Coahuila)	One of the smallest known adult pterosaurs	
Mymoorapelta	James I. Kirkland; Kenneth Carpenter	1994	Morrison Formation (Late Jurassic, Kimmeridgian)	United States (Colorado)	The first ankylosaur described from the Morrison Formation	
Mystiornis	Evgeny N. Kurochkin; Nikita V. Zelenkov; Alexander O. Averianov; Sergei V. Leshchinsky	2011	Ilek Formation (Early Cretaceous, Barremian to Aptian)	Russia (Kemerovo Oblast)	An aquatic bird that possesses a myriad of features from various groups in Paraves, although it most closely resembles avisaurids among sampled groups	
Mythunga	Ralph E. Molnar; Richard A. Thulborn	2008	Toolebuc Formation (Early Cretaceous, Albian)	Australia (Queensland)	May be a dubious, indeterminate tropeognathine	
Naashoibitosaurus	Adrian P. Hunt; Spencer G. Lucas	1993	Kirtland Formation (Late Cretaceous, Campanian)	United States (New Mexico)	Like other kritosaurins, it possessed a nasal arch, but it was not as tall as that of Gryposaurus	
Nambalia	Fernando E. Novas; Martín D. Ezcurra; Sankar Chatterjee; T. S. Kutty	2010	Upper Maleri Formation (Late Triassic, Norian)	India (Telangana)	Known from the remains of two individuals	
Nanantius	Ralph E. Molnar	1986	Toolebuc Formation (Early Cretaceous, Albian)	Australia (Queensland)	Fragmentary, but may have been a seabird because remains from this genus have been found as ichthyosaur gut content	
Nankangia	Junchang Lü; Laiping Yi; Hui Zhong; Xuefang Wei	2013	Nanxiong Formation (Late Cretaceous, Maastrichtian)	China (Jiangxi)	May have been specialized in eating soft foods such as leaves and seeds	
Nanningosaurus	Jinyou Mo; Zhongru Zhao; Wei Wang; Xing Xu	2007	Nalong Basin (Late Cretaceous, Maastrichtian)	China (Guangxi)	Potentially a basal lambeosaurine	
Nanosaurus	Othniel C. Marsh	1877	Morrison Formation (Late Jurassic, Kimmeridgian to Tithonian)	United States (Colorado)	Several genera such as Drinker, Othnielia, and Othnielosaurus have been referred to this genus, but this synonymy cannot be confirmed	
Nanshiungosaurus	Zhiming Dong	1979	Nanxiong Formation (Late Cretaceous, Maastrichtian)	China (Guangdong)	Originally misidentified as a sauropod on account of its unusual pelvis	
Nanuqsaurus	Anthony R. Fiorillo; Ronald S. Tykoski	2014	Prince Creek Formation (Late Cretaceous, Campanian to Maastrichtian)	United States (Alaska)	Described as a dwarf tyrannosaurid although undescribed remains suggest a size comparable to Albertosaurus	
Nanyangosaurus	Xing Xu; Xijin Zhao; Junchang Lü; Wangbo Huang; Zhanyang Li; Zhiming Dong	2000	Xiaguan Formation (Late Cretaceous, Turonian to Campanian)	China (Henan)	Completely lost the first digit of its hands	
Napaisaurus	Shu-An Ji; Pei Zhang	2022	Xinlong Formation (Early Cretaceous, Aptian to Albian)	China (Guangxi)	May be closely related to contemporary Thai iguanodonts	
Narambuenatitan	Leonardo S. Filippi; Rodolfo A. García; Alberto C. Garrido	2011	Anacleto Formation (Late Cretaceous, Campanian)	Argentina (Neuquén)	Its neural spines are very similar to those of Epachthosaurus	
Narindasaurus	Rafael Royo-Torres; Alberto Cobos; Pedro Mocho; Luis Alcalá	2021	Isalo III Formation (Middle Jurassic, Bajocian to Bathonian)	Madagascar (Boeny)	The oldest known turiasaur	
Nasutoceratops	Scott D. Sampson; Eric K. Lund; Mark A. Loewen; Andrew A. Farke; Katherine E. Clayton	2013	Kaiparowits Formation (Late Cretaceous, Campanian)	United States (Utah)	Possessed an enlarged nasal cavity and two long, curving horns similar to those of modern cattle	
Natovenator	Sungjin Lee; Yuong-Nam Lee; Philip J. Currie; Robin Sissons; Jin-Young Park; Su-Hwan Kim; Rinchen Barsbold; = Khishigjav Tsogtbaatar	2022	Baruungoyot Formation (Late Cretaceous, Maastrichtian)	Mongolia (Ömnögovi)	Had a streamlined body and a long, toothed snout, convergently similar to several groups of aquatic vertebrates	
Navajoceratops	Denver W. Fowler; Elizabeth A. Freedman Fowler	2020	Kirtland Formation (Late Cretaceous, Campanian)	United States (New Mexico)	Possessed a distinctive notch at the very top of its frill, similar to its potential ancestor Pentaceratops	
Navajodactylus	Robert M. Sullivan; Denver W. Fowler	2011	Kirtland Formation (Late Cretaceous, Campanian)	United States (New Mexico)	Some specimens assigned to this genus actually belonged to Cryodrakon	
Navaornis	Luis M. Chiappe: Guillermo Navalón; Agustín G. Martinelli; Ismar S. Carvalho; Rodrigo M. Santucci; Yun-Hsin Wu; Daniel J. Field	2024	Adamantina Formation (Late Cretaceous, Coniacian to Maastrichtian)	Brazil (São Paulo)	The first toothless enantiornithean from South America, known from a three-dimensionally preserved skull	
Nebulasaurus	Lida Xing; Tetsuto Miyashita; Philip J. Currie; Hailu You; Jianping Zhang; Zhiming Dong	2015	Zhanghe Formation (Middle Jurassic, Aalenian to Callovian)	China (Yunnan)	Only known from a single braincase but it is enough to tell that it was related to Spinophorosaurus	
Nedcolbertia	James I. Kirkland; Brooks B. Britt; Christopher H. Whittle; Scott K. Madsen; Donald L. Burge	1998	Cedar Mountain Formation (Early Cretaceous, Berriasian to Valanginian)	United States (Utah)	The specific name, justinhofmanni, honors a six-year-old schoolboy who won a contest to have a dinosaur named after him	
Nedoceratops	Andrey S. Ukrainsky	2007	Lance Formation (Late Cretaceous, Maastrichtian)	United States (Wyoming)	Due to its lack of a nasal horn, it has been considered a valid genus, but it may simply be an unusual specimen of Triceratops	
Neimengornis	Junyou Wang; Xuri Wang; Bin Guo; Ai Kang; Feimin Ma; Shubin Ju	2021	Jiufotang Formation (Early Cretaceous, Aptian)	China (Liaoning)	Had unusually short metacarpals	
Neimongosaurus	Xiaohong Zhang; Xing Xu; Xijin Zhao; Paul Sereno; Xuewen Kuang; Lin Tan	2001	Iren Dabasu Formation (Late Cretaceous, Turonian to Maastrichtian)	China (Inner Mongolia)	Could extend its arms considerably forwards due to the structure of its shoulder joints	
Nemegtomaia	Junchang Lü; Yukimitsu Tomida; Yoichi Azuma; Zhiming Dong; Yuong-Nam Lee	2005	Nemegt Formation (Late Cretaceous, Maastrichtian)	Mongolia (Ömnögovi)	One specimen preserves traces of damage by skin beetles	
Nemegtonykus	Sungjin Lee; Jin-Young Park; Yuong-Nam Lee; Su-Hwan Kim; Junchang Lü; Rinchen Barsbold; Khishigjav Tsogtbaatar	2019	Nemegt Formation (Late Cretaceous, Maastrichtian)	Mongolia (Ömnögovi)	The second alvarezsaurid named from the Nemegt Formation	
Nemegtosaurus	Aleksander Nowiński	1971	Nemegt Formation (Late Cretaceous, Maastrichtian)	Mongolia (Ömnögovi)	Had a long, low skull similar in proportions to those of diplodocoids	
Nemicolopterus	Xiaolin Wang; Alexander W. A. Kellner; Zhonghe Zhou; Diogenes A. Campos	2008	Jiufotang Formation (Early Cretaceous, Aptian)	China (Liaoning)	Most likely a hatchling of a known sinopterine genus	
Neobohaiornis	Caizhi Shen; Alexander D. Clark; Hui Fang; Shaokun Chen; Hongxia Jiang; Qiang Ji; Jingmai K. O'Connor	2024	Jiufotang Formation (Early Cretaceous, Aptian)	China (Liaoning)	Half the size of Bohaiornis	
Neogaeornis	Kálmán Lambrecht	1929	Quiriquina Formation (Late Cretaceous, Maastrichtian)	Chile (Biobío)	Has been considered a primitive loon	
Neosodon	G. de la Moussaye	1885	Sables et Grès à Trigonia gibbosa (Late Jurassic, Tithonian)	France (Hauts-de-France)	No species are assigned to this genus	
Neovenator	Stephen Hutt; David M. Martill; Michael J. Barker	1996	Wessex Formation (Early Cretaceous, Barremian)	England (Isle of Wight)	Had a complex series of neurovascular canals lining its snout	
Nesodactylus	Edwin H. Colbert	1969	Jagua Formation (Late Jurassic, Oxfordian)	Cuba (Pinar del Río)	The first pterosaur found in Cuba	
Neuquenornis	Luis M. Chiappe; Jorge O. Calvo	1994	Bajo de la Carpa Formation (Late Cretaceous, Santonian)	Argentina (Neuquén)	Possessed long wings and a reverse hallux, indicating good flight and perching abilities	
Neuquenraptor	Fernando E. Novas; Diego Pol	2005	Portezuelo Formation (Late Cretaceous, Turonian to Coniacian)	Argentina (Neuquén)	Potentially synonymous with Unenlagia	
Neuquensaurus	Jaime E. Powell	1992	Anacleto Formation (Late Cretaceous, Campanian)	Argentina (Neuquén; Río Negro*)	One of the smallest known titanosaurs	
Nevadadromeus	Joshua W. Bonde; Rebecca L. Hall; Laurel J. Krumenacker; David J. Varricchio	2023	Willow Tank Formation (Late Cretaceous, Cenomanian)	United States (Nevada)	The first non-avian dinosaur described from Nevada	
Ngwevu	Kimberley E.J. Chapelle; Paul M. Barrett; Jennifer Botha; Jonah N. Choiniere	2019	Clarens Formation (Early Jurassic, Pliensbachian to Toarcian)	South Africa (Free State)	Known from a skull originally assigned to Massospondylus, but was assigned to its own genus based on its unique proportions	
Nhandumirim	Júlio C. A. Marsola; Jonathas S. Bittencourt; Richard J. Butler; Átila A. S. Da Rosa; Juliana M. Sayão; Max C. Langer	2018	Candelária Sequence (Late Triassic, Carnian)	Brazil (Rio Grande do Sul)	Originally described as a theropod but has since been reinterpreted as a sauropodomorph	
Nicorhynchus	Borja Holgado; Rodrigo V. Pêgas	2020	Cambridge Greensand (Early Cretaceous, Albian)*; Ifezouane Formation (Early Cretaceous to Late Cretaceous, Albian to Cenomanian)	England (Cambridgeshire*); Morocco (Drâa-Tafilalet)	Named for two species originally assigned to Coloborhynchus	
Niebla	Alexis M. Aranciaga Rolando; Mauricio A. Cerroni; Jordi A. García Marsà; Federico L. Agnolín; Matías J. Motta; Sebastián Rozadilla; Federico Brissón-Eglí; Fernando E. Novas	2021	Allen Formation (Late Cretaceous, Maastrichtian)	Argentina (Río Negro)	Had a uniquely built scapulocoracoid very similar to that of Carnotaurus	
Nigersaurus	Paul C. Sereno; Allison L. Beck; Didier B. Dutheil; Hans C. E. Larsson; Gabrielle H. Lyon; Bourahima Moussa; Rudyard W. Sadleir; Christian A. Sidor; David J. Varricchio; Gregory P. Wilson; Jeffrey A. Wilson	1999	Elrhaz Formation (Early Cretaceous, Barremian to Albian)	Niger (Agadez)	All of its teeth were at the front of its jaws, which were wider than the rest of its skull, an adaptation to low browsing	
Ningchengopterus	Junchang Lü	2009	Yixian Formation (Early Cretaceous, Barremian)	China (Inner Mongolia)	Known from only a baby specimen with adaptations for piscivory	
Ningyuansaurus	Qiang Ji; Junchang Lü; Xuefang Wei; Xuri Wang	2012	Yixian Formation (Early Cretaceous, Barremian)	China (Liaoning)	Preserves small oval-shaped structures in its stomach region which may be seeds	
Ninjatitan	Pablo A. Gallina; Juan I. Canale; José L. Carballido	2021	Bajada Colorada Formation (Early Cretaceous, Berriasian to Valanginian)	Argentina (Neuquén)	The oldest known titanosaur	
Niobrarasaurus	Kenneth Carpenter; David Dilkes; David B. Weishampel	1995	Niobrara Formation (Late Cretaceous, Coniacian to Campanian)	United States (Kansas)	Originally mistakenly believed to have been aquatic	
Nipponopterus	Xuanyu Zhou: Naoki Ikegami; Rodrigo V. Pêgas; Toru Yoshinaga; Takahiro Sato; Toshifumi Mukunoki; Jun Otani; Yoshitsugu Kobayashi	2025	Mifune Group (Late Cretaceous, Turonian to Coniacian)	Japan (Kumamoto)	The first pterosaur named from Japan	
Nipponosaurus	Takumi Nagao	1936	Yezo Group (Late Cretaceous, Santonian to Campanian)	Russia (Sakhalin)	Found on territory owned by Japan in 1936 but later annexed by Russia	
Noasaurus	José F. Bonaparte; Jaime E. Powell	1980	Lecho Formation (Late Cretaceous, Maastrichtian)	Argentina (Salta)	Originally mistakenly believed to have possessed a dromaeosaurid-like sickle claw	
Nodocephalosaurus	Robert M. Sullivan	1999	Kirtland Formation (Late Cretaceous, Campanian)	United States (New Mexico)	Closely related to Asian ankylosaurids	
Nodosaurus	Othniel C. Marsh	1889	Frontier Formation (Late Cretaceous, Cenomanian to Coniacian)	United States (Wyoming)	Its armor included banded dermal plates interspersed by bony nodules	
Noguerornis	Antoni Lacasa Ruiz	1989	La Pedrera de Rúbies Formation (Early Cretaceous, Berriasian to Barremian)	Spain (Catalonia)	Preserves impressions of a propatagium, a skin flap on the shoulder which forms part of a wing	
Nomingia	Rinchen Barsbold; Halszka Osmólska; Mahito Watabe; Philip J. Currie; Khishigjav Tsogtbaatar	2000	Nemegt Formation (Late Cretaceous, Maastrichtian)	Mongolia (Ömnögovi)	One of the first non-avian dinosaurs found with a pygostyle	
Nopcsaspondylus	Sebastián Apesteguía	2007	Candeleros Formation (Late Cretaceous, Cenomanian)	Argentina (Neuquén)	Named from a single, lost vertebra	
Noripterus	Zhongjian Yang	1973	Lianmuqin Formation (Early Cretaceous, Aptian to Albian)*; Shengjinkou Formation (Early Cretaceous, Valanginian); Tsagaantsav Formation (Early Cretaceous, Hauterivian to Barremian)	China (Xinjiang*); Mongolia (Uvs)	Was well-adapted to terrestriality	
Normanniasaurus	Jean Le Loeuff; Suravech Suteethorn; Eric Buffetaut	2013	Poudingue Ferrugineux (Early Cretaceous, Albian)	France (Normandy)	Represents a European radiation of basal titanosaurs	
Normannognathus	Eric Buffetaut; Jean-Jacques LePage; Gilles LePage	1998	Argiles d'Octeville (Late Jurassic, Kimmeridgian)	France (Normandy)	A monofenestratan of uncertain phylogenetic position	
Notatesseraeraptor	Marion Zahner; Winand Brinkmann	2019	Klettgau Formation (Late Triassic, Carnian to Rhaetian)	Switzerland (Aargau)	Combines features of different groups of basal theropods	
Nothronychus	James I. Kirkland; Douglas G. Wolfe	2001	Moreno Hill Formation (Late Cretaceous, Turonian to Coniacian)*; Tropic Shale (Late Cretaceous, Cenomanian to Turonian)	United States (New Mexico; Utah*)	Would have lived in the marshes and swamps along the Turonian shoreline	
Notoceratops	Augusto Tapia	1919	Lago Colhué Huapí Formation (Late Cretaceous, Campanian to Maastrichtian)	Argentina (Chubut)	Originally described as a ceratopsian but this identity is today doubted	
Notocolossus	Bernardo J. González Riga; Matthew C. Lamanna; Leonardo D. Ortíz David; Jorge O. Calvo; Juan P. Coria	2016	Plottier Formation (Late Cretaceous, Coniacian to Santonian)	Argentina (Mendoza)	Unusually for a sauropod, its unguals were truncated	
Notohypsilophodon	Rubén D. F. Martínez	1998	Bajo Barreal Formation (Late Cretaceous, Cenomanian to Turonian)	Argentina (Chubut)	Only known from a juvenile skeleton without the skull	
Novacaesareala	D.C. Parris; S. Hope	2002	Hornerstown Formation (Late Cretaceous to Paleocene, Maastrichtian to Danian)	United States (New Jersey)	May have been the largest known tropicbird	
Nqwebasaurus	William J. de Klerk; Catherine A. Forster; Scott D. Sampson; Anusuya Chinsamy-Turan; Callum F. Ross	2000	Kirkwood Formation (Early Cretaceous, Berriasian to Hauterivian)	South Africa (Eastern Cape)	The first non-avian coelurosaur named from mainland Africa	
Nullotitan	Fernando E. Novas; Federico L. Agnolín; Sebastián Rozadilla; Alexis Mauro Aranciaga Rolando; Federico Brissón-Eglí; Matías J. Motta; Mauricio Cerroni; Martín D/ Ezcurra; Agustín G. Martinelli; Julia S. D'Angelo; Gerardo Alvarez-Herrera; Adriel R. Gentil; Sergio Bogan; Nicolás R. Chimento; Jordi A. García Marsà; Gastón Lo Coco; Sergio E. Miquel; Fátima F. Brito; Ezequiel I. Vera; Valeria S. Perez Loinaze; Mariela S. Fernández; Leonardo Salgado	2019	Chorillo Formation (Late Cretaceous, Maastrichtian)	Argentina (Santa Cruz)	Would have niche-partitioned with smaller ornithopods	
Nurhachius	Xiaolin Wang; Alexander W. A. Kellner; Zhonghe Zhou; Diogenes A. Campos	2005	Jiufotang Formation (Early Cretaceous, Aptian)*; Yixian Formation (Early Cretaceous, Barremian)	China (Liaoning)	Its teeth were extremely similar to those of Istiodactylus	
Nuthetes	Richard Owen	1854	Lulworth Formation (Early Cretaceous, Berriasian)	England (Dorset)	Only known from jaws and teeth traditionally identified as belonging to a dromaeosaurid, but it might be a proceratosaurid instead	
Nyasasaurus	Sterling J. Nesbitt; Paul M. Barrett; Sarah Werning; Christian A. Sidor; Alan J. Charig	2013	Manda Formation (Middle Triassic to Late Triassic, Anisian to Carnian)	Tanzania (Ruvuma)	Described as the oldest known dinosaur, but its age and classification have been questioned	
Nyctosaurus	Othniel C. Marsh	1876	Niobrara Formation (Late Cretaceous, Coniacian to Campanian)	United States (Kansas)	Some specimens show an enlarged, two-pronged, antler-like crest	
Oblitosaurus	Sergio Sánchez-Fenollosa; Francisco J. Verdú; Alberto Cobos	2023	Villar del Arzobispo Formation (Late Jurassic to Early Cretaceous, Tithonian to Berriasian)	Spain (Aragon)	The largest ornithopod known from the Late Jurassic of Europe	
Oceanotitan	Pedro Mocho; Rafael Royo-Torres; Francisco Ortega	2019	Lourinhã Formation (Late Jurassic, Kimmeridgian)	Portugal (Lisbon)	Potentially the oldest known somphospondylian	
Ohmdenosaurus	Rupert Wild	1978	Posidonia Shale (Early Jurassic, Toarcian)	Germany (Baden-Württemberg)	Its holotype was misidentified as a plesiosaur before its formal naming	
Ojoceratops	Robert M. Sullivan; Spencer G. Lucas	2010	Ojo Alamo Formation (Late Cretaceous, Maastrichtian)	United States (New Mexico)	May be ancestral to Triceratops or a synonym of Eotriceratops	
Ojoraptorsaurus	Robert M. Sullivan; Steven E. Jasinski; Mark P.A. Van Tomme	2011	Ojo Alamo Formation (Late Cretaceous, Maastrichtian)	United States (New Mexico)	Only known from an incomplete pair of pubic bones	
Oksoko	Gregory F. Funston; Tsogtbaatar Chinzorig; Khishigjav Tsogtbaatar; Yoshitsugu Kobayashi; Corwin Sullivan; Philip J. Currie	2020	Nemegt Formation (Late Cretaceous, Maastrichtian)	Mongolia (Ömnögovi)	Its third finger was so greatly reduced that it was functionally didactyl	
Olorotitan	Pascal Godefroit; Yuri Bolotsky; Vladimir Alifanov	2003	Udurchukan Formation (Late Cretaceous, Maastrichtian)	Russia (Amur Oblast)	Had a broad, hatchet-shaped crest	
Omeisaurus	Zhongjian Yang	1939	Shangshaximiao Formation (Late Jurassic, Oxfordian to Tithonian); Xiashaximiao Formation (Middle Jurassic to Late Jurassic, Bathonian to Oxfordian)*	China (Chongqing; Sichuan*)	Members of this genus are characterized by extremely elongated necks	
Omnivoropteryx	Stephen A. Czerkas; Qiang Ji	2002	Jiufotang Formation (Early Cretaceous, Aptian)	China (Liaoning)	May be a synonym of Sapeornis	
Ondogurvel	Alexander O. Averianov; Alexey V. Lopatin	2022	Baruungoyot Formation (Late Cretaceous, Maastrichtian)	Mongolia (Ömnögovi)	Known from well-preserved remains of the hands and feet	
Oohkotokia	Paul Penkalski	2014	Two Medicine Formation (Late Cretaceous, Campanian)	United States (Montana)	Potentially a synonym of Scolosaurus	
Opisthocoelicaudia	Magdalena Borsuk-Białynicka	1977	Nemegt Formation (Late Cretaceous, Maastrichtian)	Mongolia (Ömnögovi)	Walked on its metacarpals due to its complete lack of phalanges	
Oplosaurus	Paul Gervais	1852	Wessex Formation (Early Cretaceous, Berriasian to Barremian)	England (Isle of Wight)	The holotype tooth was pointed, which led to its misidentification as a carnivorous reptile	
Ordosipterus	Shu-An Ji	2020	Luohandong Formation (Early Cretaceous, Aptian to Albian)	China (Inner Mongolia)	Had smaller teeth and broader jaws compared to other dsungaripterids	
Orienantius	Di Liu; Luis M. Chiappe; Yuguang Zhang; F.J. Serrano; Qingjin Meng	2019	Huajiying Formation (Early Cretaceous, Hauterivian)	China (Hebei)	Many soft tissue details of specimens from this genus were revealed by UV light	
Orientognathus	Junchang Lü; Hanyong Pu; Li Xu; Xuefang Wei; Huali Chang; Martin Kundrát	2015	Tuchengzi Formation (Late Jurassic, Tithonian)	China (Liaoning)	One of the youngest Jurassic Chinese pterosaurs	
Orkoraptor	Fernando E. Novas; Martín D. Ezcurra; Agustina Lecuona	2008	Cerro Fortaleza Formation (Late Cretaceous, Campanian to Maastrichtian)	Argentina (Santa Cruz)	Had highly specialized dentition similar to that of maniraptorans	
Ornatops	Andrew T. McDonald; Douglas G. Wolfe; Elizabeth A. Freedman Fowler; Terry A. Gates	2021	Menefee Formation (Late Cretaceous, Campanian)	United States (New Mexico)	Preserves a pair of bumps on its skull which may have anchored a crest	
Ornithocheirus	Harry G. Seeley	1869	Cambridge Greensand (Early Cretaceous, Albian)	England (Cambridgeshire)	A historical "wastebasket taxon" which many toothed pterosaurs have historically been assigned to	
Ornithodesmus	Harry G. Seeley	1887	Wessex Formation (Early Cretaceous, Berriasian to Barremian)	England (Isle of Wight)	Historically conflated with the remains of the pterosaur Istiodactylus	
Ornitholestes	Henry F. Osborn	1903	Morrison Formation (Late Jurassic, Kimmeridgian)	United States (Wyoming)	May have possessed a sickle claw similar to those of dromaeosaurids	
Ornithomimoides	Friedrich von Huene; Charles A. Matley	1933	Lameta Formation (Late Cretaceous, Maastrichtian)	India (Madhya Pradesh)	Two species have been named, both from isolated vertebrae	
Ornithomimus	Othniel C. Marsh	1890	Denver Formation (Late Cretaceous, Maastrichtian)*; Horseshoe Canyon Formation (Late Cretaceous, Campanian to Maastrichtian)	Canada (Alberta); United States (Colorado*)	One referred specimen preserves impressions of ostrich-like feathers covering most of its body	
Ornithopsis	Harry G. Seeley	1870	Wealden Group (Early Cretaceous, Berriasian to Aptian)	England (West Sussex)	Originally believed to be an intermediate form between birds, pterosaurs, and dinosaurs	
Ornithostoma	Harry G. Seeley	1871	Cambridge Greensand (Early Cretaceous, Albian)	England (Cambridgeshire)	Has been considered to be related to Pteranodon and azhdarchoids	
Ornithotarsus	Edward D. Cope	1869	Merchantville Formation (Late Cretaceous, Santonian to Campanian)	United States (New Jersey)	May be a synonym of Hadrosaurus, but this cannot be confirmed	
Orodromeus	John R. Horner; David B. Weishampel	1988	Two Medicine Formation (Late Cretaceous, Campanian)	United States (Montana)	Eggs considered to belong to this taxon may have actually come from a troodontid	
Orosaurus	Thomas H. Huxley	1867	Lower Elliot Formation (Late Triassic, Norian)	South Africa (Eastern Cape)	Probably a synonym of Euskelosaurus	
Orthogoniosaurus	Hem Chandra Das Gupta	1931	Lameta Formation (Late Cretaceous, Maastrichtian)	India (Madhya Pradesh)	Only known from a single, fragmentary tooth	
Orthomerus	Harry G. Seeley	1883	Maastricht Formation (Late Cretaceous, Maastrichtian)	Netherlands (Limburg)	Potentially dubious and undiagnostic	
Oryctodromeus	David J. Varricchio; Anthony J. Martin; Yoshihiro Katsura	2007	Blackleaf Formation (Early Cretaceous to Late Cretaceous, Albian to Cenomanian)	United States (Montana)	Several specimens have been preserved in burrows	
Osmakasaurus	Andrew T. McDonald	2011	Lakota Formation (Early Cretaceous, Berriasian to Barremian)	United States (South Dakota)	Originally named as a species of Camptosaurus	
Ostafrikasaurus	Eric Buffetaut	2013	Tendaguru Formation (Late Jurassic, Tithonian)	Tanzania (Lindi)	Described from a single tooth as an early spinosaurid, but ceratosaurid affinities have also been proposed	
Ostromia	Christian Foth; Oliver W. M. Rauhut	2017	Painten Formation (Late Jurassic, Tithonian)	Germany (Bavaria)	Considered a small pterosaur until it was redescribed as a specimen of Archaeopteryx in 1970	
Otogopterus	Shu-An Ji; Lifu Zhang	2020	Luohandong Formation (Early Cretaceous, Aptian to Albian)	China (Inner Mongolia)	Unlike other ctenochasmatids, its tooth sockets are all the same size	
Otogornis	Lianhai Hou	1994	Jingchuan Formation (Early Cretaceous, Barremian)	China (Inner Mongolia)	Once believed to be a close relative of Ambiortus	
Ouranosaurus	Philippe Taquet	1976	Elrhaz Formation (Early Cretaceous, Barremian to Albian)	Niger (Agadez)	Had long neural spines that projected from its vertebrae, which may have supported a sail or hump in life	
Overoraptor	Matías J. Motta; Federico L. Agnolín; Federico Brissón Eglí; Fernando E. Novas	2020	Huincul Formation (Late Cretaceous, Cenomanian to Turonian)	Argentina (Río Negro)	Shows adaptations for both flight and cursoriality	
Overosaurus	Rodolfo A. Coria; Leonardo S. Filippi; Luis M. Chiappe; Rodolfo García; Andrea B. Arcucci	2013	Bajo de la Carpa Formation (Late Cretaceous, Santonian)	Argentina (Neuquén)	One of the smallest known aeolosaurins	
Oviraptor	Henry F. Osborn	1924	Djadokhta Formation (Late Cretaceous, Campanian)	Mongolia (Ömnögovi)	Originally mistakenly thought to be an egg-eater	
Owenodon	Peter M. Galton	2009	Lulworth Formation (Early Cretaceous, Berriasian)	England (Dorset)	Has been assigned to Iguanodon and Camptosaurus before it received its own genus	
Oxalaia	Alexander W. A. Kellner; Sergio A. K. de Azevedo; Elaine B. Machado; Luciana B. de Carvalho; Deise D.R. Henriques	2011	Alcântara Formation (Late Cretaceous, Cenomanian)	Brazil (Maranhão)	Potentially a junior synonym of Spinosaurus	
Ozraptor	John A. Long; Ralph E. Molnar	1998	Colalura Sandstone (Middle Jurassic, Bajocian)	Australia (Western Australia)	Potentially the oldest known abelisauroid	

== See also ==
- List of Mesozoic bird-line archosaur genera (A–B)
- List of Mesozoic bird-line archosaur genera (C–F)
- List of Mesozoic bird-line archosaur genera (G–K)
- List of Mesozoic bird-line archosaur genera (P–S)
- List of Mesozoic bird-line archosaur genera (T–Z)
