= Otogopterus =

Otogopterus Temporal range: Early Cretaceous, 120–110 Ma

Scientific classification
- Kingdom: Animalia
- Phylum: Chordata
- Class: Reptilia
- Order: †Pterosauria
- Suborder: †Pterodactyloidea
- Family: †Ctenochasmatidae
- Genus: †Otogopterus; Ji & Zhang, 2020

Type species
- †Otogopterus haoae Ji & Zhang, 2020

Genus of ctenochasmatid pterosaur from the Early Cretaceous

Otogopterus (meaning "Otog Banner wing") is a genus of pterosaur in the family Ctenochasmatidae, known from Early Cretaceous rocks in the Ordos region of Inner Mongolia, China (Luohandong Formation). It contains one species, O. haoae, named in 2020 by Ji Shu'an and Zhang Lifu. O. haoae is known from a partial lower jaw (the mandibular symphysis), which is long and straight, and bears a ridge on each side that divides the outer surface of the jaw. After Ordosipterus, Otogopterus is the second pterosaur known from the Ordos region.

== Discovery and naming ==
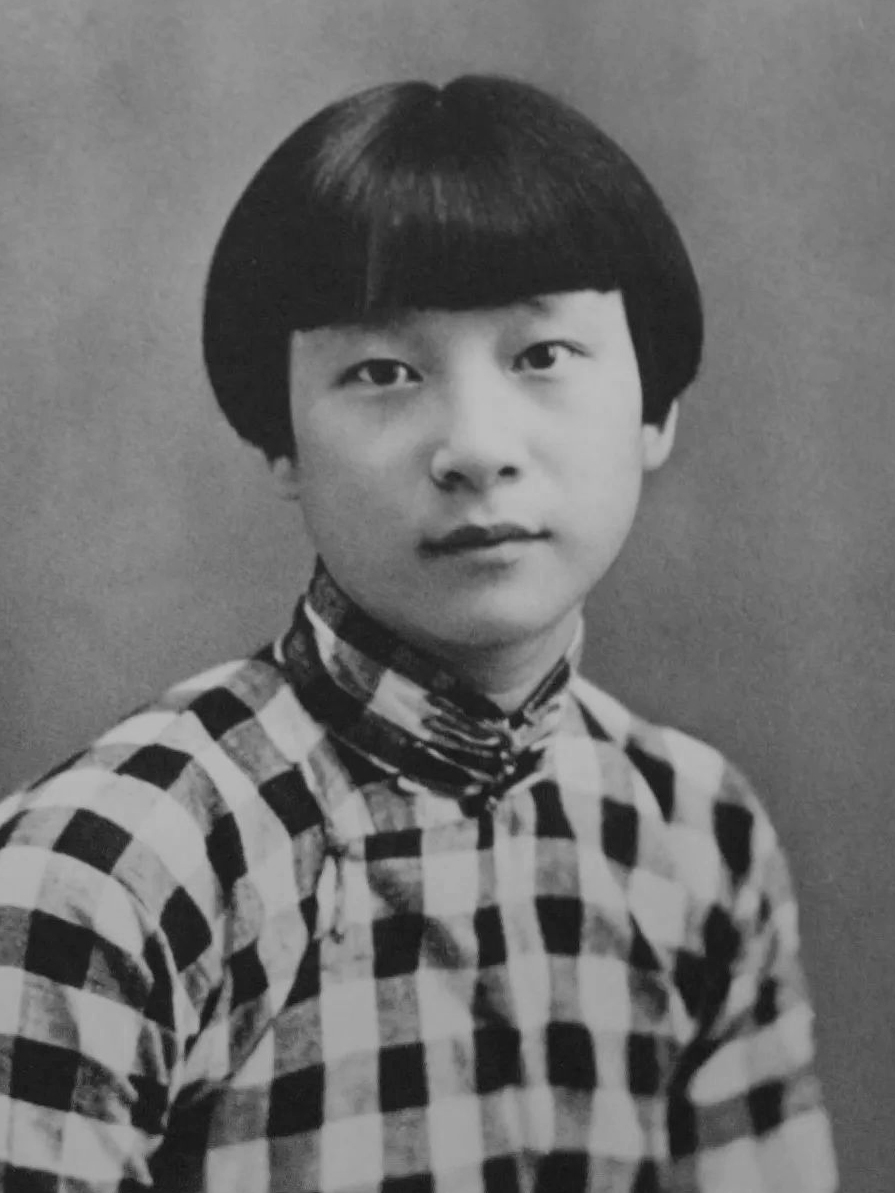
Hao Yichun, the namesake of the species O. haoae

The Ordos Basin of Inner Mongolia, China is considered an important record of the Early Cretaceous fauna of the country. During the 1980s, the Sino-Canadian Dinosaur Project carried out expeditions into the region and published numerous studies on dinosaurs and turtles found by the project. In addition to these remains, a 1993 study referenced the existence of pterosaurs fossils from the region. Dedicated research on these pterosaurs, however, failed to materialize, leaving an absence of definitive evidence of their presence. Years later, Ji Shu-an would discover new pterosaur fossils in the region. The first of these was a jawbone that was named by Ji in 2020 as Ordosipterus. The second was discovered near Zhaoshao Village, Mukainaoer Town; though little of the geologic strata was exposed and a lack of geologic landmarks was noted at the locality, the site is thought to belong to the middle section of the Luohandong Formation of the Zhidan Group.

Later in November of 2020, the second jaw was named by Ji and Zhang Lifu as the new genus and species Otogopterus haoae. The generic name Otogopterus refers to the Otog Banner locality, where it was discovered, while the specific name haoae honours palaeontologist Hao Yichun, who contributed greatly to research of the stratigraphy of the region. The name bearing and only known specimen is a 9.8 centimetres (3.9 in) long dentary bone. It was identified as a member of the family Ctenochasmatidae.

== Description ==
Ctenochasmatid pterosaurs such as Otogopterus are known for their long snouts and elongate teeth arranged in a wide variety of different ways across various taxa. Otogopterus in particular possesses a very thin, elongate snout that is extraordinarily straight along the preserved portion. A unique combination of features distinguishes the taxon from other ctenochasmids. One of the most overt features are the ridges along its dentary. The sides of the bone each possess a prominent ridge that separates the edges into an upper and lower portion. The lower portions come together into an additional large ridge along the central bottom edge of the bone. The upper portion possessed at least 23 pairs of tooth sockets. Each socket was circular, with the distance between them equal to half a socket in width and three sockets per 1 centimetre (0.39 in) along the jaw in a straight line. Unlike in some other ctenochasmids such as Gnathosaurus, the tooth sockets do not appear to change in size along the length of the jaw. Though the teeth themselves are unknown, the placement and inner orientation of the sockets indicate they would have pointed forward and outward.

== Palaeoecology ==
The environment in which the only known specimen of Otogopterus was preserved is thought to have characterized by braided rivers.
