= Eotomistoma =

Eotomistoma Temporal range: Early Cretaceous, ~120–110 Ma

Scientific classification
- Kingdom: Animalia
- Phylum: Chordata
- Class: Reptilia
- Clade: Pseudosuchia
- Clade: Crocodylomorpha
- Clade: Crocodyliformes
- Genus: †Eotomistoma; Young, 1964

Type species
- †Eotomistoma multidentata Young, 1964

Extinct genus of reptiles

Eotomistoma is a dubious genus of crocodyliform from the Lower Cretaceous of China.

== History ==
Eotomistoma was named by Chung-Chien Young in 1964 based on two pieces of the snout. Young assigned it to the Tomistominae. However, other researchers, such as Eric Buffetaut, were skeptical of Young's interpretation, and in 1981 Denise Sigogneau-Russell re-studied it and determined the specimen was a chimera of a crocodylian and a choristodere. Sigogneau-Russell named the choristodere fossil Ikechosaurus. The remaining snout fragment, still the holotype of Eotomistoma, is now considered to be an indeterminate crocodyliform.

== Paleoecology ==
Eotomistoma is known from the Lower Cretaceous Luohandong Formation. It was a contemporary of the choristodere Ikechosaurus and the crocodyliforms Theriosuchus and Shantungosuchus.
