= Hao Yichun =

Chinese paleontologist (1920–2001)

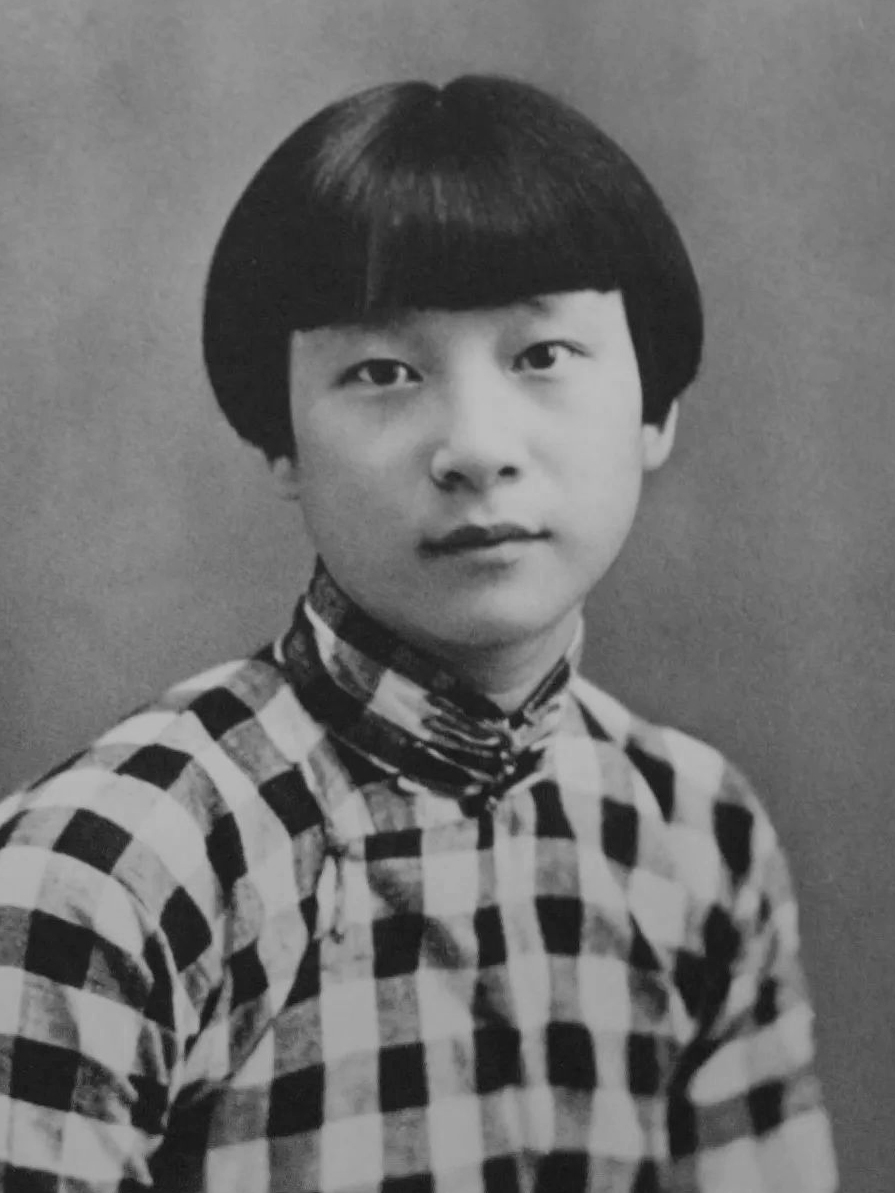
- Hao in her early years
- Born: 1920
- Died: June 13, 2001 (aged 80); Xianning City, Hubei Province
- Occupation: Palaeontologist

Hao Yichun (Note: In this Chinese name, the family name is Hao.) (Chinese: 郝诒纯; 1920–2001) was a Chinese paleontologist and a member of the Chinese Communist Party. She is known as a pioneer in bringing paleontology to China, co-authoring the first Chinese textbooks in paleontology and micropaleontology. She made significant contributions to stratigraphy, petroleum exploration, and palaeoceanography.

== Life ==
Hao was born in the Wuchang District of Hubei Province, China. She was first enrolled in the history department of National Southwestern Associated University, China, but eventually transferred to the geology, climate, and geography department, graduating in 1943. She went on to do postgraduate studies at Tsinghua University, graduating in 1946. From 1946 to 1952, she taught at Beijing University, later becoming an associate professor at the Beijing Geological Institute and the Beijing Branch of Wuhan Geological Institute. In 1980, she became an academician in the Academic Division of Earth Sciences of the Chinese Academy of Sciences.

She died from cancer in Beijing in 2001.

== Research ==
Hao and her research group established the standard stratigraphy for northeast and southwest China. Her work on micropalaeontology, especially Foraminifera, was important to the national exploration and exploitation of marine energy resources. She co-wrote the first Chinese textbook on paleontology with Yang Zunyi and Chen Guoda in 1956.

== Major publications ==
"Paleontology Textbook" (1956) "Cretaceous–Tertiary Ostracods of the Songliao Plain" "Middle Jurassic–Tertiary Strata and Ostracod and Charophyte Fossils of the Minhe Basin, Xining" "Late Cretaceous–Tertiary Strata and Foraminifera of the Western Tarim Basin" "Cretaceous System of China" "Foraminifera"

== Career in the Chinese Communist Party ==
Hao was heavily involved in the Chinese Communist Party, first joining the party in 1936, which was retroactively officially recognized in 1979. Prior to her undergraduate studies, she was part of student movements and organizations, including the Chinese National Liberation Vanguard (Minxian).

She was especially active in the scientist-based Jiusan Society, becoming vice chairperson in 1983. Same year, she was recognized as a National March 8th Red-Banner Holder.

Her history in the party included: member of the Standing Committee of the Chinese People's Political Consultative Conference, member of the Standing Committee of the People's Congress of China, vice chairwoman of the Standing Committee of the People's Congress of Beijing, and vice chairwoman of the Women's Federation of China.

In 1993, commissioned by the Standing Committee of the National People's Congress, she represented China in the Asian Forum of Parliamentarians on Population and Development of the United Nations Population Fund (AFPPD), later becoming the executive vice-chairperson of the AFPPD. Same year, she organized the 10th International Conference on Population and Development in Asia, where she presented a speech on the relationship between activist movements for Chinese women rights and the Chinese population.

== Legacy ==
In 2020, the China University of Geosciences (Beijing) hosted the 100th anniversary memorial conference.
