= Luohandong Formation =

Geologic formation in Inner Mongolia

- Stratigraphic range: Aptian-Albian; ~120–110 Ma
- Type: Geological formation
- Unit of: Zhidan Group

Lithology
- Primary: Sandstone

Location
- Coordinates: 38.9°N 108.1°E
- Approximate paleocoordinates: 39.9°N 110.5°E
- Region: Inner Mongolia
- Country: China
- Extent: Ordos Basin
- Luohandong Formation (China)

The Luohandong Formation is an Early Cretaceous geologic formation of the Ordos Basin in Inner Mongolia, China. The formation was initially dated to the earliest Cretaceous; Valanginian to Barremian, but later dating established an Aptian to Albian age. Dinosaur remains are among the fossils that have been recovered from the formation. Pterosaur fossils have also been recovered from the formation.

== Fossil content ==
=== Vertebrates ===
- Ikechosaurus sunailinae
- Ordosipterus planignathus
- Otogopterus haoae
- Shantungosuchus hangjinensis
- Wuerhosaurus ordosensis
- Ordosemys leios
- Sinemys gamera
- Eotomistoma sp.
- Psittacosaurus sp.
- Sinamia sp.
- Iguanodontidae indet.
- Mammalia indet.
- Neosuchia indet.
- Psittacosauridae indet.
- Pterosauria indet.
- Sauropoda indet.
- Stegosauria indet.

=== Insects ===
- Dataiphis coniferis
- Fuxiaeschna hsiufunia

== See also ==
- List of dinosaur-bearing rock formations
- List of pterosaur-bearing stratigraphic units
