= Sables et Grès à Trigonia gibbosa =

Late Jurassic French geologic formation with Trigonia

- Stratigraphic range: Late Tithonian; ~146 Ma
- Type: Geological formation

Lithology
- Primary: Gravel, sandstone

Location
- Region: Département du Pas-de-Calais
- Country: France

The Sables et Grès à Trigonia gibbosa is a geological formation in northwestern France. It dates back to the Late Jurassic. It is named after Trigonia gibbosa, which can be found in abundance in the formation.

== Vertebrate fauna ==
=== Ornithischians ===
Dinosaurs
Taxa	Presence	Description	Images
Iguanodontia	Indeterminate remains.	Geographically located in Département du Pas-de-Calais, France.	
Nodosauridae	Indeterminate remains.	Geographically located in Département du Pas-de-Calais, France.	
Ornithischia	Possible indeterminate ornithischian remains.	Geographically located in Département du Pas-de-Calais, France.	

=== Saurischians ===
Dinosaurs
Taxa	Presence	Description	Images
Neosodon	Indeterminate remains.	Geographically located in Département du Pas-de-Calais, France.	
Theropoda	Indeterminate remains.	Geographically located in Département du Pas-de-Calais, France.	

== See also ==
- List of dinosaur-bearing rock formations
