= Asian Forum of Parliamentarians on Population and Development =

Regional non-governmental organization

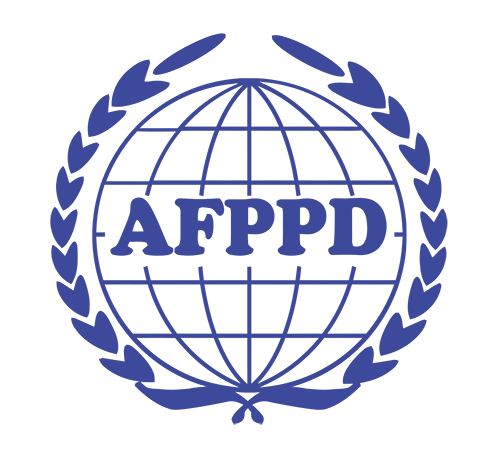
- Abbreviation: AFPPD
- Formation: 1981
- Type: NGO
- Location: Bangkok, Thailand (Secretariat)
- Region served: Asia-Pacific
- Members: 29 National Committees of Parliamentarians on Population and Development
- Website: https://www.afppd.org/

The Asian Forum of Parliamentarians on Population and Development (AFPPD) is a regional non-governmental organization (NGO) that serves as a coordinating body of 30 National Committees of Parliamentarians on Population and Development in Asia-Pacific. The objective of the organization is to strengthen the regional network of parliamentarians who are committed to implementing the population and development agenda, particularly the Programme of Action of the International Conference on Population and Development (ICPD PoA) and the Sustainable Development Goals (SDGs). AFPPD aims to achieve this through capacity building for parliamentarians and National Committees.

== Background ==
With initiative from the United Nations Population Fund (UNFPA), AFPPD was established in 1981 at the Asian Conference of Parliamentarians on Population and Development held in Beijing to promote the involvement of lawmakers in the Asia-Pacific region in addressing population and development issues such as sexual and reproductive health and rights (SRHR), family planning, gender equality, active ageing, youth issues, urbanization, migration and HIV/AIDS. AFPPD envisions a world where demographic changes and population issues are taken into account in planning for sustainable development.

AFPPD aims to realize its vision through parliamentary work by:

- Advocating for and formulating/amending policies and legislation that promote reproductive health and rights, gender equality and women’s empowerment, investing in youth, active ageing, Universal Health Coverage (UHC), and other population and development issues;
- Holding governments accountable for their commitments and implementation;
- Advocating for increased financial resources in these areas.

AFPPD provides capacity development support to its members, facilitating their networking at the national, regional and global levels. The organization is governed by the General Assembly; managed by the Executive Committee; advised by three Standing Committees on its strategic priorities; and supported by the Secretariat located in Bangkok, Thailand. As of April 2016, AFPPD consists of 29 member National Committees of Parliamentarians on Population and Development in Afghanistan, Australia, Bangladesh, Bhutan, Cambodia, China, Cook Islands, India, Indonesia, Iran, Japan, Kazakhstan, Kyrgyzstan, Lao PDR, Malaysia, Maldives, Mongolia, Nepal, New Zealand, Pakistan, Papua New Guinea, Philippines, South Korea, Sri Lanka, Tajikistan, Thailand, Timor-Leste, Tonga, and Vietnam.

AFPPD is the oldest regional parliamentarian forum on population and development. It has been registered as an international nongovernmental organization, with the Ministry of Labour, Government of Thailand, since October 1994. As a recipient of the 2010 UN Population Award, AFPPD has the highest consultative status with the UN Economic and Social Council (ECOSOC).

== Standing Committees ==
=== Standing Committee on Gender Equality and Women's Empowerment ===
The establishment of the Standing Committee’s main purpose is to share knowledge, advocate and exchange experiences among its members to advance gender equality and women’s empowerment across the region. Members of the Standing Committee will be informed of the progress and provide guidance to future plans and gender related activities of the AFPPD. Ms. Angela Warren-Clark (MP, New Zealand and Chairperson of the New Zealand Parliamentary Group on Population and Development) and Hon. Dr. Shirin Sharmin Chaudhury (Speaker of Parliament from Bangladesh) are the current Co-Chairpersons of this Standing Committee.

=== Standing Committee on Investing in Youth ===
Members of this Standing Committee will be expected to examine and advocate issues which affect young people and share policy options and recommendations with other member countries to achieve sustainable human development. Through this joint action, members of the Standing Committee will therefore highlight parliamentarians’ role and responsibilities in safeguarding the rights, needs and aspirations of young people through targeted policies and investments. Hon. Ruhollah Mottafaker Azad (MP, Iran) and Hon. Ms. Dilrabo Mansuri (MP and Vice-Speaker of the lower house of the Parliament, Tajikistan) are the current Co-Chairpersons of this Standing Committee.

=== Standing Committee on Active Ageing ===
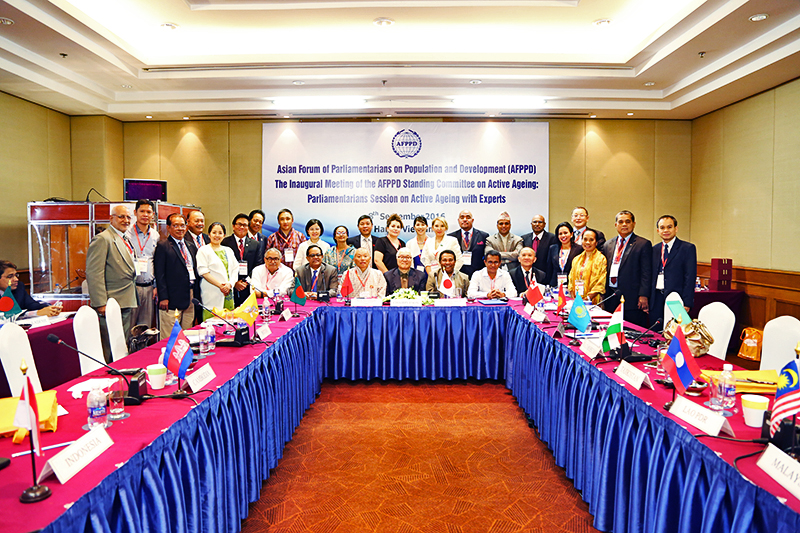
AFPPD Inaugural Standing Committee Meeting on Active Ageing in Hanoi, Vietnam

The Standing Committee on Active Ageing was established with the aim to promote healthy and active ageing, and protect the rights of older persons through policies and legal frameworks. The Standing Committee is expected to provide guidance and lead advocacy efforts on issues related to older persons, which include strengthening social protection, enhancing health care for healthy life expectancy, as well as addressing the specific needs of older women. Hon. Professor Keizo Takemi (MP, Japan and Chairperson of AFPPD) and representative from China China, Vice-chairperson of AFPPD) are the current Co-Chairpersons of this Standing Committee.

== Members ==
- National Committee on Population and Development, National Assembly of Afghanistan
- Australian Parliamentary Group on Population and Development (PGPD)
- Bangladesh Association of Parliamentarians on Population and Development (BAPPD)
- National Committee on Population and Development, National Assembly of Bhutan
- Cambodian Association of Parliamentarians on Population and Development (CAPPD)
- Education, Science, Culture and Public Health Committee (ESCPHC) of the National People's Congress, China
- Parliamentary Group on Population and Sustainable Development, Cook Islands
- Indian Association of Parliamentarians on Population and Development (IAPPD)
- Indonesian Forum of Parliamentarians on Population and Development (IFPPD)
- Iranian Parliamentarians on Population and Development Committee (IRPPDC)
- Japan Parliamentarians Federation for Population (JPFP)
- Parliamentarians' Group on Family and Population, Parliament of Kazakhstan
- National Committee of the Kyrgyzstan on Population and Development (NCKPD)
- Lao Association of Parliamentarians on Population and Development (LAPPD)
- Asian Forum of Parliamentarians on Population and Development (AFPPD), Malaysia
- Maldives Parliamentary Group on Population and Development (MPGPD)
- Mongolian Parliamentarians Group for Population and Development
- National Forum of Parliamentarians on Population and Development, Nepal (NFPPD)
- New Zealand Parliamentarians' Group on Population and Development (NZPPD)
- Pakistan Parliamentarians' Group on Population, Reproductive Health and Development (PPGPRD)
- Papua New Guinea Parliamentary Group for Population and Sustainable Development (PNG PGPSD)
- Philippine Legislators' Committee on Population and Development Foundation, Inc. (PLCPD)
- Korean Parliamentary League on Children, Population and Environment
- Sri Lankan Parliamentary Group on Population and Development (SLPGPD)
- Standing Committee on Social Issues, Family and Health Care, Lower Chamber of the Parliament, Tajikistan
- Senate's Standing Committee on Public Health, Senate of Thailand
- Women's Parliamentary Caucus (GMPTL) and Committee F, National Parliament of Timor-Leste
- Parliamentary Group on Population and Development Committee, Parliament of Tonga
- Vietnam Association of Parliamentarians on Population and Development (VAPPD)

== Activities ==
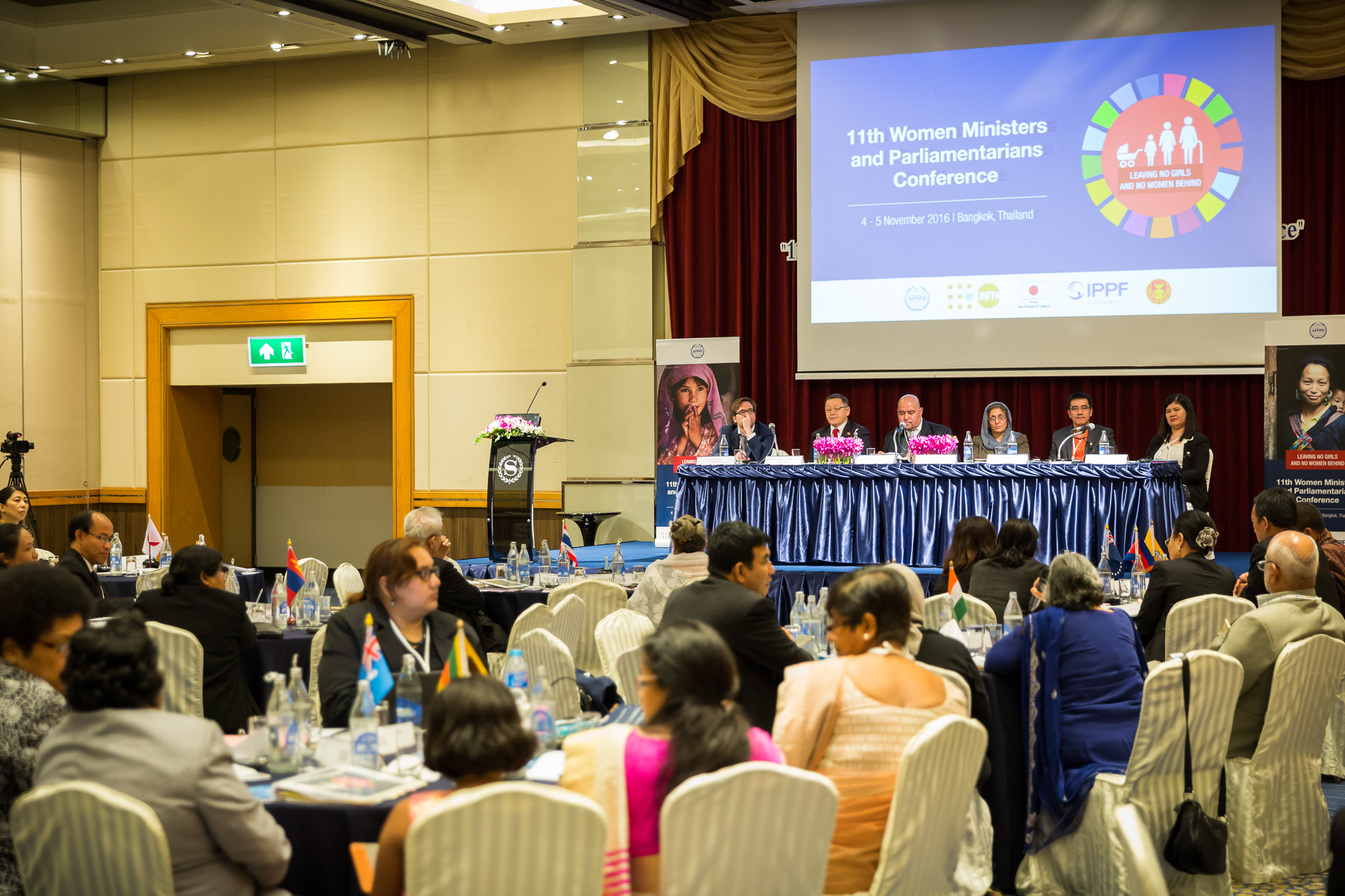
11th Women Ministers and Parliamentarians Conference in Bangkok, Thailand

AFPPD’s activities include the following:

- To establish and promote collaboration among parliamentarians and other elected legislative representatives, the associates of those representatives and institutions in all Asia-Pacific countries for the development, utilization and sharing of data, information, research findings, expertise and experience pertaining to population and development issues;
- To facilitate the dissemination and utilization of information and research, including through print and online resources;
- To facilitate, support and organize events for parliamentarians in order to promote and encourage their involvement in addressing population and development issues;
- To generate and mobilize resources needed to render AFPPD capable of fulfilling its functions and responsibilities on a sustainable basis;
- To encourage and promote the formation of National Committees of parliamentarians to address population and development issues where these bodies are not yet in existence.
