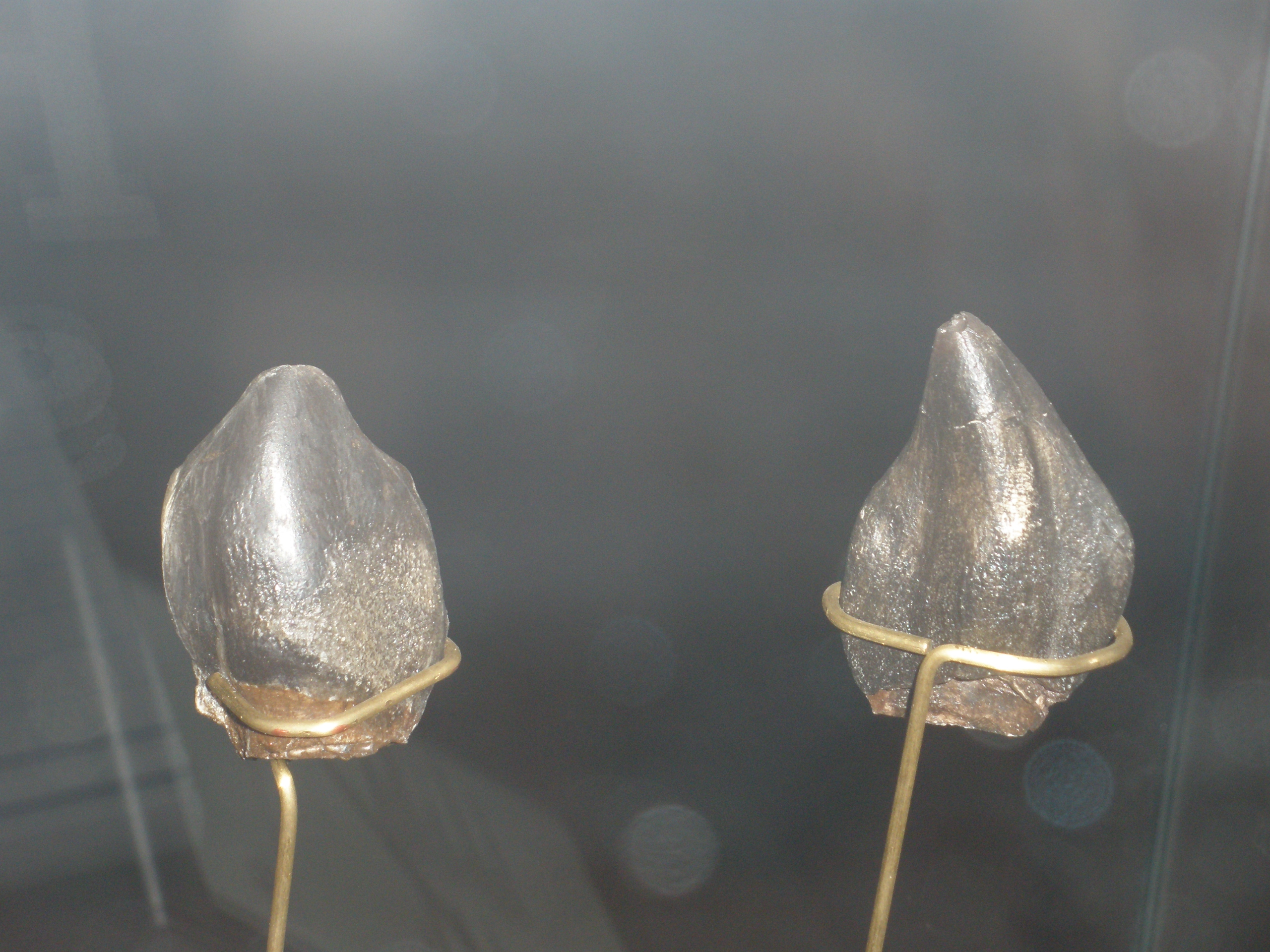
- Teeth assigned to Neosodon.

Scientific classification
- Kingdom: Animalia
- Phylum: Chordata
- Class: Reptilia
- Clade: Dinosauria
- Clade: Saurischia
- Clade: †Sauropodomorpha
- Clade: †Sauropoda
- Genus: †Neosodon; Moussaye, 1885

= Neosodon =

Neosodon Temporal range: Late Tithonian, 146 Ma

Extinct genus of dinosaurs

Neosodon (meaning "new tooth") was a genus of sauropod dinosaur from the late Tithonian-aged (Upper Jurassic) Sables et Gres a Trigonia gibbosa of Pas-de-Calais department, France. It has never been formally given a species name, but is often seen as N. praecursor, which actually comes from a different animal. Often in the past, it had been assigned to the wastebasket taxon Pelorosaurus, but restudy has suggested that it could be related to Turiasaurus, a roughly contemporaneous giant Spanish sauropod. It is only known from six teeth.

== History and taxonomy ==
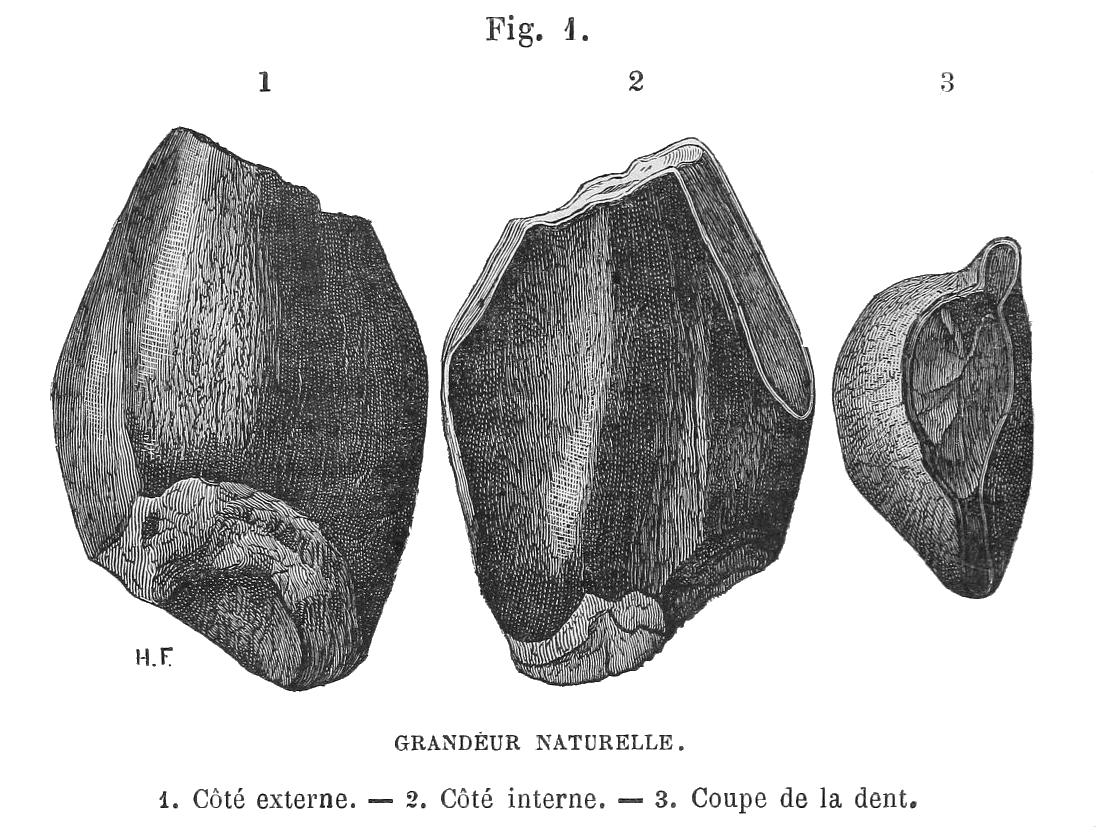
Illustration of the original tooth from Wilmille.

Moussaye named this genus for a large, broken, worn tooth found in Wilmille, near Boulogne-sur-Mer, and neglected to give it a species name. He thought that it belonged to a theropod like Megalosaurus. Since then, five more teeth have been found and assigned to Neosodon.

Sauvage synonymized it with his tooth species Iguanodon praecursor, which by this time had become mixed up with Edward Drinker Cope's roughly contemporaneous American Morrison Formation genus Caulodon (now a synonym of Camarasaurus). However, the two are not based on the same type, as "I". praecursor comes from slightly older rocks: the same unnamed Kimmeridgian formation as Morinosaurus. Earlier reviews (Romer, 1956; Steel, 1970) accepted it as a synonym of Pelorosaurus, and considered it a possible brachiosaurid.

In the 1990s, French researchers published on new camarasaurid bones from the same formation. At first, Buffetaut and Martin (1993) suggested that they belonged to Neosodon praecursor, but Le Loeuff et al. (1996) later rejected this, as Neosodon is based only on several teeth, which did not overlap the new material. The latest review accepted both Neosodon and "Iguanodon" praecursor as dubious sauropods. However, Royo-Torres et al. (2006), in their description of Turiasaurus, noted that this tooth was similar to those of their genus and suggested that it could be a turiasaur.

== Paleobiology ==
The teeth referred to Neosodon are large (60 mm [2.36 in] tall and a cross-section of 35 by 20 mm (1.38 by 0.79 in) in its incomplete state, estimated at 80 mm [3.15 in] tall if complete) and spear-like or spatulate in shape. The owner would have been a large, quadrupedal herbivore.
