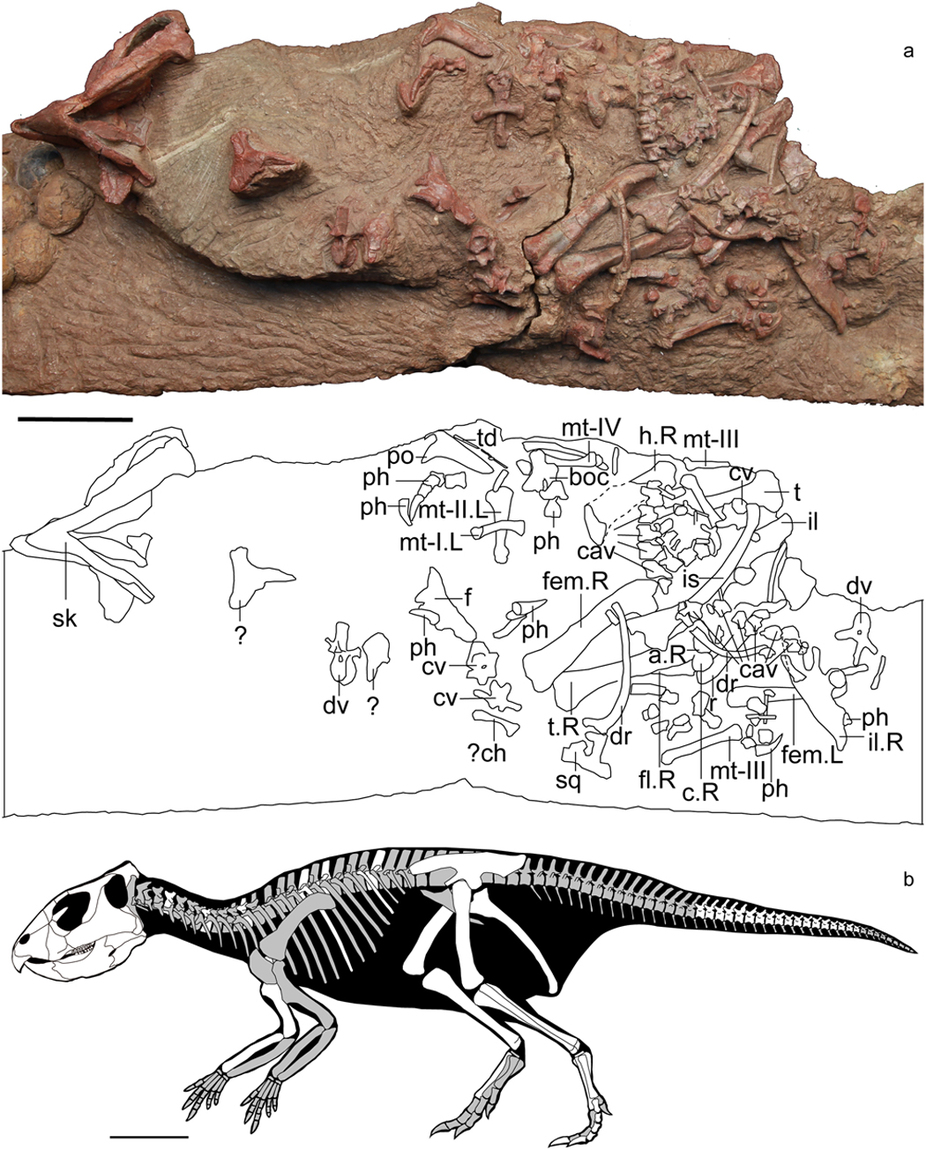
- Known material

Scientific classification
- Kingdom: Animalia
- Phylum: Chordata
- Class: Reptilia
- Clade: Dinosauria
- Clade: †Ornithischia
- Clade: †Ceratopsia
- Clade: †Neoceratopsia
- Genus: †Mosaiceratops; Zheng, Jin & Xu, 2015
- Species: †M. azumai

Binomial name
- †Mosaiceratops azumai Zheng, Jin & Xu, 2015

= Mosaiceratops =

Mosaiceratops Temporal range: Late Cretaceous, 94–72 Ma

Extinct genus of reptiles

Mosaiceratops is a genus of ceratopsian dinosaur that lived in the upper Cretaceous Xiaguan Formation in what is now the Henan Province of China. It was described by Zheng, Jin, and Xu in 2015 as the type species Mosaiceratops azumai. Although phylogenetic analyses have found it to be the basalmost neoceratopsian, the authors noted that several features in the premaxilla and nasal bones are shared with Psittacosaurus, indicating that neoceratopsians evolved premaxillary teeth twice and that the latter is not as primitive as previously thought.

== Discovery ==
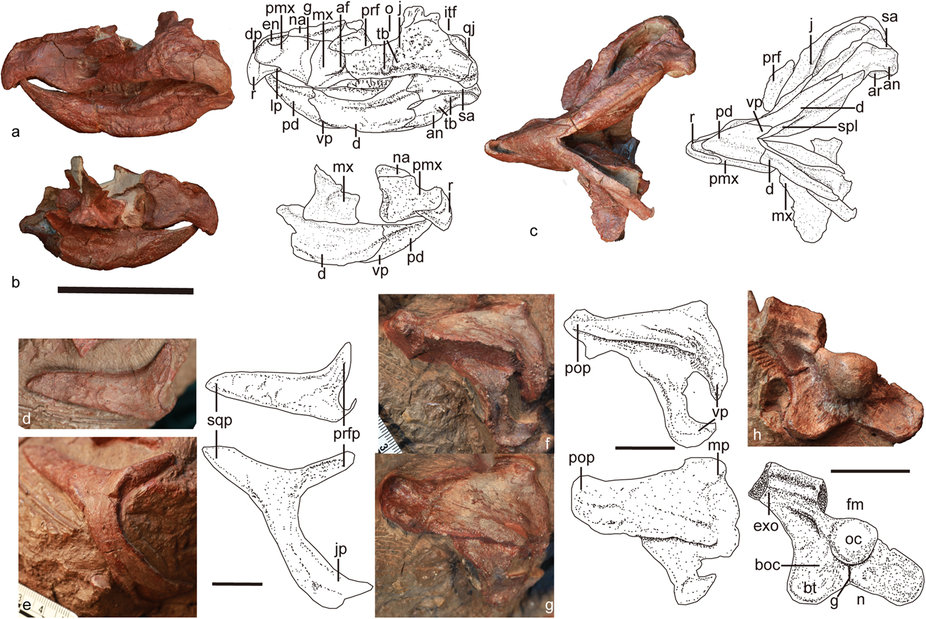
Cranial remains

On the westbank of the river Tuanhe in Neixiang in Henan the skeleton was discovered of a small ceratopian. The fossil was prepared by Sheng Yiming and Yu Chaohe.

In 2015, the type species Mosaiceratops azumai was named and described by Zheng Wenjie, Jin Xingsheng and Xu Xing. The generic name Mosaiceratops means "mosaic horned face", which refers to the mosaic of features normally found on basal neoceratopsians, psittacosaurids and other basal ceratopsians, especially the lack of premaxillary teeth. It is a combination of Latin mosaicus and Greek keras, "horn" and ops, "face". The specific name honours the Japanese paleontologist Yoichi Azuma, the discoverer of Archaeoceratops. Mosaiceratops was one of eighteen dinosaur taxa from 2015 to be described in open access or free-to-read journals.

The holotype, ZMNH M8856, was found in a layer of the Xiaguan Formation dating from the Turonian-Campanian. It is an incomplete and disarticulated skeleton with skull. It includes pelvis bones and leg bones (femur, tibia, fibula, ischium, ilium, some phalanges and metatarsals, calcaneum and astragalus), twenty-four vertebrae (three cervicals, three dorsals and eighteen caudals), a dorsal rib, a humerus, a radius and the anterior part of an articulated skull with a disarticulated postorbital bone and squamosal. The articulated skull preserves the rostral bone, premaxilla, maxilla, jugal bone, quadratojugal, dentary, surangular, angular bone, the anterior section of the prefrontal bone, and the anterior part of the nasal bone. The fossils are part of the collection of the Zhejiang Museum of Natural History.

== Description ==
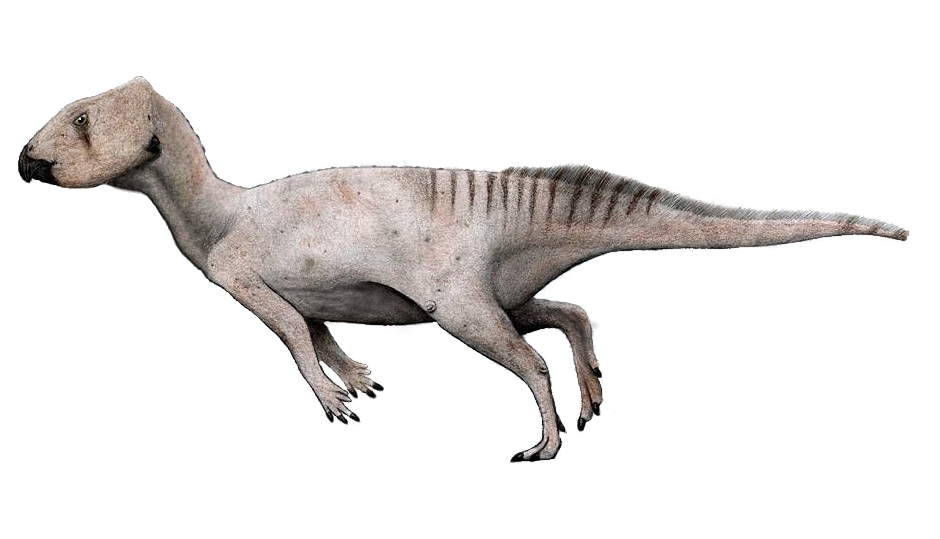
Life restoration

Mosaiceratops was a relatively small dinosaur, reaching 1 m (3.3 ft) in length and 10 kg (22 lb) in body mass. It can be distinguished by four autapomorphic, unique derived traits: the presence of an evident groove between the premaxilla and the maxilla in lateral view; the elongation of the anterior part of the jugal having a parallel upper edge and lower edge; the main body of the jugal below the eye sockets bears two small bumps; in the ilium the extremity of the upper edge of the rear blade is pointed obliquely to above and behind.

Mosaiceratops in size compared to a human being

Furthermore a unique combination is present of traits that in themselves are not unique. The premaxilla is edentulous, meaning it lacks teeth. The premaxilla is somewhat wider than the maxilla in lateral view (the presence of that trait is plesiomorphic, being shared with Psittacosaurus). The nasal bone has a front lower branch extending under the bony nostril. The jugal bone is formed as an inverted T. The postorbital is T-shaped with slender descending and rear branches. The inner branch of the squamosal bone points obliquely to the front and inside. The front branch of the squamosal is not forked. The basal tubers of the occiput are separated by a wide middle notch.

More in general, the skull overall is more similar to advanced taxa like Aquilops or Liaoceratops.

== Classification ==
Zheng et al. (2015), the describers of Mosaiceratops, recovered the genus as the most basal known neoceratopsian, closer to Triceratops than Psittacosaurus. Before the description of Mosaiceratops, the most basal known neoceratopsian was either Aquilops or Liaoceratops, depending on the analysis. However, they noted that this position was not strongly supported in their phylogenetic analysis, acknowledging the possibility that Mosaiceratops instead represents the sister taxon to Psittacosaurus (in which case the name Psittacosauridae would be reinstated). In their description of the postcrania of Yinlong, Han et al. (2018) noted that the external naris of Mosaiceratops was not as positioned as high as in Psittacosaurus, and recovered Mosaiceratops as more derived than Liaoceratops and Aquilops.

== See also ==
- Timeline of ceratopsian research
