= Xiaguan Formation =

Geological formation in Henan, China

- Stratigraphic range: Turonian-Campanian; ~94–70 Ma
- Type: Geological formation

Location
- Coordinates: 33.3°N 112.0°E
- Approximate paleocoordinates: 31.8°N 103.9°E
- Region: Henan Province
- Country: China
- Xiaguan Formation (China) Xiaguan Formation (Henan)

The Xiaguan Formation is a Turonian to Campanian geologic formation in Henan Province of China. Dinosaur remains are among the fossils that have been recovered from the formation.

== Paleofauna ==
- Baotianmansaurus
- Mosaiceratops
- Nanyangosaurus

== See also ==
- List of dinosaur-bearing rock formations
  - List of stratigraphic units with few dinosaur genera
