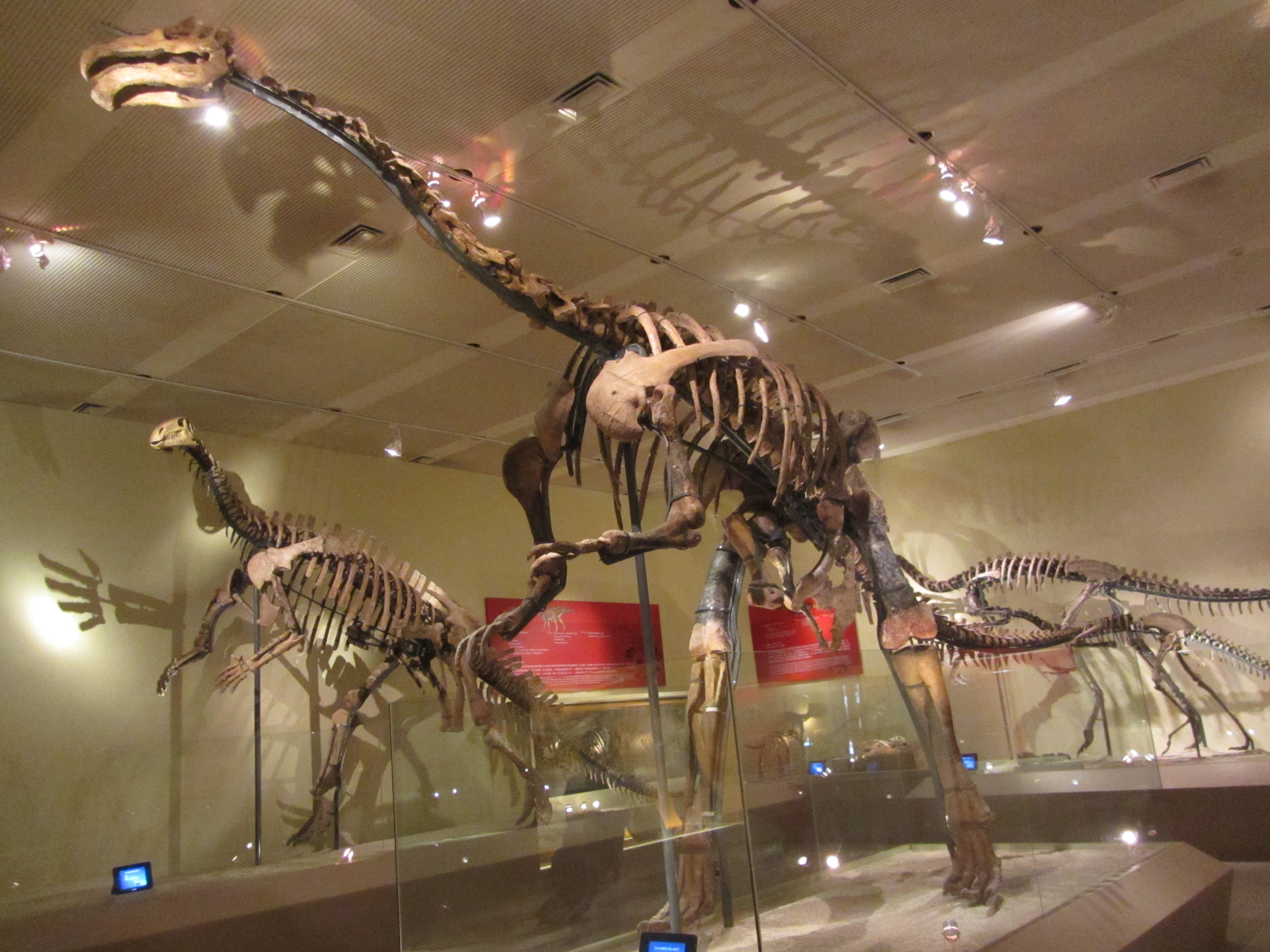
- Mounted skeleton displayed in National Museum of Natural Science with elements from both specimens

Scientific classification
- Kingdom: Animalia
- Phylum: Chordata
- Class: Reptilia
- Clade: Dinosauria
- Clade: Saurischia
- Clade: Theropoda
- Clade: †Therizinosauria
- Superfamily: †Therizinosauroidea
- Genus: †Suzhousaurus; Li et al. 2007

Type species
- †Suzhousaurus megatherioides Li et al. 2007

= Suzhousaurus =

Suzhousaurus Temporal range: Early Cretaceous, ~124–113 Ma

Extinct genus of dinosaurs

Suzhousaurus (meaning "Suzhou lizard") is an extinct genus of large therizinosaurid dinosaurs from the Early Cretaceous of China. The genus is known from two specimens discovered in the Xiagou and Zhonggou Formations, both part of the Xinminbao Group. These findings were made during fieldwork in 1999 and 2004.

Though Suzhousaurus is known from these two specimens, an earlier named and described therizinosauroid from the adjacent basin, "Nanshiungosaurus" bohlini, may be synonymous with the former. However, Suzhousaurus can not be compared to this species due to non-overlapping material and the loss of the same. Moreover, this synonymy will result in Suzhousaurus bohlini with "N". bohlini having priority.

Suzhousaurus was an unusually large Early Cretaceous therizinosauroid reaching lengths of 6 m (20 ft) and nearly 3.1 t (3,100 kg) in weight. The upper arm (humerus) was very distinct from therizinosaurids, making Suzhousaurus to be considered a basal therizinosauroid. Unlike derived (advanced) therizinosaurids, the vertebral column was not highly pneumatized. However, the pelvis shows a marked therizinosaurid-like opisthopubic build. Like other therizinosauroids, Suzhousaurus had elongated claws and neck for browsing, robust hindlimbs and a large trunk that ended on a reduced tail.

== History of discovery ==
Diagram showing known remains from FRDC-GSJB-99 and FRDC-GSJB-2004-001

The holotype specimen, FRDC-GSJB-99, was discovered in the Xinminbao Group at the Yujingzi Basin. It consists of a partial skeleton lacking cranial material but contains a right humerus, right scapulocoracoid, 10 dorsal vertebrae, partial ribs, nearly complete left and fragmentary right pubes, the lower end of the left ilium and several unidentified elements. The specimen was described in 2007 by Li Daqing, Peng Cuo, You Hailu, Matthew Lamanna, Jerrald Harris, Kenneth Lacovara and Zhang Jianping, also naming the type species Suzhousaurus megatherioides. In terms of etymology, the generic name, Suzhousaurus, is derived from Suzhou which is the old name for the Jiuquan area. The specific name, megatherioides, indicates a resemblance to the giant ground sloths Megatherium. Li and colleagues pointed out that Suzhousaurus might be identical to "Nanshiungosaurus" bohlini, an earlier named therizinosauroid found in the same geological group and also known from limited remains. If so, the resulting species name would be Suzhousaurus bohlini under the terms of priority. However, a direct comparison is difficult because there is no overlapping material and the holotype of "N". bohlini is apparently lost.

In 2008, a new and fairly more complete skeleton was described. The specimen FRDC-GSJB-2004-001 which contains the last three dorsal vertebrae, the sacrum composed of five sacral vertebrae, the first six caudal vertebrae, a very complete pelvic girdle composed of the left ilium, pubis and ischium, and both femora (right femur is fragmented), was discovered in 2004 by a field team of the Fossil Research and Development Center of Geology and Mineral Resources Exploration of Gansu Province also at the Xinminbao Group. Since the left pubis of both specimens share similar traits, these fossil remains represent another specimen for the taxon. Although both specimens lack cranial material, Button and colleagues reported an isolated dentary tooth referred to Suzhousaurus that was collected in the Yujingzi Basin near the area of the two specimens, which was described in detail by the same team and You Hailu in 2017.

In 2018, You with colleagues proposed the Mazongshan Fauna, which is composed by dinosaur taxa found on the Xiagou and Zhonggou formations, and provided more historical data from the Suzhousaurus specimens: FRDC-GSJB-99 was discovered around 1999 being found in mid gray-variegated beds of the Xiagou Formation dating to the early–mid-Aptian stage, and FRDC-GSJB-2004-001 was found in 2004 at the upper red beds in the Zhonggou Formation dating to the Early Albian.

== Description ==
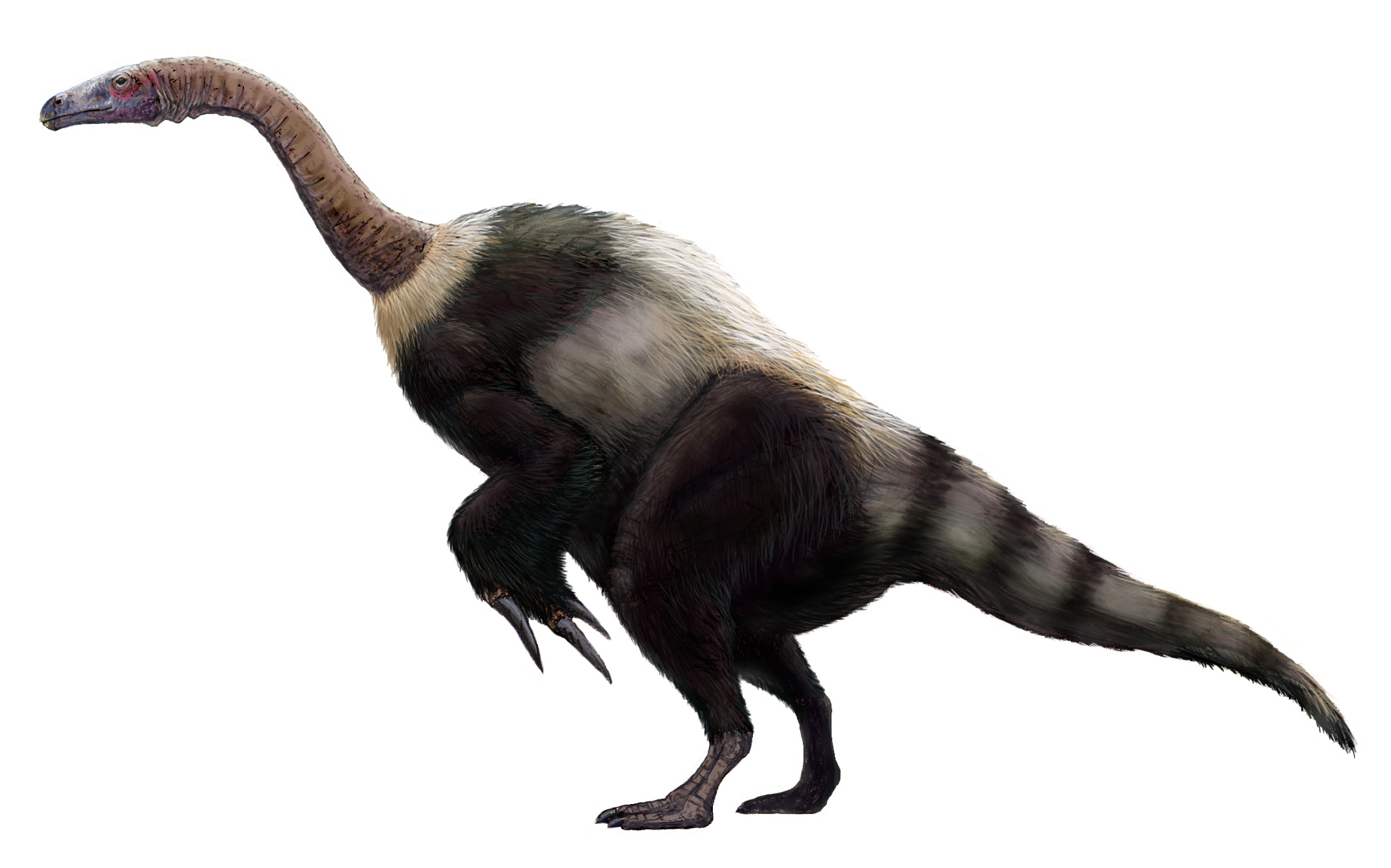
Life restoration

Suzhousaurus was one of the largest known Early Cretaceous therizinosauroids, with a length of 6 m (20 ft) and a ponderous weight of approximately 3.1 t (3,100 kg). Suzhousaurus can be differentiated from all other therizinosaur taxa in having a round top border of preacetabular projection of ilium, a foramen on the obturator area with a total width greater than its height from the top to the bottom, a relatively short pubis with a deep and wide obturator notch, and the ischiadic shaft is deflected towards the rear. Like other therizinosauroids, Suzhousaurus developed a prominent keratinous beak, had stocky/robust hindlimbs, a large belly and a reduced tail. Feather impressions from the therizinosauroids Beipiaosaurus suggest at least a partial feathering in Suzhousaurus.

The dorsal vertebrae centra in Suzhousaurus were mainly amphiplatian (flat on both ends) and amphicoelous (strongly concave on both ends). In more anterior vertebrae, large pleurocoels (small, air-filled holes) can be located on the lateral surfaces of the centra, but these progressively decrease in size. Pneumatic openings are absent. Along with the centra, the neural spines become more elongated on posterior series. The neural spines are subvertically oriented in the anterior dorsals but become more inclined towards the rear. The neural canals—where the spinal cord passes through—are very reduced. The sacrum is composed of five well-fused vertebrae that show no indications of pneumatization. Their neural spines are from a large plate. Overall, the caudal vertebrae are smaller than preceding vertebrae with more rounded facets. The wideness of the neural spine progressively decreases.

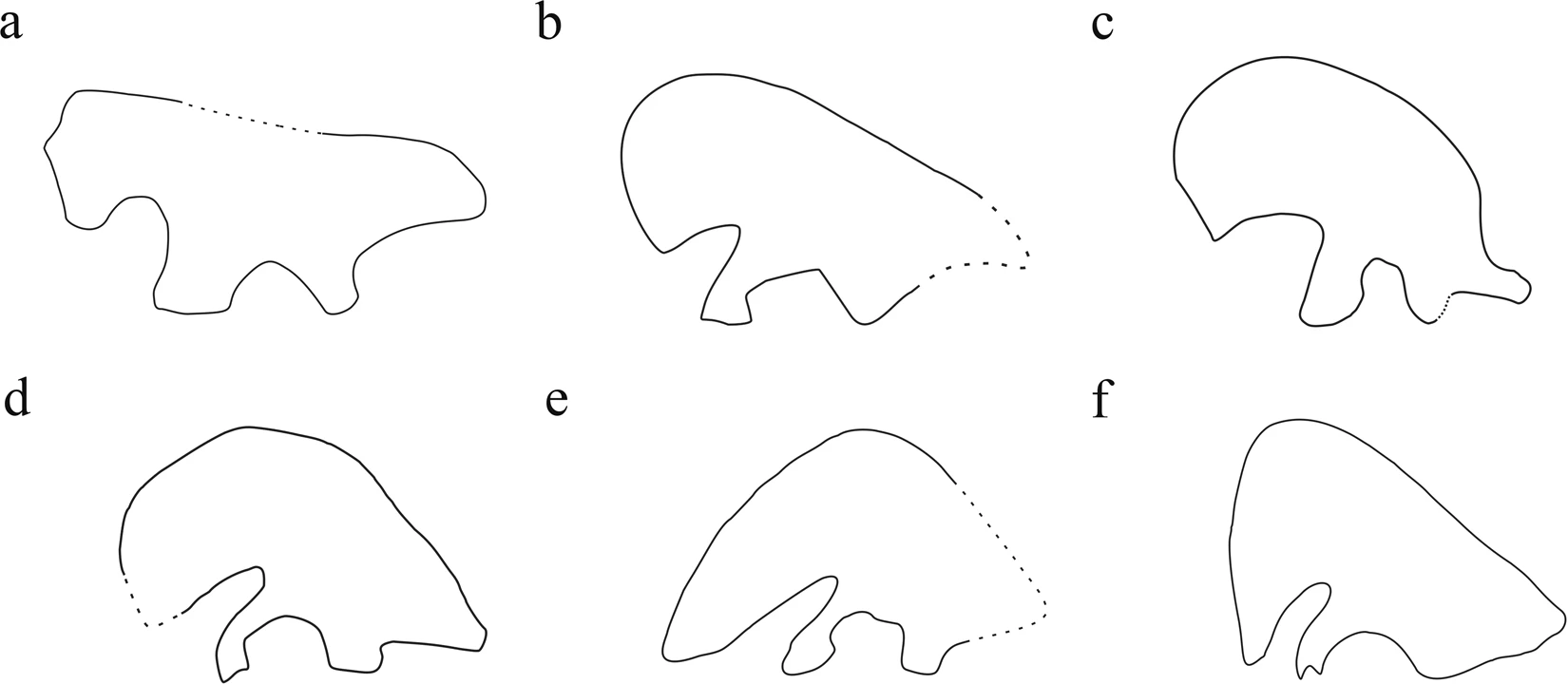
Schematic comparison of the ilium of Suzhousaurus (D) and other therizinosaurs

As a whole, the scapulocoracoid is a robust element that follows the shape of Segnosaurus and Therizinosaurus, but in a top view the scapular blade is very recurved, indicating a rather round thorax. The right scapula is attached to the coracoid and both elements appear to be coossified as in most other therizinosauroids. The right humerus is a large element, measuring 55 cm (550 mm) long, however, it lacks several therizinosaurid traits; the deltopectoral crest is more reduced than in most therizinosaurids such as Erliansaurus, Erlikosaurus, Neimongosaurus, Segnosaurus and Therizinosaurus, and the posterior trochanter is not present on the posterior surface of the humeral shaft center, which is present in therizinosaurids. Also, the lower end of the humerus is more flattened than in therizinosaurids. In these aspects, Suzhousaurus is more similar to therizinosauroids like Alxasaurus or Beipiaosaurus. The pelvis has a strong opisthopubic condition. The ilium has an expanded and slightly curved anterior end and a long rugose structure can be located on the posterior end. Being strongly recurved and connected to the ischium, the pubis has a large pubic boot (large expansion on the lower end). The ischium has an extensively expanded lower end similar to that of therizinosaurids. On its mid-height, a large ridge-like structure articulates with the pubis. The femur is highly thickened and robust with a well-developed great trochanter and articular surfaces. It has a total length of 84 cm (840 mm).

== Classification ==
Li and coauthors, in their description, assigned Suzhousaurus to the Therizinosauroidea, in a basal position. They performed a cladistic analysis that found the genus to be more derived than Beipiaosaurus and Falcarius, less derived than Alxasaurus and true therizinosaurids, and the sister taxon of Nothronychus, forming a clade with it. The more complete remains of have also confirm that Suzhousaurus is more derived than Falcarius and Beipiaosaurus, and less derived than therizinosaurids. On the large revision of the Therizinosauria performed by Lindsay Zanno in 2010, she found Suzhousaurus in a more derived position as the sister taxon of the Therizinosauridae representing the latest diverging therizinosauroid. which has also been corroborated by Button and colleagues. In 2019, Hartman and team performed a phylogenetic analysis for the Therizinosauria using data provided by Zanno 2010 and found this time Suzhousaurus as a therizinosaurid taxon, however, with poor support.

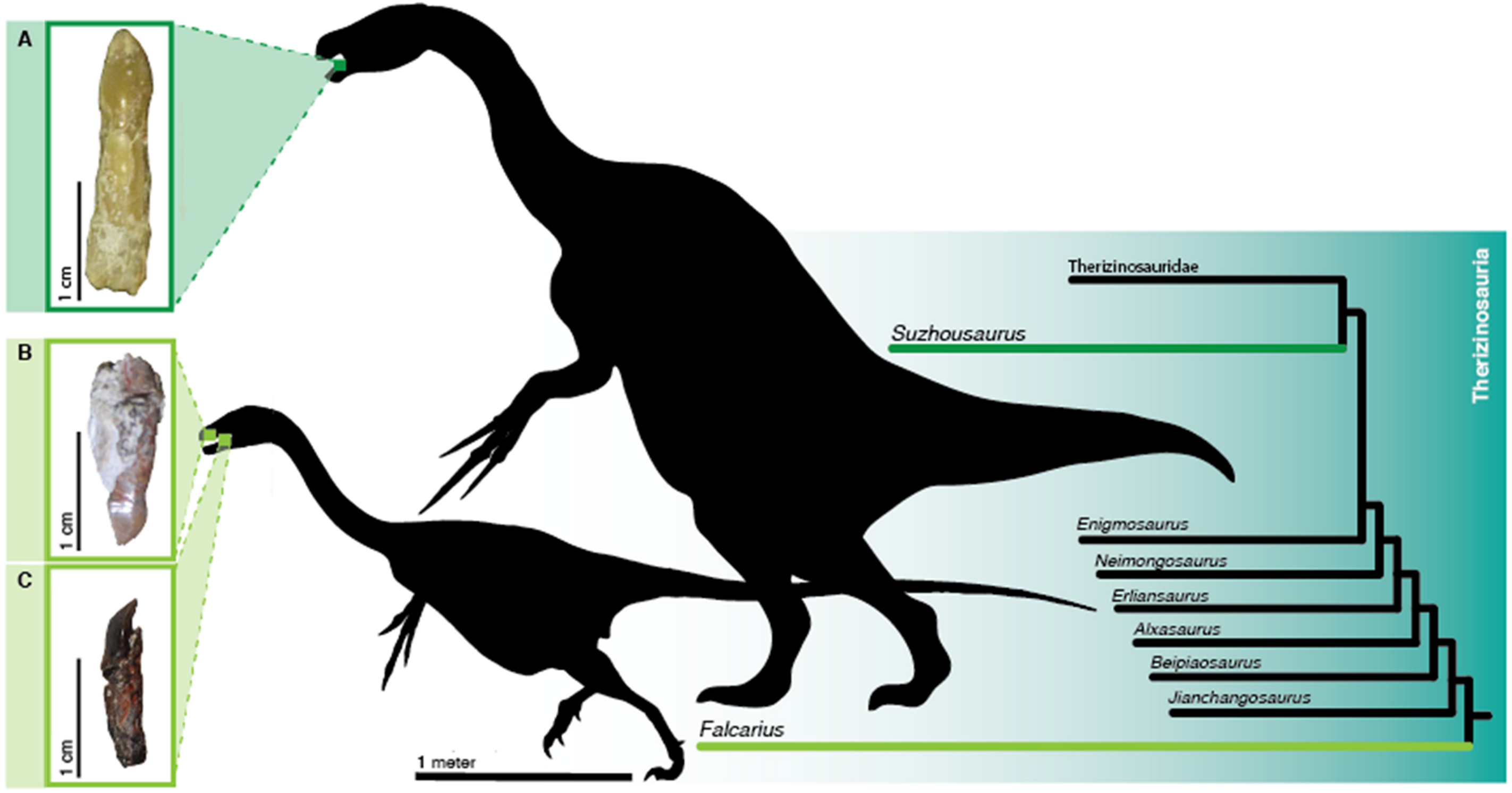
Relationships of Suzhousaurus and Falcarius. The former represents the latest diverging therizinosauroid

Results obtained by Zanno in 2010 for the Therizinosauroidea are shown in the cladogram below:

- Therizinosauroidea
  - Alxasaurus
  - - Erliansaurus
    - - Neimongosaurus
      - - Enigmosaurus
        - - Suzhousaurus
          - Therizinosauridae
            - Nothronychus
            - Nanshiungosaurus
            - Segnosaurus
            - Erlikosaurus
            - Therizinosaurus

== Paleoecology ==
The overall environment deposition of the Xinminbao Group suggests a clastic-dominated subsidence basin of low-relief in which weak, short-lived lakes repeatedly gave arise to open-land biomes. Suzhousaurus was a relatively large herbivorous component of its ecosystems. The known specimens were recovered from the complex of the Mazongshan Dinosaur Fauna, which is composed by the contemporaneous genera of both Xiagou and Zhonggou formations. During the late Aptian–early Albian eras, a large lake surrounded by narrow hills was likely present in the Mazongshan and Jiuquan areas, allowing dinosaur faunas to travel across areas without geographical barriers.

=== Xiagou Formation ===
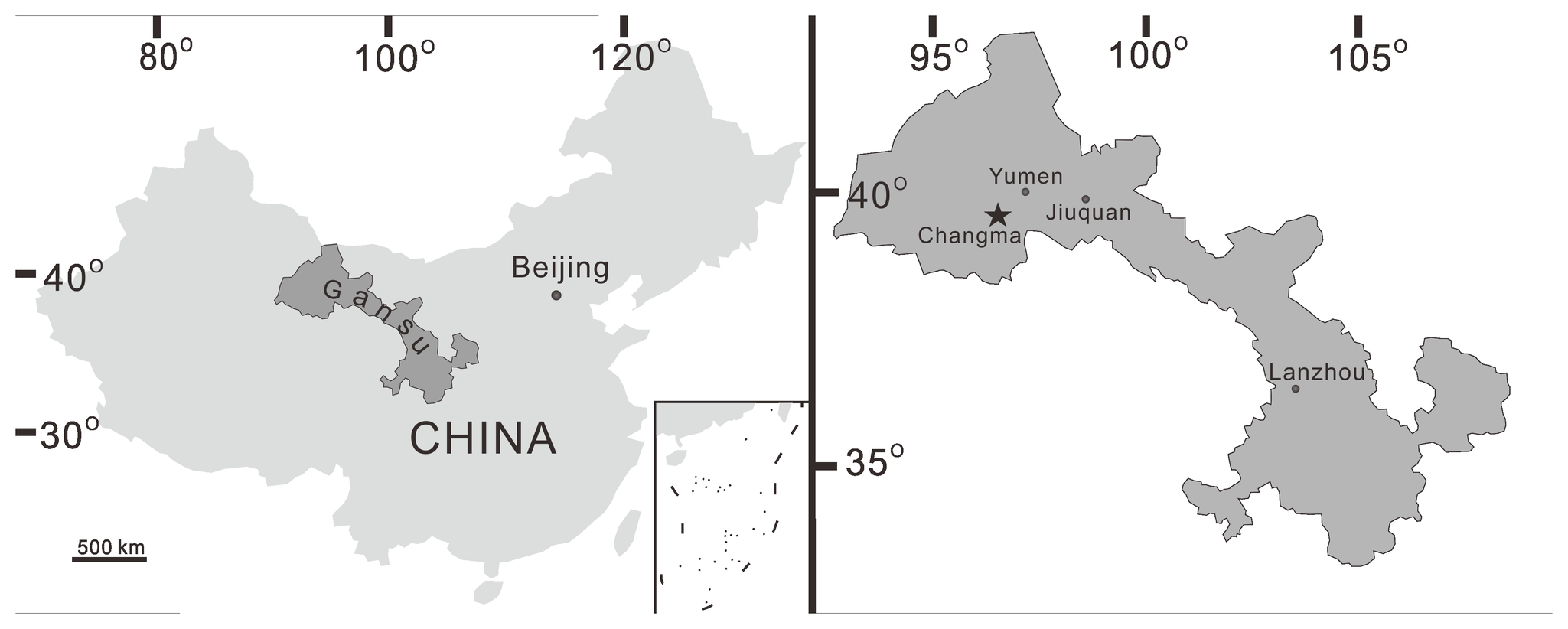
The vast majority of ornithothoracines are known from the near Changma Basin

The gray-variegated beds in the Xiagou Formation of the Yujingzi Basin were deposited in lowland-like environments with coastal conditions. A high diversity of ornithothoracines is known from this formation such as Avimaia, Changmaornis, Dunhuangia, Feitianius, Gansus, Jiuquanornis, Qiliania and Yumenornis. Other theropod dinosaurs known from the gray-variegated beds of Suzhousaurus include the large ornithomimosaur Beishanlong and the predatory tyrannosauroid Xiongguanlong. Additional herbivores are represented by Archaeoceratops, Jintasaurus, Qiaowanlong and Xuwulong.

=== Zhonggou Formation ===
The Albian Zhonggou Formation slightly overlains the sediments of the Xiagou Formation, and consists of abundant red fluvial sedimentation. Aside from the referred specimen of Suzhousaurus, sparse remains of Auroraceratops and Beishanlong are known from the red beds. The remains of ceratopsians and therizinosaurs in these beds could reflect a preference of niches close to rivers and lakes, whereas hadrosauroids and sauropods probably inhabited more interior environments of the region. However, ceratopsian and therizinosaur remains are also found in the gray-variegated beds of the Yujingzi Basin. In the Gongpoquan Basin, lacustrine-dominated conditions are represented by gray beds, which is consistent with a return to lacustrine deposits in the upper part of the Zhonggou Formation.

== See also ==
- Timeline of therizinosaur research
