= Jingmai O'Connor =

American paleontologist

Dr. Jingmai K. O'Connor
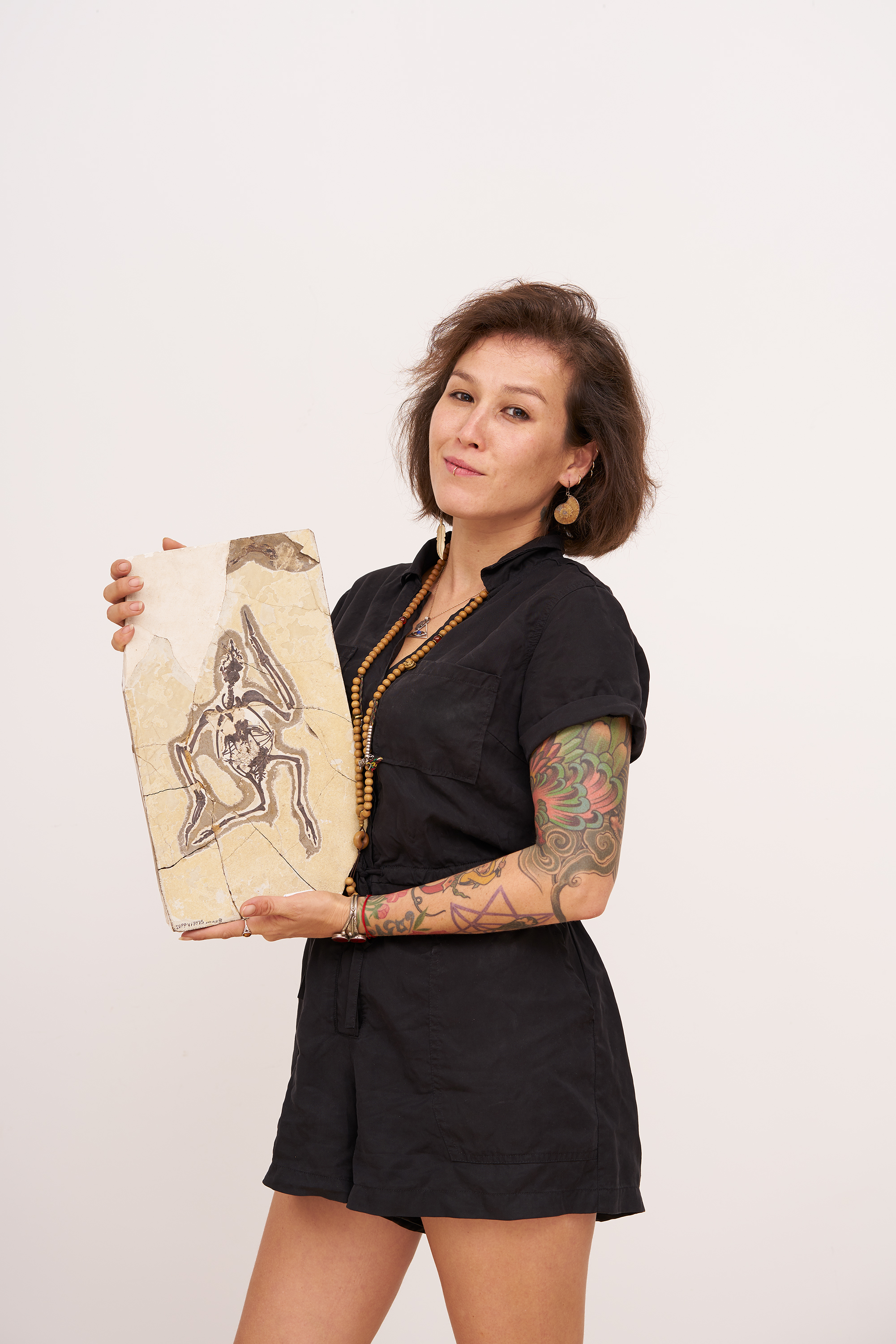
- Born: August 26, 1983 (age 43); Los Angeles, California.
- Citizenship: American
- Scientific career
- Fields: Paleontology
- Workplaces: Institute of Vertebrate Paleontology and Paleoanthropology; Field Museum
- Thesis: A Systematic Review of Enantiornithes (Aves: Ornithothoraces) (2009)
- Doctoral advisor: Luis M. Chiappe and Dr. David Bottjer
- Website: paleontologista.com

Jingmai Kathleen O'Connor (Chinese: 邹晶梅 Zōu Jīngméi; born August 26, 1983) is a paleontologist who works as a curator at the Field Museum in Chicago, Illinois.

== Biography ==
O'Connor is from Pasadena, California. Her mother is a geologist. O'Connor says that while she was not a dinosaur enthusiast as a child, being present for her mother's geology fieldwork began her interest in the subject. She explains, "I enjoyed going to the field with her, collecting rocks, minerals, and fossils, and playing in the lab."

O'Connor graduated from Occidental College after majoring in Geology and studying with Donald Prothero. While a student, she volunteered in the paleontology department of the Natural History Museum of Los Angeles County, working with Xiaoming Wang. She received a Ph.D. from the University of Southern California in 2009, studying ancient birds with Luis M. Chiappe and David Bottjer.

== Paleontology ==
After obtaining her Ph.D., O'Connor moved to Beijing where she worked as a postdoc at the Institute of Vertebrate Paleontology and Paleoanthropology. Working with Zhou Zhonghe, she advanced to a full professorship while continuing her ancient bird research. Professor O'Connor is half Chinese and says that she is "very, very proud and fascinated by my Chinese culture" and found moving to China to pursue paleontology very rewarding.

In 2011, O'Connor named a species of Qiliania, a Cretaceous-era bird that she discovered with a team, the Qiliania graffini after Greg Graffin. Graffin is most well-known as the singer of the punk band Bad Religion and is also a professor of Evolutionary biology.

During her time with the Institute, O'Connor was part of a team that made discoveries of extraordinary Enantiornithes remains preserved in Burmese amber. These deposits dated to 99 million years ago and the remains are among the most well-preserved of any Mesozoic dinosaur. The team found fully feathered wings, feet, and even entire hatchlings. With the team, and also as first author, Prof. O'Connor has published findings showing that enantiornithines had fully modern feathers, clarified the feather arrangements and musculature of several species.

O'Connor was given the Charles Schuchert Award by the Paleontological Society. The award is given annually to a person under 40 whose work reflects excellence and promise in the science of paleontology.

In 2020, O'Connor returned to the United States, becoming the Associate Curator of Fossil Reptiles at the Field Museum in Chicago. She continues to publish, and in 2021 co-authored a paper on the discovery of quartz crystals in the stomach of an enantiornithine Bohaiornis. She is also doing research within the Field's collection, studying the mysterious holes in the jaw of Sue the Tyrannosaurus rex. She also assisted with the museum's acquisition of the thirteenth known Archaeopteryx specimen, which was announced in 2024, and will conduct further research with it.

Below is a list of taxa that O'Connor has contributed to naming:

| Year | Taxon | Authors |
|---|---|---|
| 2026 | Jian changmaensis gen. et sp. nov. | Zhou, Lamanna, Poust, Li, You, & O'Connor |
| 2026 | Plumadraco bankoorum gen. et sp. nov. | Clark, O'Connor, Wang, Wang, Pruett-Jones, Zhang, Wang, Zheng, & Zhou |
| 2025 | Chromeornis funkyi gen. et sp. nov. | O'Connor, Wang, Clark, Kuo, Davila, Wang, Zheng, & Zhou |
| 2025 | Novavis pubisculata gen. et sp. nov. | O'Connor, Atterholt, Clark, Zhou, Peng, Zhang, & You |
| 2024 | Lokiceratops rangiformis gen. et sp. nov. | Loewen, Sertich, Sampson, O'Connor, Carpenter, Sisson, Øhlenschlæger, Farke, Makovicky, Longrich, & Evans |
| 2024 | Avisaurus darwini sp. nov. | Clark, Atterholt, Scannella, Carroll, & O'Connor |
| 2024 | Neobohaiornis lamadongensis gen. et sp. nov. | Shen, Clark, Fang, Chen, Jiang, Ji, & O'Connor |
| 2024 | Imparavis attenboroughi gen. et sp. nov. | Wang, Clark, O'Connor, Zhang, Wang, Zheng, & Zhou |
| 2022 | Meemannavis ductrix gen. et sp. nov. | O'Connor, Stidham, Harris, Lamanna, Bailleul, Hu, Wang, & You |
| 2022 | Brevidentavis zhangi gen. et sp. nov. | O'Connor, Stidham, Harris, Lamanna, Bailleul, Hu, Wang, & You |
| 2021 | Fortipesavis prehendens gen. et sp. nov. | Clark & O'Connor |
| 2020 | Mengciusornis dentatus gen. et sp. nov. | Wang, O'Connor, Zhou, & Zhou |
| 2019 | Mirusavis parvus gen. et sp. nov. | Wang, O'Connor, Bailleul, & Li |
| 2019 | Avimaia schweitzerae gen. et sp. nov. | Bailleul, O'Connor, Zhang, Li, Wang, Lamanna, Zhu, & Zhou |
| 2019 | Ambopteryx longibrachium gen. et sp. nov. | Wang, O'Connor, Xu, & Zhou |
| 2018 | Mirarce eatoni gen. et sp. nov. | Atterholt, Hutchison, & O'Connor |
| 2017 | Monoenantiornis sihedangia gen. et sp. nov. | Hu & O'Connor |
| 2017 | Cruralispennia multidonta gen. et sp. nov. | Wang, O'Connor, Pan, & Zhou |
| 2016 | Dingavis longimaxilla gen. et sp. nov. | O'Connor, Wang, & Hu |
| 2016 | Feitianius paradisi gen. et sp. nov. | O'Connor, Li, Lamanna, Wang, Harris, Atterholt, & You |
| 2016 | Linyiornis amoena gen. et sp. nov. | Wang, Wang, O'Connor, Wang, Zheng, & Zhang |
| 2015 | Yi qi gen. et sp. nov. | Xu, Zheng, Sullivan, Wang, Xing, Wang, Zhang, O'Connor, Zhang, & Pan |
| 2015 | Archaeornithura meemannae gen. et sp. nov. | Wang, Zheng, O'Connor, Lloyd, Wang, Wang, Zhang, & Zhou |
| 2014 | Eopengornis martini gen. et sp. nov. | Wang, O'Connor, Zheng, Wang, Hu, & Zhou |
| 2014 | Evgenavis nobilis gen. et sp. nov. | O'Connor, Averianov, & Zelenkov |
| 2014 | Piscivoravis lii gen. et sp. nov. | Zhou, Zhou, & O'Connor |
| 2014 | Tianyuornis cheni gen. et sp. nov. | Zheng, O'Connor, Wang, Zhang, & Wang |
| 2014 | Iteravis huchzermeyeri gen. et sp. nov. | Zhou, O'Connor, & Wang |
| 2013 | Changmaornis houi gen. et sp. nov. | Wang, O'Connor, Li, & You |
| 2013 | Jiuquanornis niui gen. et sp. nov. | Wang, O'Connor, Li, & You |
| 2013 | Yumenornis huangi gen. et sp. nov. | Wang, O'Connor, Li, & You |
| 2013 | Sulcavis geeorum gen. et sp. nov. | O'Connor, Zhang, Chiappe, Meng, Quangduo, & Di |
| 2012 | Jeholornis palmapenis sp. nov. | O'Connor, Sun, Xu, Wang, & Zhou |
| 2011 | Qiliania graffini gen. et sp. nov. | Ji, Atterholt, O'Connor, Lamanna, Harris, Li, You, & Dodson |
| 2010 | Shenqiornis mengi gen. et sp. nov. | Wang, O'Connor, Zhao, Chiappe, Gao, & Cheng |
| 2010 | Longicrusavis houi gen. et sp. nov. | O'Connor, Gao, & Chiappe |
| 2009 | Shanweiniao cooperorum gen. et sp. nov. | O'Connor, Wang, Chiappe, Gao, Meng, Cheng, & Liu |
| 2008 | Zhongornis haoae gen. et sp. nov. | Gao, Chiappe, Meng, O'Connor, Wang, Cheng, & Liu |
| 2006 | Dalingheornis liweii gen. et sp. nov. | Zhang, Hou, Hasegawa, O'Connor, Martin, & Chiappe |

== Works ==
- When Dinosaurs Conquered the Skies: The Incredible Story of Bird Evolution (2022). ISBN 9780711275133
