= Novavis =

Novavis Temporal range: Early Cretaceous (Aptian), 124–120 Ma

Scientific classification
- Kingdom: Animalia
- Phylum: Chordata
- Class: Reptilia
- Clade: Dinosauria
- Clade: Saurischia
- Clade: Theropoda
- Clade: Avialae
- Clade: †Enantiornithes
- Genus: †Novavis; O'Connor et al., 2025
- Species: †N. pubisculata

Binomial name
- †Novavis pubisculata O'Connor et al., 2025

Extinct bird genus

Novavis (meaning "strange bird") is an extinct genus of enantiornithean birds from the Early Cretaceous Xiagou Formation of China. The genus contains a single species, N. pubisculata, known from a partial skeleton. The pubis bone of Novavis is unusually short compared to other related birds.

== Discovery and naming ==
The Novavis holotype specimen, IVPP V31957, was discovered in 2005 in sediments of the Xiagou Formation (Changma Basin locality) near Changma Town in Yumen City of Gansu Province, China. The specimen is incomplete, comprising six or seven caudal vertebrae, a partial pelvic girdle (the right ischium and both pubes), and most of both hindlimbs, preserved on a single slab. Like many other bird fossils initially found in this locality, the holotype features a thick reflective layer of consolidant to secure the specimen. However, this obscures some details and prevents the precise identification of some bones. The specimen was initially housed at the Chinese Academy of Geological Sciences under the catalogue number CAGS-IG-05-CM-012 before being moved to the Institute of Vertebrate Paleontology and Paleoanthropology.

In 2025, O'Connor et al. described Novavis pubisculata as a new genus and species of enantiornithean birds based on these fossil remains. The generic name, Novavis, combines the Latin words novus, meaning "strange" and avis, meaning "bird". It is also intended to honor Nova R. J. Sumita. The specific name, pubisculata, is derived from roots that mean "short" or "diminutive" pubis. The full binomial name translates to "strange bird with short pubis", in reference to the unusual proportions of the pelvic girdle.

Four other enantiornithean birds—all known from incomplete skeletons—were named from the Xiagou Formation prior to Novavis: Qiliania, Dunhuangia, Feitianius, and Avimaia. The formation's bird fauna is otherwise dominated by more than 70 specimens of the ornithuromorph Gansus yumenensis.

== Classification ==
In their phylogenetic analyses, O'Connor et al. (2025) recovered Novavis as a member of the extinct Cretaceous bird clade Enantiornithes. They noted that their analyses found Novavis to be more basal than the other Xiagou Formation enantiornitheans that it coexisted with (highlighted below) except for Dunhuangia, which it was recovered in a polytomy with alongside Eocathayornis. Their results are displayed in the cladogram below:

- Ornithothoraces
  - Euornithes
  - †Enantiornithes
    - - Protopteryx
      - Iberomesornis
    - - - Pengornis
        - Eopengornis
      - - - Rapaxavis
          - Longirostravis
        - - Shanweiniao
          - Longipteryx
          - - Novavis
            - Dunhuangia
            - Eocathayornis
            - - - Eoalulavis
                - Concornis
                - Cathayornis yandica
              - - Neuquenornis
                - Halimornis
                - Enantiophoenix
                - Feitianius
                - GSGM-FV-00516
                  (indeterminate unnamed enantiornithean)
                - Qiliania
                - Avimaia
                - Shenqiornis
                - Eoenantiornis
                - Elsornis

== See also ==
- List of bird species described in the 2020s
