= Xiagou Formation =

Geologic formation in Gansu, China

- Stratigraphic range: late Aptian; ~123–113 Ma
- Type: Geological formation
- Unit of: Xinminbao Group
- Underlies: Zhonggou Formation
- Overlies: Chijinpu Formation

Lithology
- Primary: Mudstone
- Other: Shale, siltstone

Location
- Coordinates: 39.9°N 96.8°E
- Approximate paleocoordinates: 39.1°N 97.5°E
- Region: Gansu
- Country: China
- Extent: Changma Basin

Type section
- Named for: Xiagou
- Xiagou Formation (China)

The Xiagou Formation is the middle strata of the Xinminbao Group. It is named for its type site in Xiagou, in the Changma Basin of Gansu Province, northwestern China and is considered Early Cretaceous in age. It is known outside the specialized world of Chinese geology as the site of a Lagerstätte in which the fossils were preserved of Gansus yumenensis, the earliest true modern bird.

== Description ==
The laminated yellowish mudstones of the Xiagou Formation are the lithified remnants of varves that were laid down as extremely fine silt settled to the bottom of a tranquil freshwater lake. The result was dense anoxic bottom sediment, where the lack of bacteria slowed the processes of decay, preserving uncompressed fossils in details that include feather impressions and remnants of the webbing between the bird's toes. The age of the formation has not yet been confidently determined. The underlying Chijinpu Formation is likely the same age as the Jehol Group due to the presence of similar fossils, meaning that the Xiagou Formation is probably slightly younger than the Jehol biota, dating to around the late Aptian.

== Fossil content ==
The Xiagou Formation is particularly noted for its high diversity of ancient birds. These include both modern birds close to the ancestors of living species, and related lineages now entirely extinct. Other fossils from the Xiagou Formation are characteristic of an Early Cretaceous lake ecology. There are fossils of abundant fish fauna, Charophyta and ostracods.

Color key
Taxon	Reclassified taxon	Taxon falsely reported as present	Dubious taxon or junior synonym	Ichnotaxon	Ootaxon	Morphotaxon

Notes
Uncertain or tentative taxa are in small text; ~~crossed out~~ taxa are discredited.

=== Invertebrates ===
==== Arthropods ====
Genus	Species	Location	Stratigraphic position	Material	Notes	Images
Blattapterix	B. gansu					
Cretacechorista	C. qilianshanensis					
Eurycoleus	E. arcuatus, E. clypeolatus, E. dimorphocellatus, E. parvus				A carabid.	
Glottocoleus	G. lenticulata, G. stellatus					
Mesoblattina	M. cretacea					
Mesocoleus	M. zhonggouense					
Mesotricupes	M. reticulatus					
Petalocupes	P. arcus					
Phyllocoleus	P. striolatus					
Planocoleus	P. ensatus					
Pleurocoleus	P. catenatus					
Spinus	S. yumenense					
Tetillopsis	T. parvula					
Yumenocoleus	Y. intermedius, Y. lineatus, Y. longus					

=== Theropods ===
==== Birds ====
Genus	Species	Location	Stratigraphic position	Material	Notes	Images
Avimaia	A. schweitzerae	Changma Basin		"Partial skeleton with an egg."	An enantiornithean.	
Brevidentavis	B. zhangi			Incomplete skull and cervical vertebrae.	An ornithuromorph.	
Changmaornis	C. houi	Changma Basin		"Partial pelvic girdle with hindlimb."	An euornithian.	
Dunhuangia	D. cuii	Changma Basin		"Forelimbs."	An enantiornithean.	
Feitianius	F. paradisi	Changma Basin		"Hindlimbs with pelvic area and vertebrae."	An enantiornithean.	
Gansus	G. yumenensis			"Partial hindlimbs."	An euornithian.	
Jiuquanornis	J. niui	Changma Basin		"Partial pectoral girdle."	An euornithian.	
Meemannavis	M. ductrix			Incomplete skull and cervical and thoracic vertebrae.	An ornithuromorph.	
Novavis	N. pubisculata	Changma Basin		Partial skeleton including tail vertebrae, a pelvis, and the hindlimbs.	An enantiornithean.	
Qiliania	Q. graffini	Changma Basin		"Partial skeleton from two individuals."	An enantiornithean.	
Unnamed enantiornithean	Indeterminate			"Partial forelimb."	An enantiornithean.	
Yumenornis	Y. huangi	Changma Basin		"Right forelimb."	An euornithian.	

==== Non-avian theropods ====
Genus	Species	Location	Stratigraphic position	Material	Notes	Images
Beishanlong	B. grandis	Yujingzi Basin	Gray-variegated beds	"Fore and hindlimbs with partial vertebrae."	An ornithomimosaur	
Jian	J. changmaensis	Changma Basin		Pectoral girdle and partial forelimb	A microraptorine	
Suzhousaurus	S. megatherioides	Yujingzi Basin	Gray-variegated beds	"Dorsal vertebrae, ribs and partial shoulder girdle."	A therizinosauroid	
Xiongguanlong	X. baimoensis	Yujingzi Basin	Gray-variegated beds	"Skull without lower jaws, partial vertebrae, ilium and femur."	A tyrannosauroid	

=== Cerapods ===
==== Ceratopsians ====
Genus	Species	Location	Stratigraphic position	Material	Notes	Images
Archaeoceratops	A. yujingziensis	Yujingzi Basin	Gray-variegated beds	"Caudal vertebrae and a partial hindlimb."	A neoceratopsian.	

==== Hadrosauroids ====
Genus	Species	Location	Stratigraphic position	Material	Notes	Images
Jintasaurus	J. meniscus	Yujingzi Basin	Gray-variegated beds	"Partial skull."	A hadrosauroid.	
Xuwulong	X. yueluni	Yujingzi Basin	Gray-variegated beds	"Articulated skeleton lacking limbs."	A hadrosauroid.	

=== Sauropods ===
==== Macronarians ====
Genus	Species	Location	Stratigraphic position	Material	Notes	Images
Qiaowanlong	Q. kangxii	Yujingzi Basin	Gray-variegated beds	"Cervical vertebrae and right pelvic girdle."	A somphospondylan.	

=== Other vertebrates ===
==== Pterosaur ====
Genus	Species	Location	Stratigraphic position	Material	Notes	Images
Pterosauria indet.	indeterminate			Proximal end of the first wing phalanx and fused extensor tendon process	Estimated wingspan around 4 meters	

==== Turtles ====
Genus	Species	Location	Stratigraphic position	Material	Notes	Images
Changmachelys	C. bohlini	Changma Basin		"Nearly complete skeletons from four individuals."	A macrobaenid.	

==== Fish ====
Genus	Species	Location	Stratigraphic position	Material	Notes	Images
Shuleichthys	S. brachypteryx			"Complete skeleton from four individuals."	An osteoglossomorph.	

=== Plants ===
Genus	Species	Location	Stratigraphic member	Material	Notes	Images
Xenoxylon	X. meisteri	Hongliuxia		Wood	A podocarp	

== See also ==
- List of fossil sites (with link directory)
- Lianmuqin Formation, contemporaneous fossiliferous formation of Xinjiang, western China
- Jiufotang Formation, contemporaneous fossiliferous formation of Liaoning, northeastern China
- Eumeralla Formation, contemporaneous fossiliferous formation of Victoria, Australia
- Elrhaz Formation, contemporaneous fossiliferous formation of Niger
- Crato Formation, contemporaneous fossil insect bearing Lagerstätte of Brazil
