= Schizoouridae =

Schizoourids Temporal range: Aptian, ~120–113 Ma

Scientific classification
- Kingdom: Animalia
- Phylum: Chordata
- Class: Reptilia
- Clade: Dinosauria
- Clade: Saurischia
- Clade: Theropoda
- Clade: Avialae
- Clade: Euornithes
- Family: †Schizoouridae; Zelenkov, 2015

Genera
- †Mengciusornis; †Schizooura

Extinct family of dinosaurs

Schizoouridae is an extinct family of euornithean theropods that lived in what is now China during the Early Cretaceous. It was first named by Zelenkov in 2015 and was originally diagnosed as "toothless birds with low mandibular symphysis, robust furcula with a well-developed hypocleidium, broad coracoids and phylogenetically more close to Schizooura lii Zhou et al., 2012 than to Apsaravis ukhaana Norell and Clarke, 2002". The genus Schizooura Zhou et al., 2012 was initially designated as the type and, at that time, the only known genus within the family. Later, Wang and colleagues (2019) described Mengciusornis dentatus as a close relative of Schizooura lii and, being apparently unaware of the previous description of the family, designated it as a clade containing all taxa more closely related to Mengciusornis dentatus and Schizooura lii than to Bellulornis or Jianchangornis microdonta. Based on the same type genus, Schizoouridae Zelenkov 2015 is hence a senior synonym of Schizoouridae Wang et al. 2019. Members of the family possessed several features that are rarely found in euornitheans, but are more typical of enantiornitheans and more basal groups. These include a robust furcula with a prominent hypocleidium, and (in Mengciusornis) teeth at the tip of the premaxilla.

== Classification ==
The cladogram below follows Wang et al. (2019):

- Ornithuromorpha
  - Archaeorhynchus
  - - Jianchangornis
    - - - Schizoouridae
          - Mengciusornis
          - Schizooura
        - - Bellulornis
          - - Apsaravis
            - Patagopteryx
            - Vorona
      - - Hongshanornithidae
        - - Songlingornis
          - - Yanornis
            - - Piscivoravis
              - - Yixianornis
                - - Iteravis
                  - - Gansus
                    - Ornithurae
