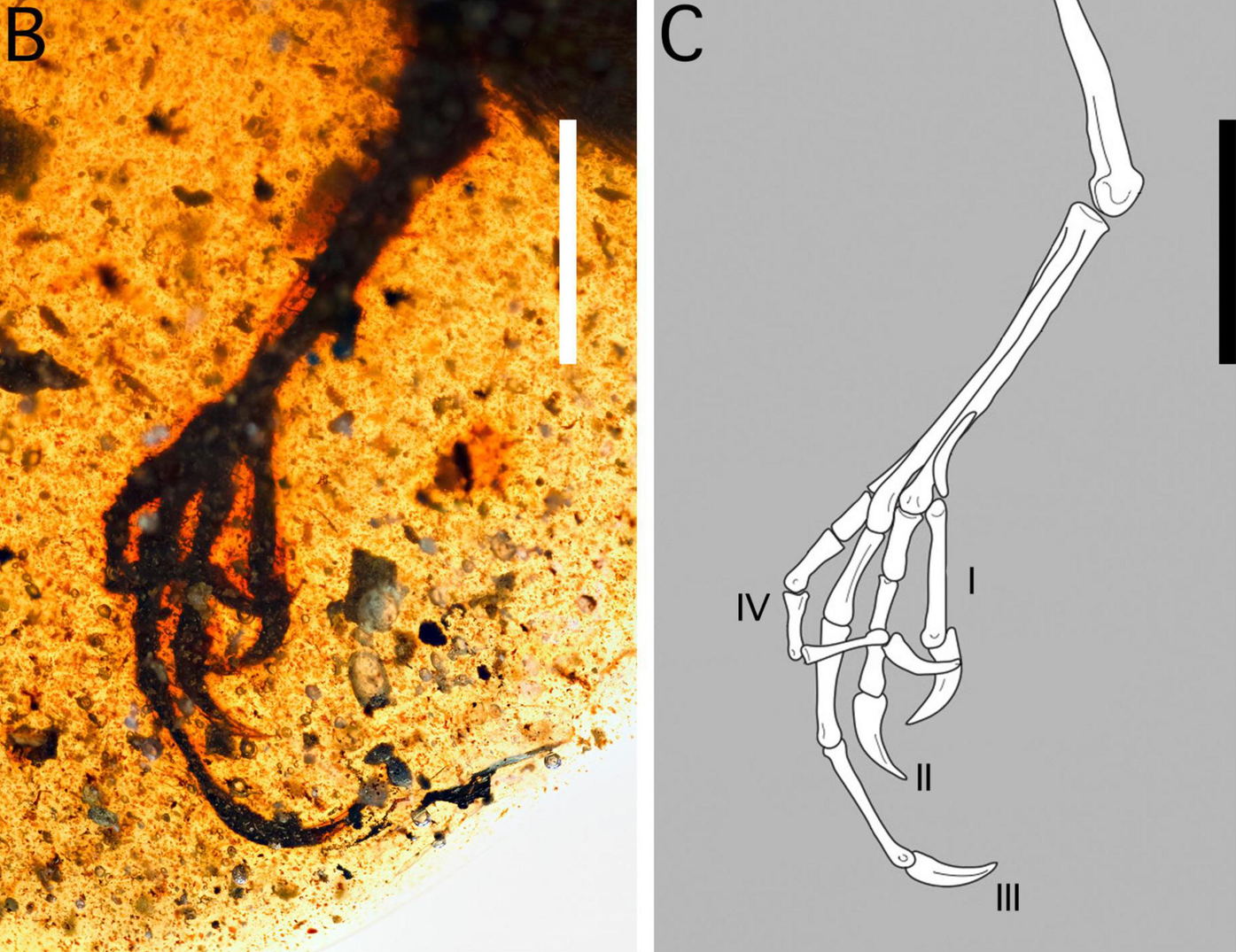
- Foot of the holotype specimen

Scientific classification
- Kingdom: Animalia
- Phylum: Chordata
- Class: Reptilia
- Clade: Dinosauria
- Clade: Saurischia
- Clade: Theropoda
- Clade: Avialae
- Clade: †Enantiornithes
- Genus: †Elektorornis; Xing et al., 2019
- Species: †E. chenguangi

Binomial name
- †Elektorornis chenguangi Xing et al., 2019

= Elektorornis =

Elektorornis Temporal range: Late Cretaceous (Cenomanian), 99 Ma

Extinct bird genus

Elektorornis (lit. 'amber bird') is an extinct genus of enantiornithean bird from the Late Cretaceous of Myanmar. The genus contains a single species, Elektorornis chenguangi, known from a partial hindlimb and a small amount of wing plumage preserved in amber. In life, it would have been slightly smaller than a sparrow and possibly used its characteristically elongated middle toe to probe for food. Elektorornis chenguangi is the first bird species described from remains found in Burmese amber, although other undiagnostic enantiornithean specimens have previously been found.

Alexander D. Clark and Jingmai O'Connor (2021) observed that extant animals with similar probing structures consistently have additional anatomical traits that allow the animal to penetrate a hard substrate, such as wood. The researchers concluded that Elektorornis likely would have had an edentulous (toothless) beak to pry or gouge into wood, allowing it to use its uniquely elongated toe to acquire prey. If the genus did have teeth, they were likely restricted to the back part of the mouth.

== See also ==
- Fortipesavis - another enantiornithean preserved in Burmese amber
- Paleobiota of Burmese amber
