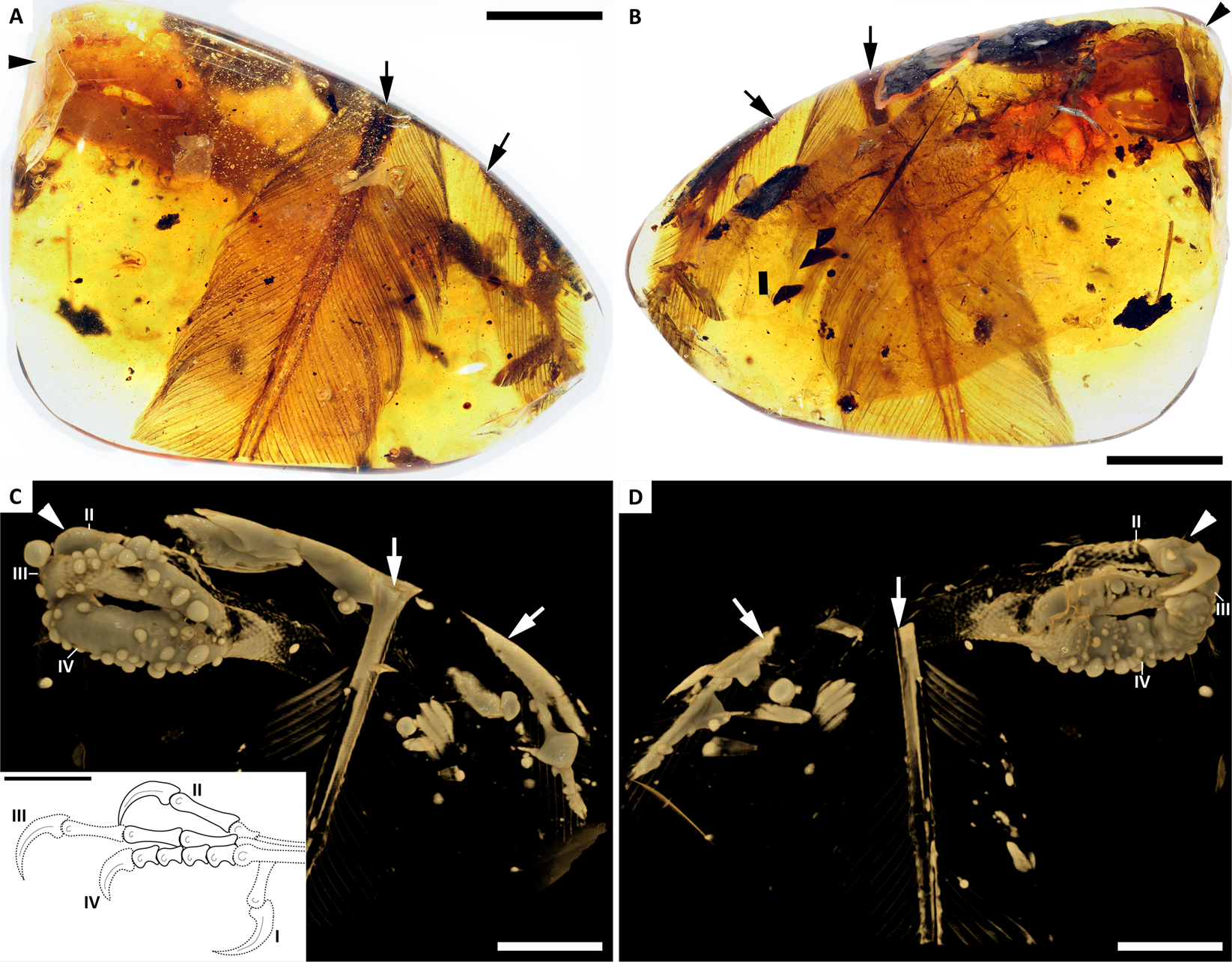
- Holotype of Fortipesavis prehendens in amber (A, B) and micro-CT rendering (C, D)

Scientific classification
- Kingdom: Animalia
- Phylum: Chordata
- Class: Reptilia
- Clade: Dinosauria
- Clade: Saurischia
- Clade: Theropoda
- Clade: Avialae
- Clade: †Enantiornithes
- Genus: †Fortipesavis; Clark & O'Connor, 2021
- Species: †F. prehendens

Binomial name
- †Fortipesavis prehendens Clark & O'Connor, 2021

= Fortipesavis =

Fortipesavis Temporal range: Late Cretaceous (Cenomanian), ~98.8 Ma

Extinct bird genus

Fortipesavis (lit. 'strong-footed bird') is an extinct genus of enantiornithean bird from the Late Cretaceous (Cenomanian age) of Myanmar. The genus contains a single species, Fortipesavis prehendens, known from a partial left foot preserved in amber. The outermost toe of Fortipesavis is unusually robust, and likely gave the animal greater stability and grip when perching.

== Discovery and naming ==
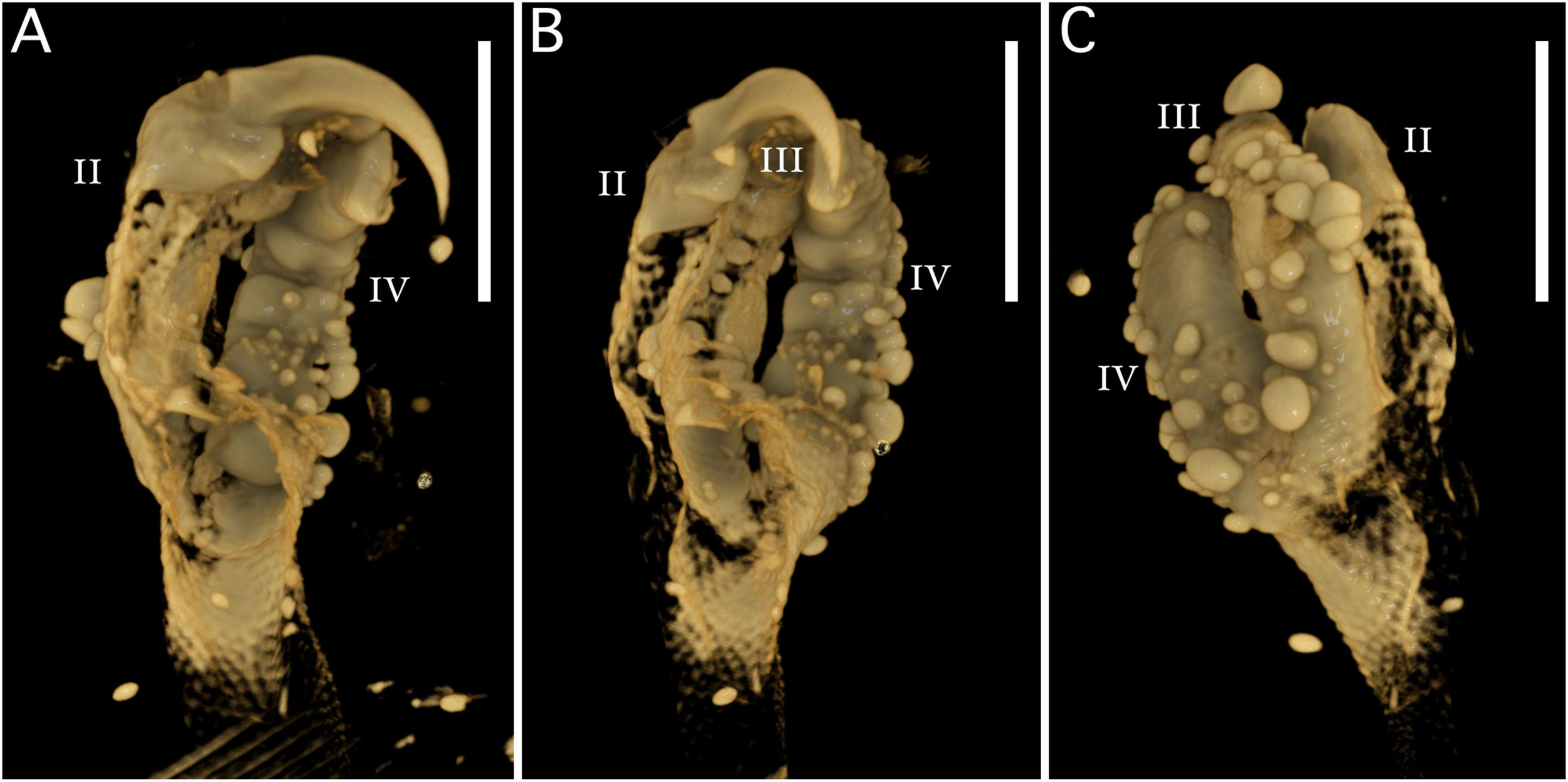
Rendering of the holotype foot using micro-CT data; note the elongated claw and wart-like decay bubbles.

The Fortipesavis fossil material was collected from an amber mine in Kachin State (Angbamo site), Myanmar. The specimen consists of a partial left foot with many associated feathers, preserved in a small piece of amber weighing 2.68 grams (0.095 oz) and measuring 25.6 mm × 18.2 mm × 9.2 mm (1.01 in × 0.72 in × 0.36 in). It is housed in the Yingliang Stone Natural History Museum, where it is permanently accessioned as specimen YLSNHM01001. In addition to the partially-preserved sparse feathers on the foot, two large pennaceous feathers are also preserved in the amber nearby. The preserved foot does not include any bone; instead, it preserves only a skin outline, allowing the shape of the bones to be deduced. This external mold comprises digits II, III, and IV, in addition to the end of the tarsometatarsus. The keratinous sheath of the ungual (claw) of digit II is preserved, but none of the other unguals are observable. Prominent decay bubbles emanate from the foot's surface, resulting in a 'warty' appearance, although these are not genuine features of the animal's integument.

In 2019, Lida Xing and colleagues published a description of YLSNHM01001, discussing its preservation and unusual morphology. Based on the foot and feather anatomy, the authors identified the specimen as belonging to an enantiornithean bird. While they noted that the proportions of its toes are unlike those of any other Mesozoic bird, the authors refrained from naming the specimen as a new taxon. In 2021, Alexander D. Clark and Jingmai O'Connor described Fortipesavis prehendens as a new genus and species based on YLSNHM01001, establishing this specimen as the holotype. The generic name, Fortipesavis, combines the Latin compound fortipes, meaning 'strong-footed', with the Latin avis, meaning 'bird'. The specific name, prehendens, is derived from a Latin word meaning 'to grip' or 'to grasp'. The intended meaning of the full binomial name is 'griping strong-footed bird', alluding to the likely friction-increasing function of the enlarged outermost toe.

== Paleobiology ==
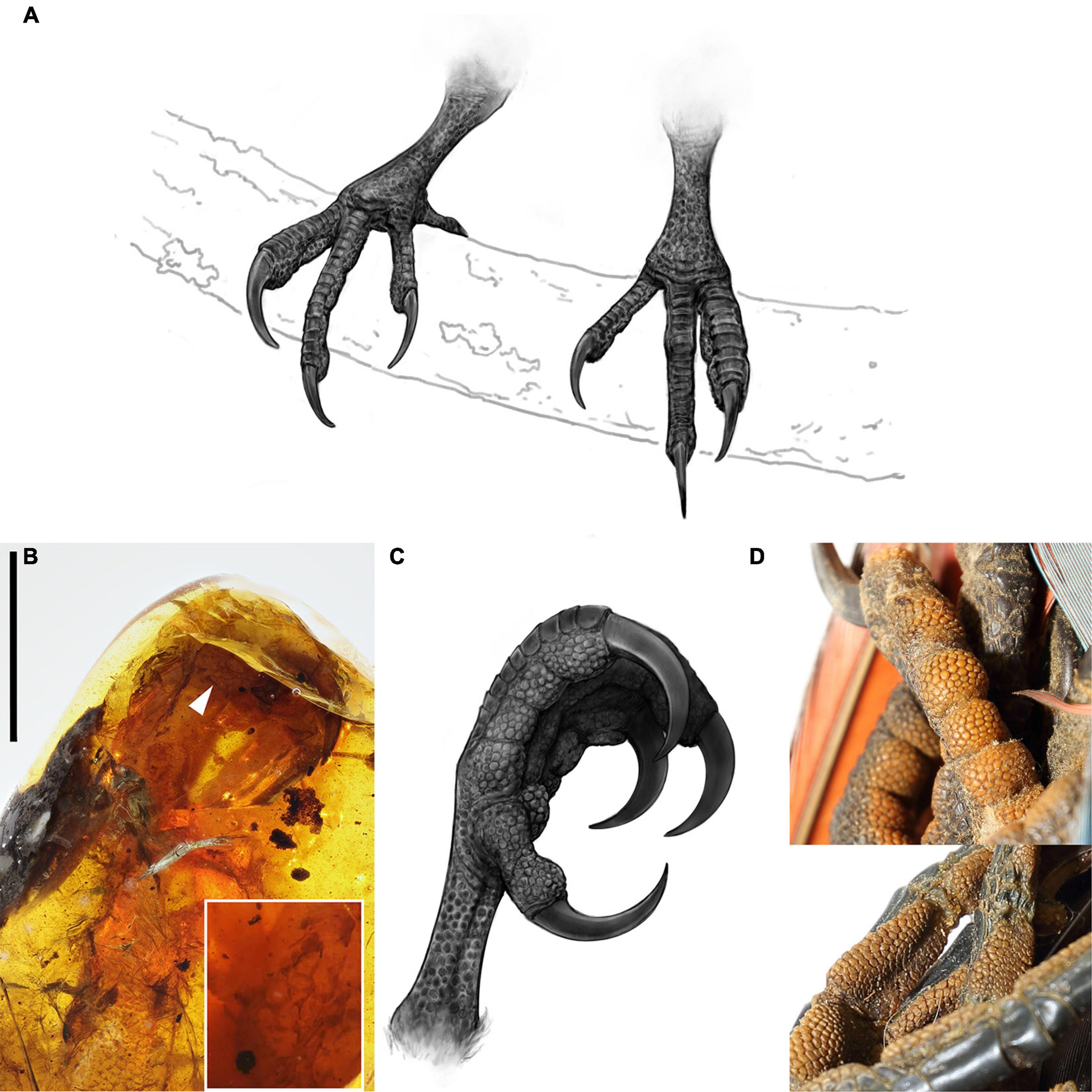
Foot anatomy of Fortipesavis, with a reconstruction of the animal's feet in a perching position (A) and photos of the toe pads of living birds (D)

Xing et al. (2019) speculated that Fortipesavis may have been raptorial, based on the long claws and padded, robust digits; the toe pads bear a 'pebbly' texture comparable to what is seen in some modern birds of prey. In their 2021 description of the animal, Clark and O'Connor disagreed with this interpretation, claiming the pad texture is more similar to that of modern phasianids (pheasants and their relatives), toucans, and parrots, and that the toe morphology is inconsistent with a raptorial ecology.

The fourth pedal (foot) digit of Fortipesavis is extremely robust, being almost twice as wide as the second digit. This feature is unknown is any other bird. Clark and O'Connor (2021) compared this to syndactyly observed in some modern birds, in which soft tissue surrounds the third and fourth digits, creating a single, much larger, functional toe. The increased size of this digit may have given the animal improved grip and stability when perching, since the toe is expanded laterally (outward), providing more surface area and friction to contact and grip a perch. While Fortipesavis is not syndactylous, the highly modified toe structure may have served a similar function; modern birds with comparable anatomy, such as bee-eaters and kingfishers, often hunt from thin, mobile perches, such as swaying branches, suggesting Fortipesavis may have done the same. Similar to these extant birds, Fortipesavis likely had proportionately small feet, based on the robusticity and inferred stoutness of the metatarsals. Clark and O'Connor concluded that the evidence best supported Fortipesavis as an aerial insectivore—feeding on small invertebrates—using its feet to effectively grasp thin branches, rather than prey items. A piscivorous diet as in kingfishers is less likely, given the small body size of Fortipesavis.

== See also ==
- Elektorornis - another enantiornithean preserved in Burmese amber
- Paleobiota of Burmese amber
