= Dingavis =

Dingavis Temporal range: Aptian, 122.1 Ma

Scientific classification
- Kingdom: Animalia
- Phylum: Chordata
- Class: Reptilia
- Clade: Dinosauria
- Clade: Saurischia
- Clade: Theropoda
- Clade: Avialae
- Clade: Ornithuromorpha
- Genus: †Dingavis; O'Connor et al., 2015

Type species
- Dingavis longimaxilla O'Connor et al., 2015

Extinct genus of dinosaurs

Dingavis is an extinct genus of ornithuromorph dinosaurs from the Early Cretaceous of present-day China. It contains a single species, D. longimaxilla.

== Discovery and naming ==
At Sihedang in Liaoning a fossil skeleton was excavated. Catalogued as IVPP V20284, it was found in a layer of the Yixian Formation dating from the Aptian. It consists of an almost complete and associated skeleton with skull, compressed on a plate. It preserves feather remains at the neck. About forty gastroliths have been preserved. It represents an adult individual. The specimen was acquired by the Institute of Vertebrate Paleontology and Paleoanthropology in Beijing. The piece was prepared by Li Dahang.

In 2015 the type species Dingavis longimaxilla was named and described by Jingmai O'Connor, Wang Min and Hu Han. The generic name combines the name of Ding Wenjiang, the "Father of Chinese Geology", with a Latin avis, "bird". The specific name is derived from the Latin longus, "long", and maxilla.

== Description ==
Juehuaornis has a long beak which equals 63 to 65% of the total skull length. The gastroliths are large, with a diameter of 2–4 centimetres (0.79–1.57 in).

== Classification ==
Juehuaornis was placed in the Ornithuromorpha (redefined as a stem-based clade) in 2015. In 2016, it was suggested that Dingavis might be cogeneric to the closely related genera Changzuiornis and Juehuaornis that might have been found in the same formation, in which case Juehuaornis would have priority.
