= Kaririavis =

Kaririavis Temporal range: Aptian

Scientific classification
- Domain: Eukaryota
- Kingdom: Animalia
- Phylum: Chordata
- Clade: Dinosauria
- Clade: Saurischia
- Clade: Theropoda
- Clade: Avialae
- Clade: Ornithuromorpha
- Genus: †Kaririavis; Carvalho et al., 2021
- Species: †K. mater

Binomial name
- †Kaririavis mater Carvalho et al., 2021

Extinct genus of dinosaurs

Kaririavis is an extinct genus of ornithuromorph dinosaurs from the Early Cretaceous Crato Formation of Brazil. It contains one species, K. mater. It is known only from its holotype, which consists of a single foot. Kaririavis is the oldest known ornithuromorph from Gondwana.

== See also ==
- List of bird species described in the 2020s
