= Juehuaornis =

Juehuaornis Temporal range: Aptian, 122.1 Ma

Scientific classification
- Kingdom: Animalia
- Phylum: Chordata
- Class: Reptilia
- Clade: Dinosauria
- Clade: Saurischia
- Clade: Theropoda
- Clade: Avialae
- Clade: Ornithuromorpha
- Genus: †Juehuaornis; Wang et al., 2015

Type species
- Juehuaornis zhangi Wang et al., 2015

Synonyms
- Dingavis longimaxilla? O'Connor et al., 2016; Changzuiornis ahgmi? Huang et al., 2016

Extinct genus of dinosaurs

Juehuaornis is an extinct genus of ornithuromorph dinosaurs from the Early Cretaceous of present-day China. It contains a single species, J. zhangi.

== Discovery and naming ==
The holotype, SJG 00001, was found near Lingyuan in a layer of the Jiufotang Formation dating from the Aptian. It consists of an almost complete and associated skeleton with skull, compressed on a plate. It preserves feather remains. The counterplate was designated as the paratype with inventory number SJG 00001A.

In 2015, the type species Juehuaornis zhangi was named and described by Wang Ren-fe, Wang Yan and Hu Dongyu. The generic name combines a reference to the island of Juehua, the "Chrysanthemum Island" off the coast of Liaoning, with a Greek ὄρνις, ornis, "bird". The specific name honours curator Zhang Dayong.

== Description ==
Juehuaornis has a long beak which reaches 70% of the total skull length.

== Classification ==
Juehuaornis was placed in the Ornithuromorpha in 2015. In 2016 it was suggested that Juehuaornis might be cogeneric to the closely related genera Changzuiornis and Dingavis found in the same formation, in which case Juehuaornis would have priority.
