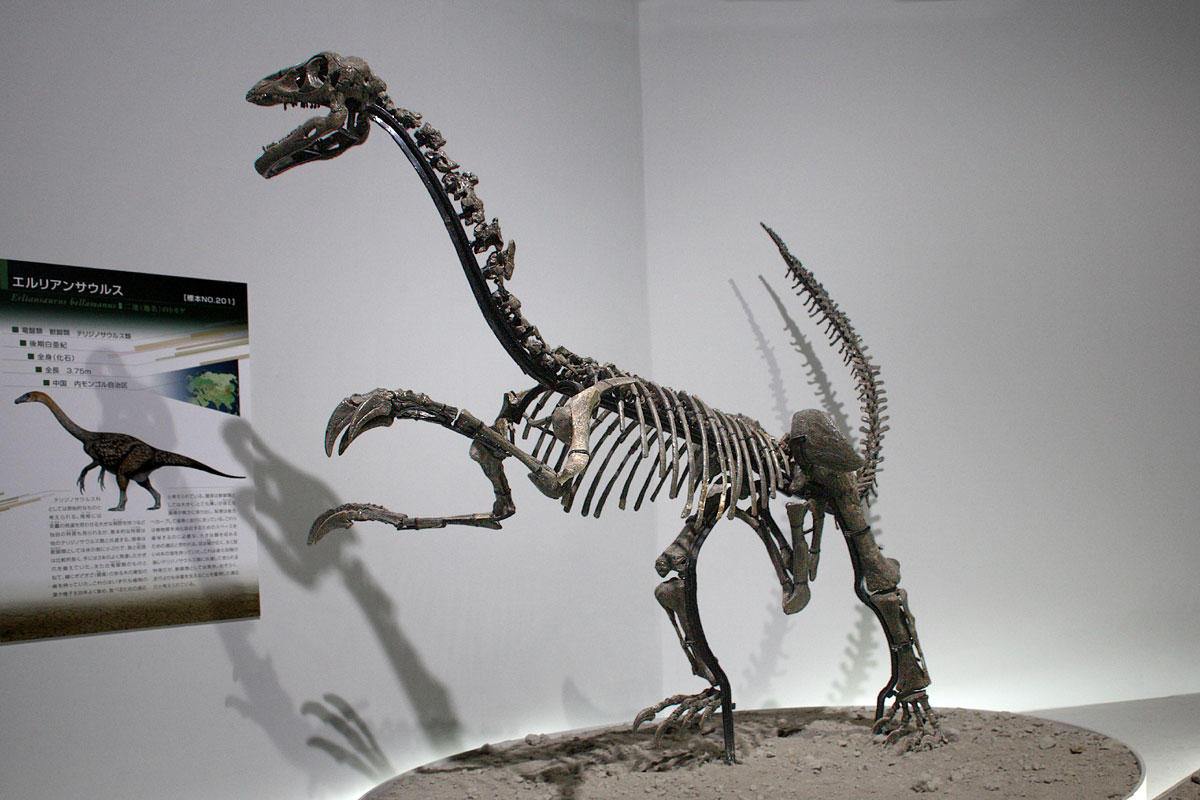
- Mounted skeleton cast

Scientific classification
- Kingdom: Animalia
- Phylum: Chordata
- Class: Reptilia
- Clade: Dinosauria
- Clade: Saurischia
- Clade: Theropoda
- Superfamily: †Therizinosauroidea
- Family: †Therizinosauridae
- Genus: †Erliansaurus; Xu et al., 2002

Type species
- †Erliansaurus bellamanus Xu et al., 2002

= Erliansaurus =

Erliansaurus Temporal range: Late Cretaceous, 85–68 Ma

Extinct genus of dinosaurs

Erliansaurus (meaning "Erlian lizard") is a genus of therizinosaurian theropod dinosaur that lived in Asia during the Late Cretaceous period, around 85–68 million years ago, in the Iren Dabasu Formation, now near Erenhot, Inner Mongolia.

== Discovery and naming ==
Skeletal restoration

The remains of Erliansaurus were found near Sanhangobi in Inner Mongolia in 1999. The type species, Erliansaurus bellamanus, was described by Xu Xing, Zhang Xiaohong, Paul Sereno, Zhao Xijin, Kuang Xuewen, Han Jun and Tan Lin in 2002. The generic name refers to the town of Erlian, and the specific name is derived from Latin bellus, "beautiful", and manus, "hand", in reference to the exquisite preservation of the forelimb.

The holotype, LH V0002, was uncovered in the Iren Dabasu Formation dating from the Santonian stage. It consists of a partial skeleton belonging to a subadult individual. It includes two cervical, one dorsal and two caudal vertebrae; a right scapula; a left forelimb only lacking the carpus; a partial right ilium and a fragmented ischium and pubis; the right femur; both tibiae, a right fibula and partial metatarsals. No skull traces were found.

== Description ==
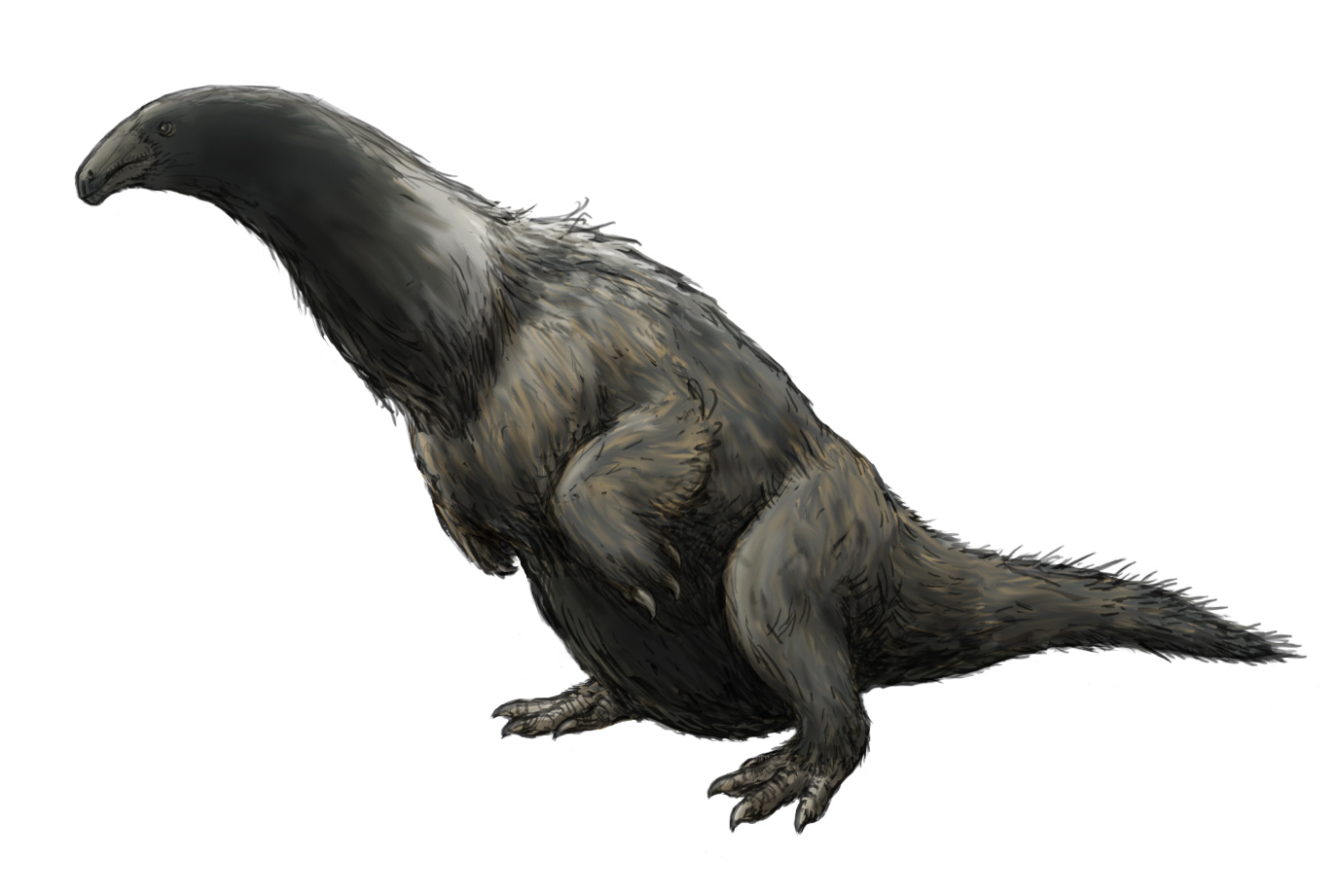
Life restoration

The holotype specimen represents a not fully-grown individual based on one unfused caudal vertebra, and therefore its adult size may be larger than the contemporary Neimongosaurus. It was a small to medium-sized therizinosaur with an estimated length from 2.6 to 4 m (8.5 to 13.1 ft) and a weight of 91 to 400 kg (201 to 882 lb).

Erliansaurus was a bipedal herbivore. For a therizinosauroid, its cervicals were rather short. The preserved femur was very straight and had a very rounded femoral head; it measures 41.2 cm (412 mm). The tibia was relatively elongated, measuring 37.3 cm (373 mm) long. Its fibula had an uncommon form, with a very high front edge and a concave top. The left arm is exceptionally preserved with almost every element intact, its hands bore enormous, strongly recurved and pointed claws of which the thumb claw was the largest, however, the carpal bones are missing.

== Classification ==
Erliansaurus was by the describers assigned to the Therizinosauroidea, in a basal position and likely not a therizinosaurid. The cladistic analysis performed by the revision of Zanno in 2010 recovered it as a therizinosauroid. Some early cladistic analyses however, have recovered it as a basal member of the Therizinosauridae. The cladogram below is the result of the recently performed phylogenetic analysis of the Therizinosauridae by Hartman et al. 2019.

- Therizinosauridae
  - - Suzhousaurus
    - - Neimongosaurus
      - - Therizinosaurus
        - Erliansaurus
  - - Nanchao embryos
    - - Nanshiungosaurus
      - - - Segnosaurus
          - AMNH 6368
        - - Erlikosaurus
          - Nothronychus graffami
          - Nothronychus mckinleyi

== See also ==
- Timeline of therizinosaur research
