= Alamitornis =

Alamitornis Temporal range: Maastrichtian ~70–66 Ma

Scientific classification
- Kingdom: Animalia
- Phylum: Chordata
- Class: Reptilia
- Clade: Dinosauria
- Clade: Saurischia
- Clade: Theropoda
- Clade: Avialae
- Clade: †Patagopterygiformes
- Genus: †Alamitornis; Agnolin & Martinelli 2009
- Species: †A. minutus

Binomial name
- †Alamitornis minutus Agnolin & Martinelli 2009

Extinct genus of dinosaurs

Alamitornis is an extinct genus of basal ornithuromorph dinosaurs, possibly within the family Patagopterygidae. Remains have been found in the Upper Cretaceous Los Alamitos Formation at Los Alamitos, Río Negro Province, Argentina. It was first named by Federico L. Agnolin and Agustín G. Martinelli in 2009 and the type species is Alamitornis minutus.
