= Mengciusornis =

Mengciusornis Temporal range: Aptian

Scientific classification
- Domain: Eukaryota
- Kingdom: Animalia
- Phylum: Chordata
- Clade: Dinosauria
- Clade: Saurischia
- Clade: Theropoda
- Clade: Avialae
- Family: †Schizoouridae
- Genus: †Mengciusornis; Wang et al., 2019
- Species: †M. dentatus

Binomial name
- †Mengciusornis dentatus Wang et al., 2019

Extinct genus of dinosaurs

Mengciusornis is an extinct genus of basal ornithuromorph dinosaurs from the Early Cretaceous of China. It contains one species, M. dentatus, remains of which have been found in the Jiufotang Formation. Together with the closely related Schizooura it makes up the family Schizoouridae.

== Description ==
Mengciusornis is known from a single specimen, IVPP V26275, a well-preserved skeleton with remains of feathers. Unlike its sister genus Schizooura, which was toothless, Mengciusornis possessed large, curved teeth on its premaxillae, similar to those of the distantly related Longipteryx.

== Etymology ==
The generic name honours the Chinese philosopher Mencius, while the specific epithet is Latin for "toothed".
