= Kuszholia =

Kuszholia Temporal range: Coniacian 90–86 Ma

Scientific classification
- Kingdom: Animalia
- Phylum: Chordata
- Class: Reptilia
- Clade: Dinosauria
- Clade: Saurischia
- Clade: Theropoda
- Clade: Avialae
- Clade: †Enantiornithes
- Family: †Kuszholiidae; Nesov, 1992
- Genus: †Kuszholia; Nesov, 1992
- Species: †K. mengi

Binomial name
- †Kuszholia mengi Nesov, 1992

Extinct genus of birds

Kuszholia (meaning "Milky Way bird" after the Kazakh term for the Milky Way, құс жолы qus jolı) is the name given to a genus of primitive birds or bird-like dinosaurs from the Late Cretaceous.

== History ==
Fossils were found in the Bissekty Formation in the Kyzyl Kum desert of Bukhara Province, in Uzbekistan; these have been described as vertebrae from a "chicken-sized" animal. These fossils were described by Russian paleontologist Lev Alexandrovich Nesov in 1992.

The fossils date to the Coniacian age or stage of the Late Cretaceous, in the geologic timescale, between 89.8 ± 1 Ma and 86.3 ± 0.7 Ma (million years ago). The holotype specimen is catalogued as PO 4602 (originally PO 3486).

== Classification ==
Kuszholia were possibly coelurosaurs close to the ancestry of birds, although most scientists have considered the fossils as belonging to an avialan (either a primitive ornithuran or enantiornithine).

The genus contains a single species, K. mengi; a separate family has been erected for it (Kuszholiidae). It is known only from a series of small vertebrae, with prominent hollow chambers (pneumaticity).

Later, Kuszholia was placed in the clade Patagopterygiformes.
