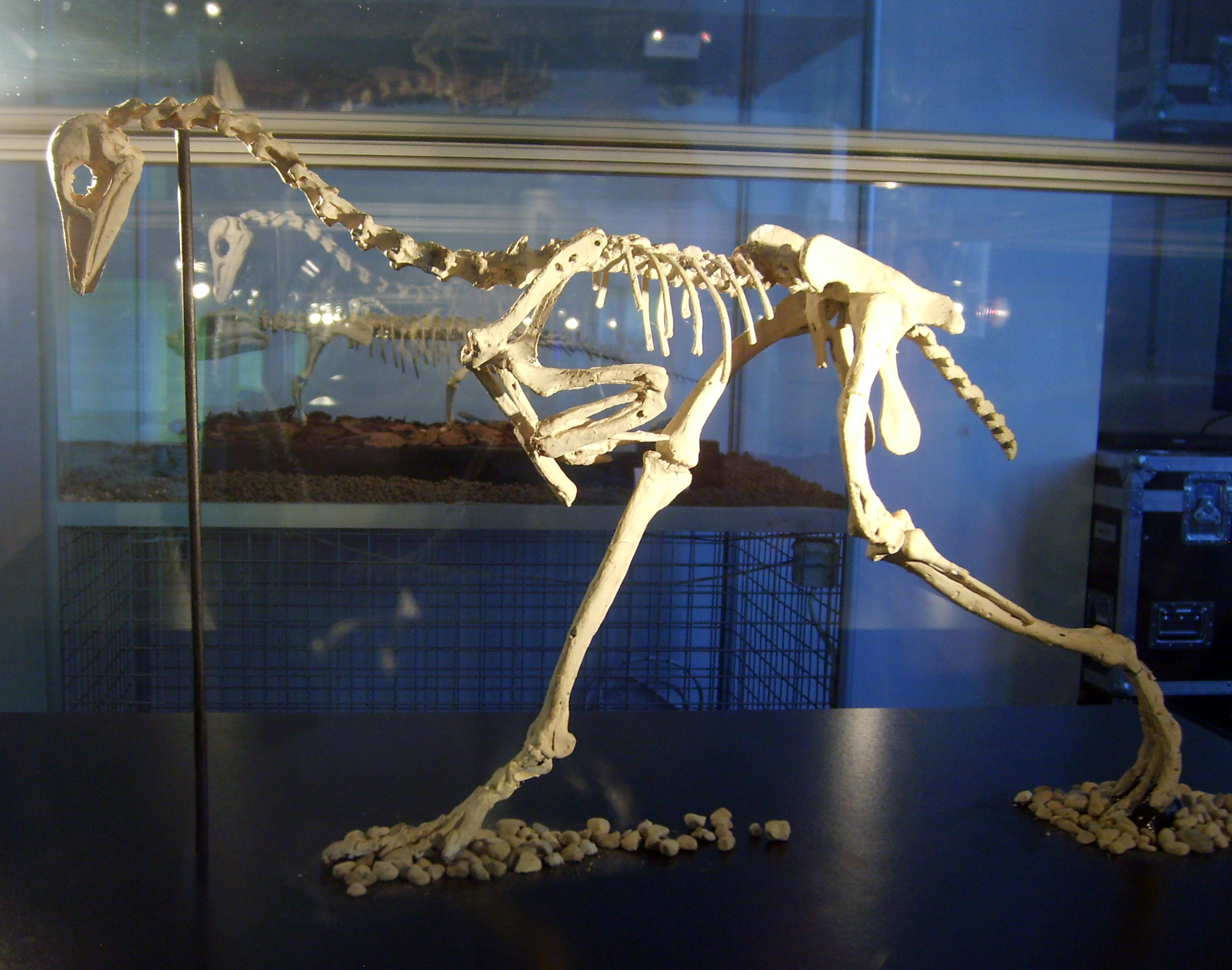
- Skeleton restoration of Patagopteryx deferrariisi

Scientific classification
- Kingdom: Animalia
- Phylum: Chordata
- Class: Reptilia
- Clade: Dinosauria
- Clade: Saurischia
- Clade: Theropoda
- Clade: Avialae
- Clade: Euornithes
- Clade: †Patagopterygiformes; Alvarenga & Bonaparte 1992

Subgroups
- †Alamitornis; †Kuszholia?; †Patagopteryx

= Patagopterygiformes =

Patagopterygiforms Temporal range: Late Cretaceous, 85–66 Ma

Extinct clade of dinosaurs

Patagopterygiformes is an extinct group of large terrestrial ornithuromorph dinosaurs from the Late Cretaceous of South America. It contains at most three genera: Patagopteryx, Alamitornis and possibly Kuszholia.
