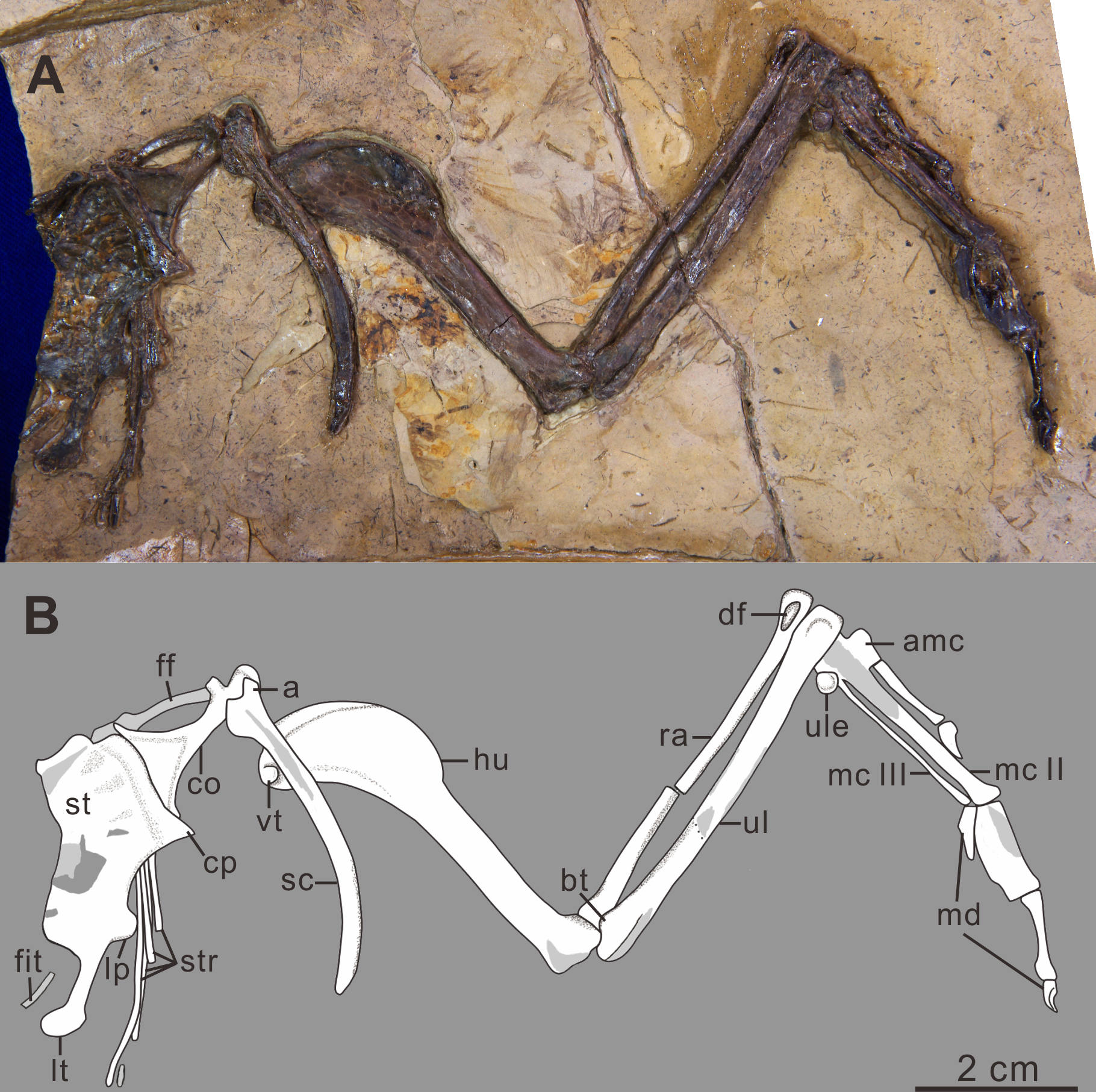
- Holotype

Scientific classification
- Kingdom: Animalia
- Phylum: Chordata
- Class: Reptilia
- Clade: Dinosauria
- Clade: Saurischia
- Clade: Theropoda
- Clade: Avialae
- Clade: Ornithuromorpha
- Genus: †Yumenornis; Wang et al., 2013

Type species
- †Yumenornis huangi Wang et al., 2013

= Yumenornis =

Yumenornis Temporal range: Early Cretaceous

Extinct genus of dinosaurs

Yumenornis is an extinct genus of basal ornithuromorph dinosaurs known from the Early Cretaceous Xiagou Formation of Changma Basin, Gansu Province of northwestern China. Yumenornis was first named by Ya-Ming Wang, Jingmai O'Connor, Da-Qing Li and Hai-Lu You in 2013 and the type species is Yumenornis huangi.
