= Meemannavis =

Meemannavis Temporal range: Early Cretaceous, Aptian (~125–113 Ma)

Scientific classification
- Kingdom: Animalia
- Phylum: Chordata
- Class: Reptilia
- Clade: Dinosauria
- Clade: Saurischia
- Clade: Theropoda
- Clade: Avialae
- Clade: Euornithes
- Clade: Ornithuromorpha
- Genus: †Meemannavis; O' Connor et al., 2021
- Species: †M. ductrix

Binomial name
- †Meemannavis ductrix O'Connor et al., 2021

Extinct genus of dinosaurs

Meemannavis (meaning "Meemann’s bird") is a genus of ornithuromorph dinosaurs from the Early Cretaceous (Aptian) Xiagou Formation of Gansu Province, China. The genus contains a single species, Meemannavis ductrix, known from a partial skeleton including an incomplete skull and cervical and thoracic vertebrae. The lower jaw and tip of the upper jaw of the Meemannavis holotype are toothless, but it may have had teeth nearer the back of the upper jaw.

== Naming ==
The generic name, "Meemannavis," combines a reference to Meemann Chang, a Chinese paleontologist, with the Latin "avis," meaning "bird." The specific name, "ductrix," is derived from the Latin "ductor," meaning "leader," in reference to Chang's position as the first female director of the IVPP.
