= Bellulornis =

Bellulornis Temporal range: Early Cretaceous, ~122–118 Ma

Scientific classification
- Kingdom: Animalia
- Phylum: Chordata
- Class: Reptilia
- Clade: Dinosauria
- Clade: Saurischia
- Clade: Theropoda
- Clade: Avialae
- Clade: Ornithuromorpha
- Genus: †Bellulornis; Wang, Zhou, & Zhou, 2016

Type species
- †Bellulornis rectusunguis Wang, Zhou, & Zhou, 2016

Synonyms
- Bellulia rectusunguis (preoccupied name)

Extinct genus of dinosaurs

Bellulornis ("beautiful bird") is an extinct genus of ornithuromorph avialan. It is known from a complete postcranial skeleton lacking the skull which was unearthed from the rocks of the Early Cretaceous-aged Jiufotang Formation in Liaoning Province, China. It was originally given the genus name Bellulia, meaning "beautiful", in reference to the fact that the skeleton was preserved in a pose reminiscent of a dancer. However, it was discovered after publication that the genus Bellulia was preoccupied by an extant moth. The authors then amended the name to Bellulornis, adding the Ancient Greek suffix meaning "bird".
