= Eurycoleus =

Scientific classification
- Domain: Eukaryota
- Kingdom: Animalia
- Phylum: Arthropoda
- Class: Insecta
- Order: Coleoptera
- Suborder: Adephaga
- Family: Carabidae
- Subfamily: Lebiinae
- Tribe: Lebiini
- Subtribe: Pericalina
- Genus: Eurycoleus; Chaudoir, 1848

Genus of beetles

Eurycoleus is a genus in the beetle family Carabidae. There are about nine described species in Eurycoleus, found in Central and South America.

== Species ==
These nine species belong to the genus Eurycoleus:

- Eurycoleus erwini Shpeley & Ball, 2000 (Costa Rica)
- Eurycoleus fofus Reichardt, 1976 (Colombia)
- Eurycoleus macularius (Chevrolat, 1835) (Colombia, Panama, Nicaragua, Guatemala, and Mexico)
- Eurycoleus octosignatus Bates, 1883 (Mexico)
- Eurycoleus ornatus Bates, 1883 (Mexico)
- Eurycoleus panamensis Hovorka, 2008 (Panama)
- Eurycoleus poecilopterus (Buquet, 1835) (Venezuela, French Guiana, and Brazil)
- Eurycoleus septemplagiatus Chaudoir, 1877 (Brazil)
- Eurycoleus tredecimpunctatus Chaudoir, 1870 (Brazil, Costa Rica, Nicaragua, Guatemala, and Mexico)
