= Brevidentavis =

Brevidentavis Temporal range: Early Cretaceous, Aptian (~125–113 Ma)

Scientific classification
- Kingdom: Animalia
- Phylum: Chordata
- Class: Reptilia
- Clade: Dinosauria
- Clade: Saurischia
- Clade: Theropoda
- Clade: Avialae
- Clade: Euornithes
- Clade: Ornithuromorpha
- Genus: †Brevidentavis; O' Connor et al., 2021
- Species: †B. zhangi

Binomial name
- †Brevidentavis zhangi O'Connor et al., 2021

Extinct genus of dinosaurs

Brevidentavis (meaning "short-toothed bird") is a genus of ornithuromorph dinosaurs from the Early Cretaceous (Aptian) Xiagou Formation of Gansu Province, China. The genus contains a single species, Brevidentavis zhangi, known from a specimen including a partial skull and cervical vertebrae. The Brevidentavis holotype shows unusually blunt teeth in its lower jaw, which the describing authors suggest may indicate a specialized diet. Its dentition shows similarities with those of hesperornitheans, and indeed it may be an early member of that group.

== Etymology ==
The generic name, "Brevidentavis", combines the Latin "brevis," meaning "short," "dent," meaning "tooth," and "avis," meaning "bird." The specific name, "zhangi", honors Zhang Xing, who was involved in the expedition where the holotype fossil was discovered.
