= Dunhuangia =

Dunhuangia Temporal range: Aptian

Scientific classification
- Domain: Eukaryota
- Kingdom: Animalia
- Phylum: Chordata
- Clade: Dinosauria
- Clade: Saurischia
- Clade: Theropoda
- Clade: Avialae
- Clade: Ornithothoraces
- Clade: †Enantiornithes
- Clade: †Euenantiornithes
- Genus: †Dunhuangia; Wang et al., 2015

Extinct genus of birds

Dunhuangia is a bird genus, belonging to the Enantiornithes, which during the Early Cretaceous lived in the area of present China.

In 2015, Wang Min, Li Daqing, Jingmai Kathleen O'Connor, Zhou Zhonghe and You Hailu named and described the type species Dunhuangia cuii. The generic name refers to the city of Dunhuang in Gansu province. The specific name honours preparator Cui Guihia.

The holotype, GSGM-05-CM-030, was found in the Changma Basin, in a layer of the Xiagou Formation dating from the Aptian. It consists of a partial skeleton lacking the skull. It contains the forelimbs, shoulder girdle and sternum. It is partly articulated.

Dunhuangia is a medium-sized enantiornithean.

The describing authors established some autapomorphies, unique derived traits. The rear edge of the sternum has a pair of large notches, equalling over half of the length of the entire element. The coracoid has a deep trough in the top, bordered on the outside by a thick ridge which forms the vertically low outer bone wall of the element.

Dunhuanagia was placed in the Enantiornithes, as sister species of Fortunguavis. It is only the second enantiornithean species named from the Changma Basin of which the bird fauna largely consists of Ornithuromorpha. This can be explained by the fact that the basin consists of coastal deposits while Enantiornithes are arboreal species.
