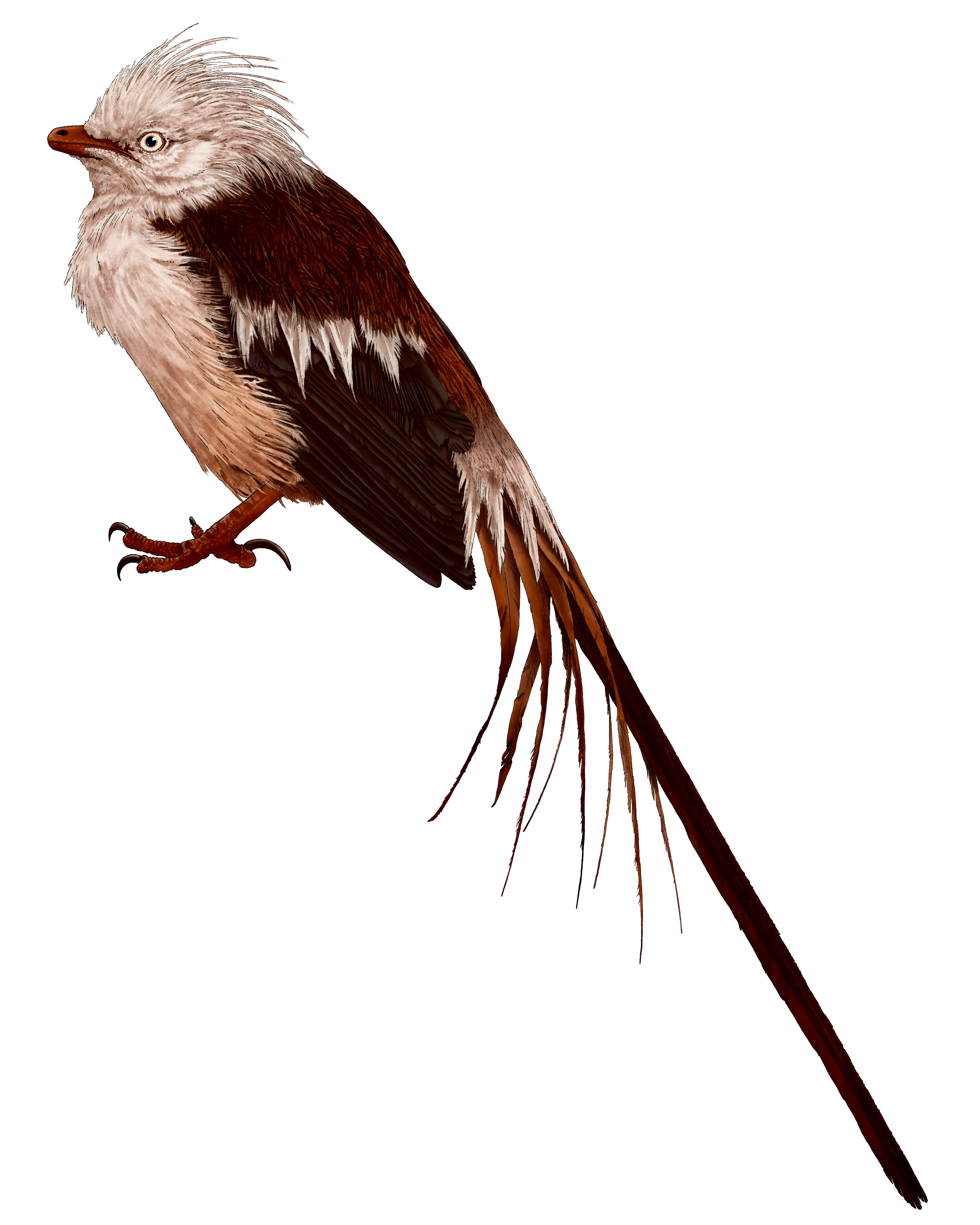
- Life restoration of Feitianius paradisi.

Scientific classification
- Kingdom: Animalia
- Phylum: Chordata
- Class: Reptilia
- Clade: Dinosauria
- Clade: Saurischia
- Clade: Theropoda
- Clade: Avialae
- Clade: Pygostylia
- Clade: Ornithothoraces
- Clade: †Enantiornithes
- Genus: †Feitianius; O'Connor et al., 2015

Type species
- Feitianius paradisi O'Connor et al., 2015

= Feitianius =

Feitianius Temporal range: Early Cretaceous, 124–120 Ma

Genus of birds

Feitianius is a bird genus, belonging to the Enantiornithes, that during the Early Cretaceous lived in the area of modern China. A single species has been named in the genus, Feitianius paradisi.

In 2005, fragmentary enantiornithean fossils were excavated near Changma, in Gansu. Two of the best preserved were reported in the scientific literature in 2009.

In 2015, the type species Feitianius paradisi was named and described by Jingmai Kathleen O’Connor, Li Daqing, Matthew C. Lamanna, Wang Min, Jerald D. Harris, Jessie Atterholt and You Hailou. The generic name has been derived from the feitian, a flying apsara or nymph from Buddhist mythology. Historical murals featuring such nymphs are common in the caves around Changma. The name was made masculine "for fun" because it was concluded that the type specimen was a male individual. The specific name means "from paradise" in Latin and refers to the similar sexual dimorphism in the tail feathers of birds-of-paradise. The species name as a whole thus means "feitian of paradise", the translation of the Chinese 飛天/飞天.

The holotype, GSGM-05-CM-004, was found in a layer of the Xiagou Formation dating from the early Aptian. It consists of the hind part of a skeleton on a stone plate. The skeleton is visible from the left side. It is articulated but the part in front of the middle back is lacking. It preserves extensive remains of the soft tissues, including the plumage.

A hint of the size of Feitianius is given by the length of the thighbone, twenty-seven millimetres.

A single unique feature was established for Feitianius: the tail plumage contains three distinct feather types whereas all known relatives have tails with a single type of feather.

Soft tissue remains are preserved around the tail base. These seem to represent a fleshy structure similar to the "parson's nose" of modern birds, in which the tail feathers are embedded. Collagen bands are visible running perpendicular to the body outline. These bands have a length of seven to eight millimetres and a width of about half a millimetre.

On the belly and the front tail base short downy covert feathers are visible. More to behind the feathers of the tail base are gradually changing into longer structures, a dozen of which are clearly visible. Uniquely for the Enantiornithes, among these three morphotypes can be distinguished. Morphotype A consists of feathers that are forty to forty-five millimetres long. They have vanes that cover the distal 55% of the rachis. Morphotype B is eighteen millimetres long and half as wide as morphotype A. Here, the vanes cover the full length of the rachis. Both types are pennaceous and somewhat curved downwards. Of morphotype C only a single rachis has been preserved. It is very long and its distal end has been lost on the fossil. The describing authors concluded that it was one of a pair of very long central "streamers" having a display function, probably for a male individual. It was considered unlikely that the tail feathers had an important aerodynamic effect. It is possible that the shorter morphotype A and B feathers formed a differentially coloured tuft on the tail base. Because of a varnish applied to the fossil, it can no longer be checked for colouring melanosomes though. The ornamental structure as a whole might have resembled that of the extant greater bird-of-paradise.

Feitianius was in 2016 placed in the Enantiornithes. A cladistic analysis showed it to be part of a polytomy with Qiliania and other enantiornithean specimens of the Changma Basin.
