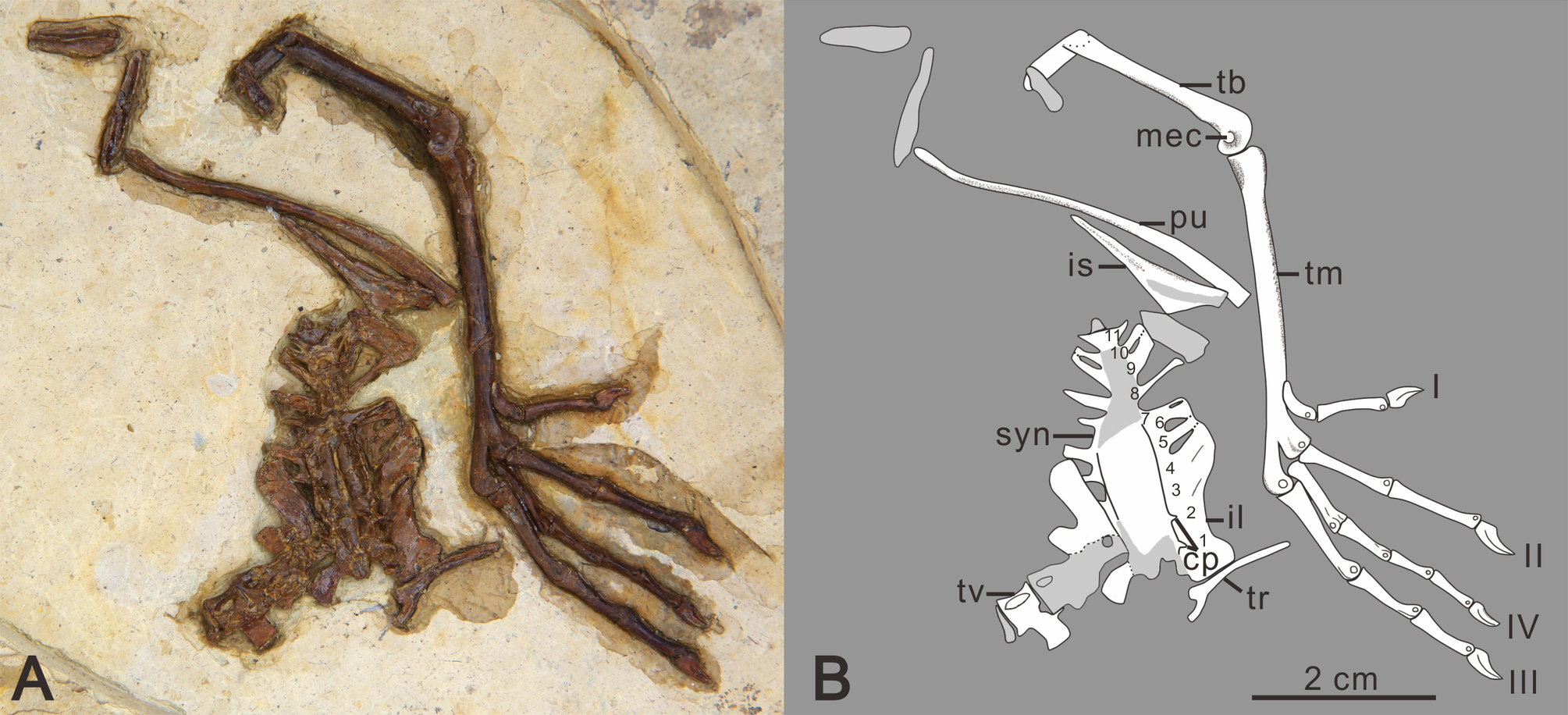
- Holotype

Scientific classification
- Kingdom: Animalia
- Phylum: Chordata
- Class: Reptilia
- Clade: Dinosauria
- Clade: Saurischia
- Clade: Theropoda
- Clade: Avialae
- Clade: Ornithuromorpha
- Genus: †Changmaornis; Wang et al., 2013

Type species
- †Changmaornis houi Wang et al., 2013

= Changmaornis =

Changmaornis Temporal range: Early Cretaceous

Extinct genus of dinosaurs

Changmaornis is an extinct genus of basal ornithuromorph dinosaur known from the Early Cretaceous Xiagou Formation of Changma Basin, Gansu Province of northwestern China. Changmaornis was first named by Ya-Ming Wang, Jingmai K. O'Connor, Da-Qing Li and Hai-Lu You in 2013 and the type species is Changmaornis houi.
