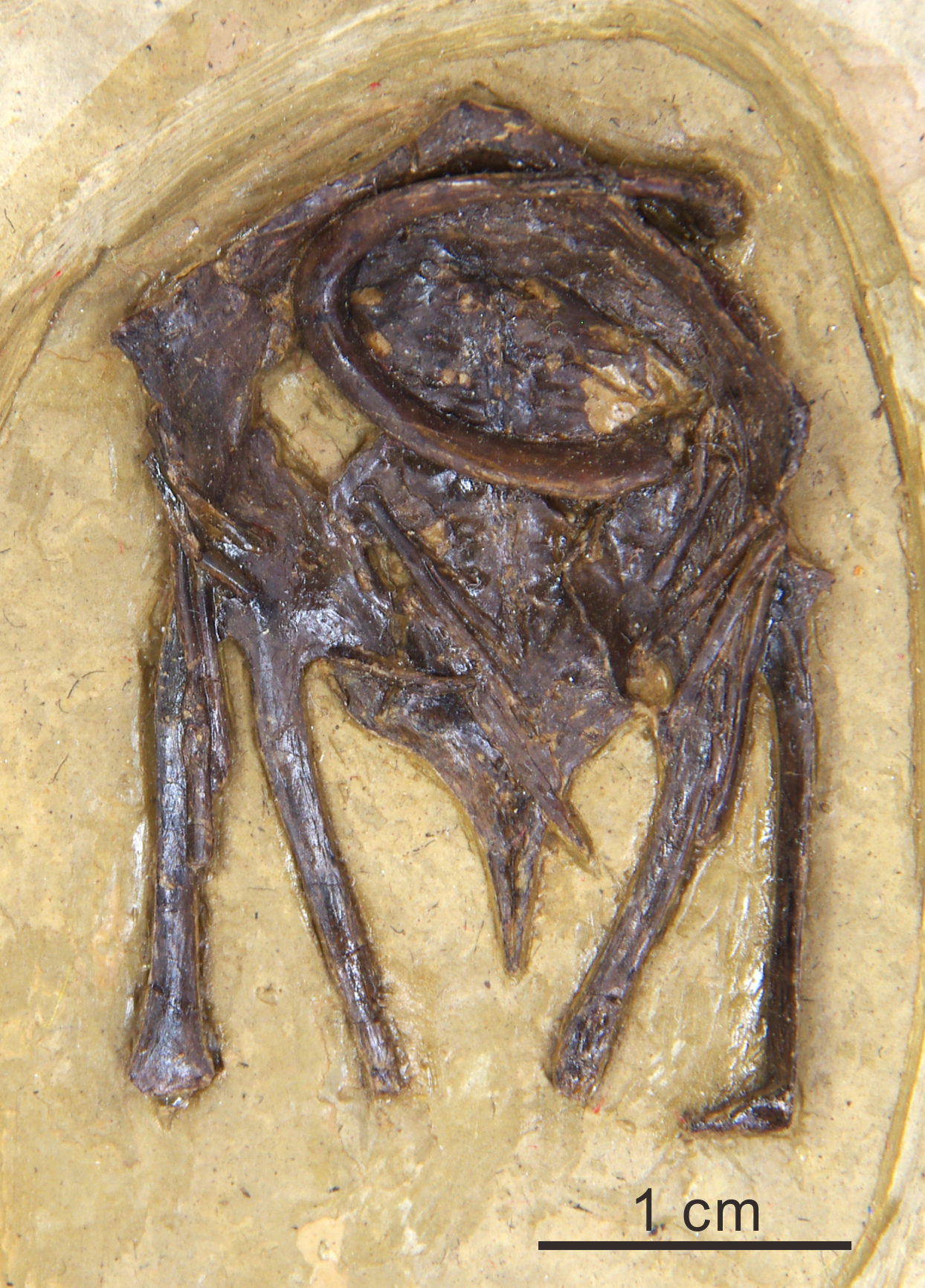
- Holotype

Scientific classification
- Kingdom: Animalia
- Phylum: Chordata
- Class: Reptilia
- Clade: Dinosauria
- Clade: Saurischia
- Clade: Theropoda
- Clade: Avialae
- Clade: Ornithuromorpha
- Genus: †Jiuquanornis; Wang et al., 2013

Type species
- †Jiuquanornis niui Wang et al., 2013

= Jiuquanornis =

Jiuquanornis Temporal range: Early Cretaceous

Extinct genus of dinosaurs

Jiuquanornis is an extinct genus of basal ornithuromorph dinosaur known from the Early Cretaceous Xiagou Formation of Changma Basin, Gansu Province of northwestern China. Jiuquanornis was first named by Ya-Ming Wang, Jingmai K. O'Connor, Da-Qing Li and Hai-Lu You in 2013 and the type species is Jiuquanornis niui.
