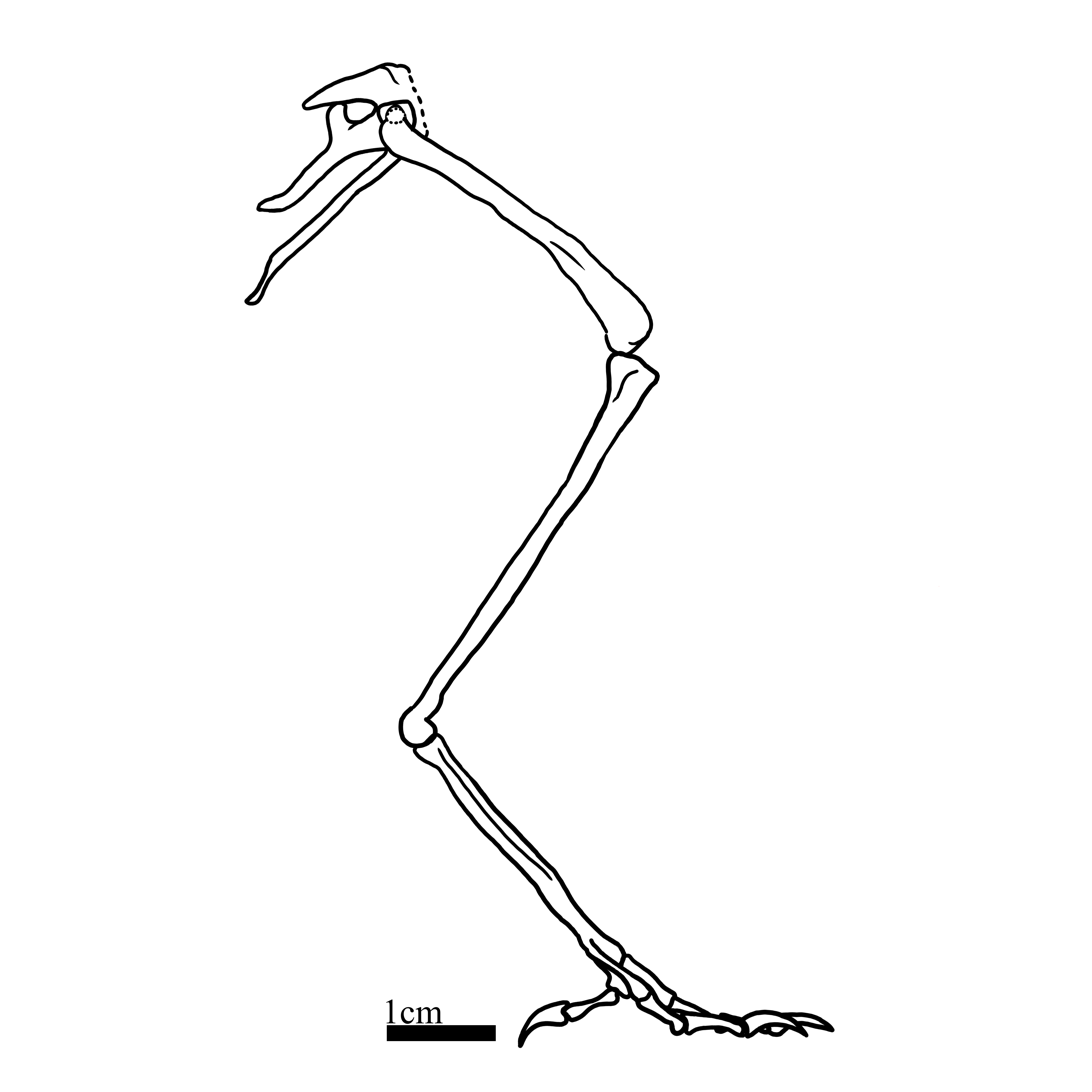
- Holotype with bones shown articulated

Scientific classification
- Kingdom: Animalia
- Phylum: Chordata
- Class: Reptilia
- Clade: Dinosauria
- Clade: Saurischia
- Clade: Theropoda
- Clade: Avialae
- Clade: †Enantiornithes
- Genus: †Qiliania; Ji et al., 2011
- Species: †Q. graffini

Binomial name
- †Qiliania graffini Ji et al., 2011

= Qiliania =

Qiliania Temporal range: Early Cretaceous, 120 Ma

Extinct genus of birds

Qiliania (from the Xiongnu qilian, "heaven") is an extinct genus of early bird from the lower Cretaceous (Aptian stage) about 120 million years ago. It is an enantiornithean which lived in what is now Gansu Province, north-western China. It is known from two incomplete, semi-articulated and three-dimensionally preserved skeletons, which were found in the Xiagou Formation of the Changma Basin. It was first named by Shu-An Ji, Jessie Atterholt, Jingmai O'Connor, Matthew Lamanna, Jerry Harrs, Li Da-Qing, You Hai-Lu and Peter Dodson in 2011 and the type species is Qiliania graffini. The species was named for Greg Graffin, a paleontologist and member of the punk rock group Bad Religion, at the suggestion of coauthor Jingmai O'Connor, a longtime fan of the band.
