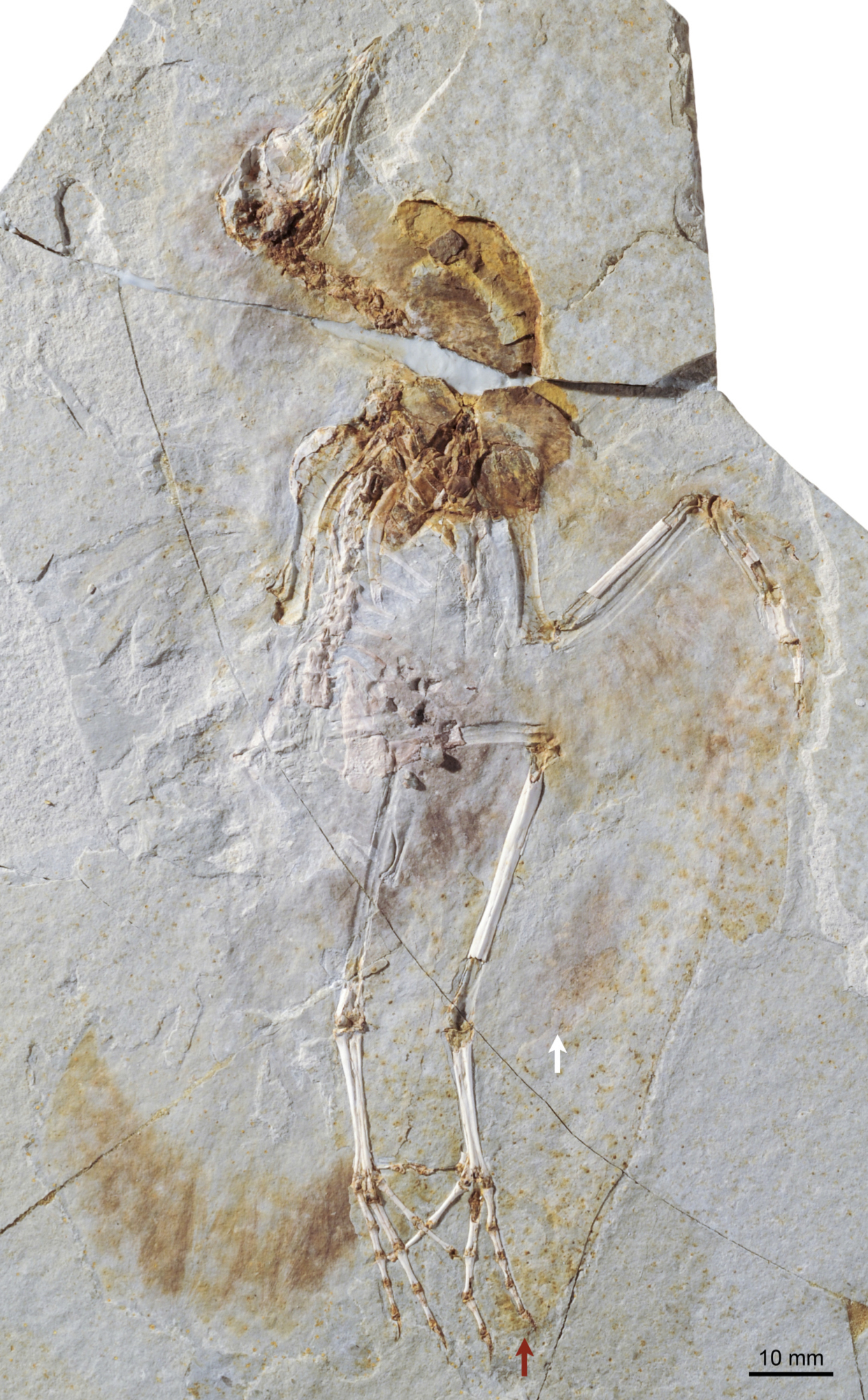
- Fossil specimen of Hongshanornis longicresta
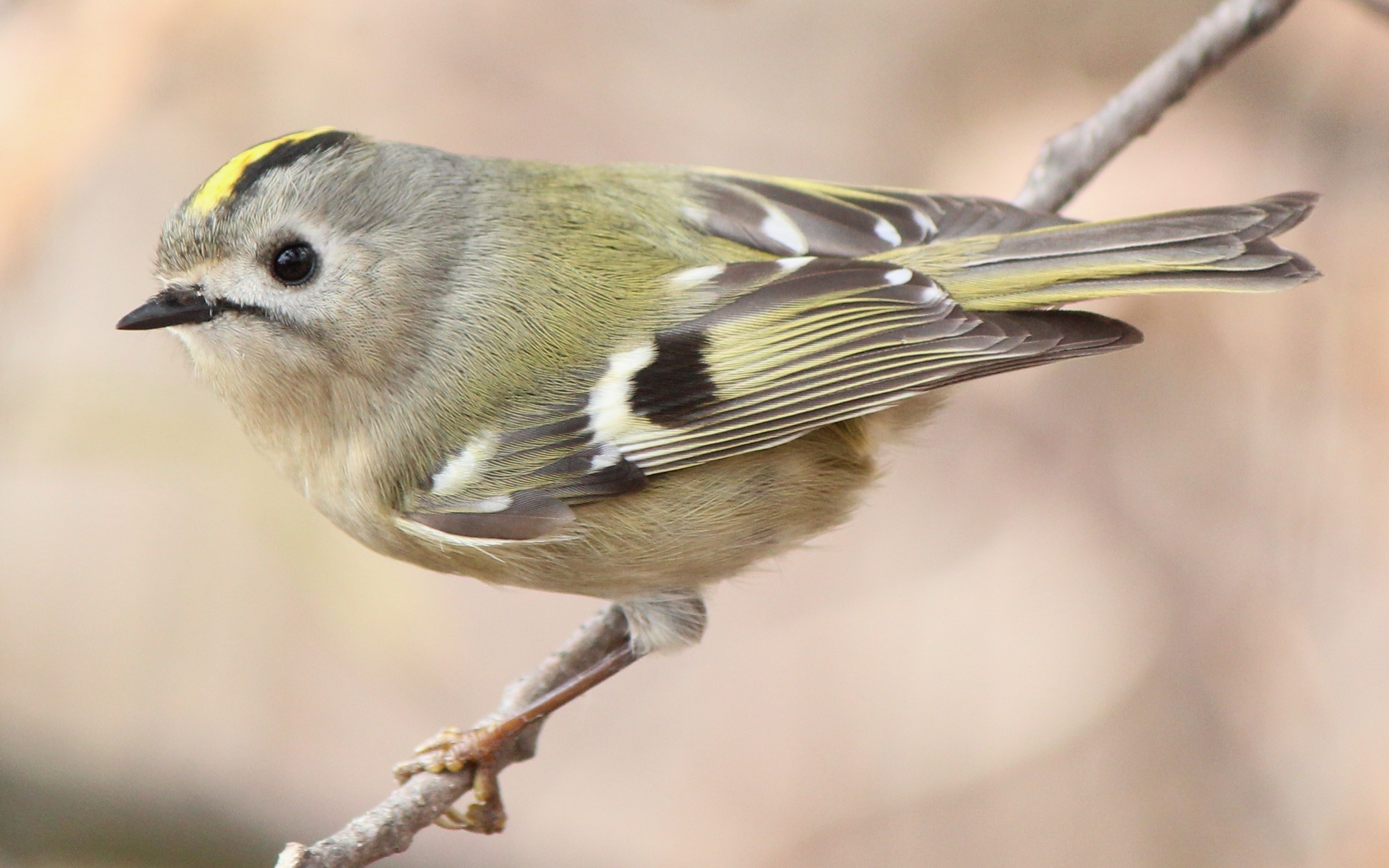
- Goldcrest (Regulus regulus)

Scientific classification
- Kingdom: Animalia
- Phylum: Chordata
- Class: Reptilia
- Clade: Dinosauria
- Clade: Saurischia
- Clade: Theropoda
- Clade: Avialae
- Clade: Ornithothoraces
- Clade: Euornithes; Stejneger, 1884

Subgroups
- †Archaeorhynchus; †Chaoyangia; †Kunpengornis; †Jianchangornis; †Zhongjianornis; †Schizoouridae; Ornithuromorpha Chiappe et al., 1999; †Bellulornis; †Brevidentavis; †Changmaornis; †Dingavis; †Eogranivora; †Gallornis; †Hollanda; †Horezmavis; †Iteravis; †Jiuquanornis; †Juehuaornis; †Kaririavis; †Meemannavis; †Vorona; †Yumenornis; †Ambiortiformes; †Gansuidae; †Patagopterygiformes; †Yanornithiformes; Ornithurae

= Euornithes =

Euornithes Temporal range: Early Cretaceous–Present, 130.7–0 Ma

Clade of dinosaurs

Euornithes (from the Greek word ευόρνιθες euórnithes meaning "true birds") is a natural group which includes the most recent common ancestor of all avialans closer to modern birds than to the enantiornithines. This group was defined in the PhyloCode by Juan Benito and colleagues in 2022 as "the largest clade containing Vultur gryphus, but not Enantiornis leali and Cathayornis yandica".

== Description ==
Clarke et al. (2006) found that the most primitive known euornithians (the Yanornithiformes) had a mosaic of advanced and primitive features. These species retained primitive features like gastralia and a pubic symphysis. They also showed the first fully modern pygostyles, and the type specimen of Yixianornis (IVPP 13631) preserves eight elongated rectrices (tail feathers) in a modern arrangement. No earlier pygostylians are known which preserve a fan of tail feathers of this sort; instead, they showed only paired plumes or a tuft of short feathers.

== Classification ==
The name Euornithes has been used for a wide variety of avialan groups since it was first named by Leonhard Stejneger in 1884. It was first defined as a clade in 1998 by Paul Sereno, who made it the group of all animals closer to birds than to Enantiornithes (represented by Sinornis). This definition currently includes similar content as another widely used name, Ornithuromorpha, named and defined by Luis Chiappe in 1999 as the common ancestor of Patagopteryx, Vorona, and Ornithurae, plus all of its descendants. Because one definition is node-based and the other branch-based, Ornithuromorpha is a slightly less inclusive group.

=== Relationships ===
The cladogram below follows the results of a phylogenetic analysis by Lee et al., 2014:

- Ornithothoraces
  - †Enantiornithes
  - Euornithes
    - †Archaeorhynchus
    - - †Jianchangornis
      - - †Zhongjianornis
        - - †Chaoyangia
          - - †Schizooura
            - Ornithuromorpha
              - - †Patagopteryx
                - †Vorona
              - - †Ambiortus
                - - †Songlingornithidae
                  - - †Hongshanornithidae
                    - - †Apsaravis
                      - - †Gansus
                        - - †Hollanda
                          - Ornithurae
                            - †Ichthyornis
                            - - †Hesperornithes
                              - - †Limenavis
                                - Aves (modern birds)

The following cladogram below follows the results of a phylogenetic analysis by Pei et al., 2020:

- Avialae
  - † Anchiornithidae
    - † Xiaotingia
    - - † Aurornis
      - † Eosinopteryx
      - † Anchiornis
  - - †Archaeopteryx
    - - †Sapeornis
      - - †Jeholornis
        - - †Jixiangornis
          - Pygostylia
            - †Confuciusornis
            - - † Enantiornithes
              - Euornithes
                - †Patagopteryx
                - - †Hongshanornis
                  - - †Yanornis
                    - - †Yixianornis
                      - - †Apsaravis
                        - Ornithurae

=== Other genera ===
The following is a list of primitive euornithian genera and those that cannot be confidently referred to any subgroups, following Holtz (2011) unless otherwise noted.

- †Alamitornis
- †Changmaornis
- †Changzuiornis
- †Dingavis
- †Gargantuavis
- †Horezmavis
- †Iteravis
- †Juehuaornis
- †Platanavis
- †Wyleyia?
- †Yumenornis
- †Xinghaiornis
- †Zhyraornis

Note that Holtz also included the genera Eurolimnornis and Piksi as euornitheans, though they have since been re-identified as pterosaurs.
