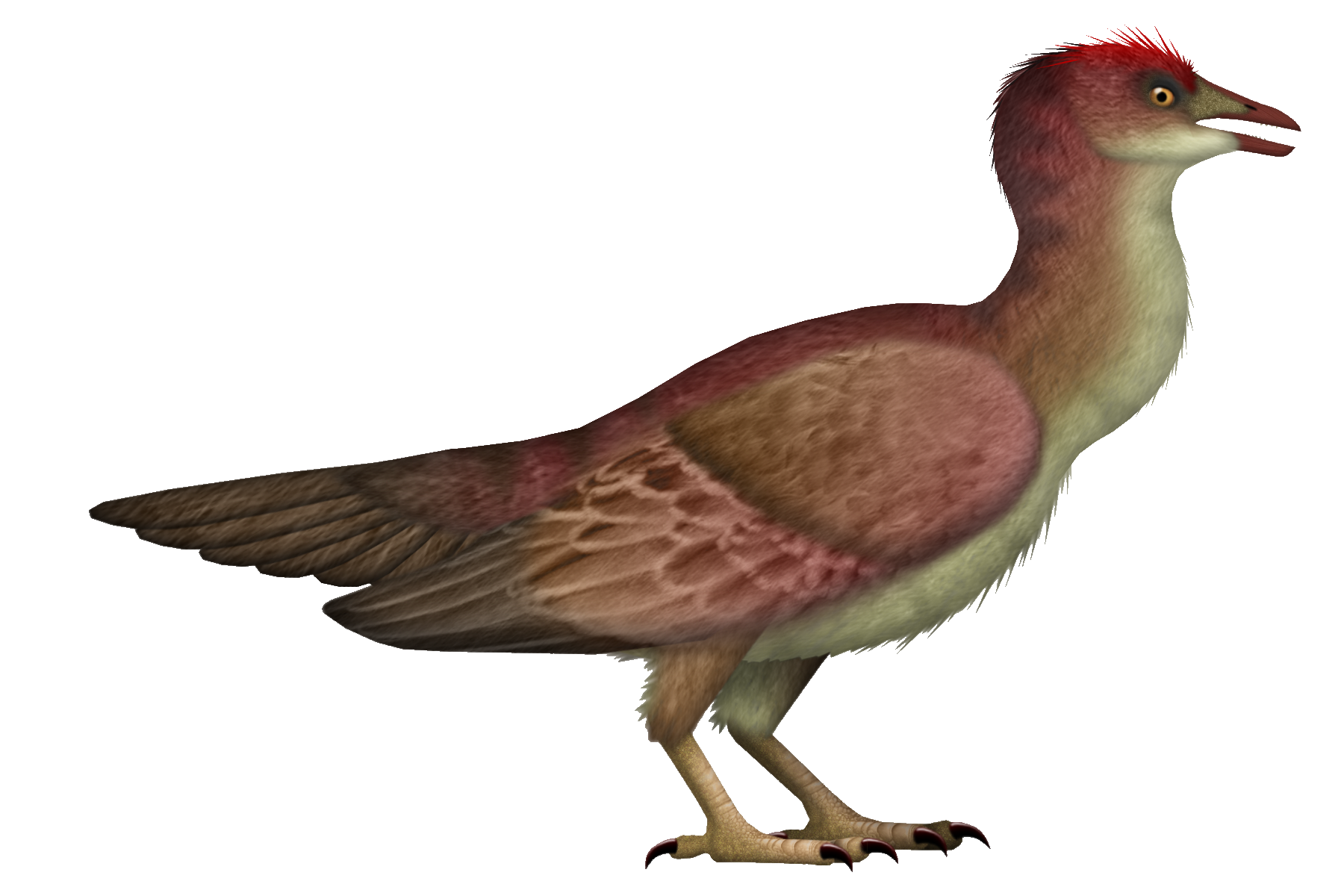
- Speculative life restoration of Kunpengornis

Scientific classification
- Kingdom: Animalia
- Phylum: Chordata
- Class: Reptilia
- Clade: Dinosauria
- Clade: Saurischia
- Clade: Theropoda
- Clade: Avialae
- Clade: Euornithes
- Genus: †Kunpengornis; Huang et al., 2026
- Species: †K. anhuimusei

Binomial name
- †Kunpengornis anhuimusei Huang et al., 2026

= Kunpengornis =

Kunpengornis Temporal range: Early Cretaceous, Aptian

Extinct bird genus

Kunpengornis (meaning "Kunpeng bird") is an extinct genus of euornithean birds known from the Early Cretaceous (Aptian age) Jiufotang Formation of Liaoning Province, China. The genus contains a single species, Kunpengornis anhuimusei, known from a nearly complete and articulated skeleton. Fish bones preserved in the abdominal cavity indicate that Kunpengornis was piscivorous.

== Discovery and naming ==
Kunpengornis type locality in Liaoning, China

The Kunpengornis holotype specimen, AGB 15483, was discovered by a farmer in outcrops of the Jiufotang Formation, who donated it to Anhui Geological Museum in 2023 to be researched, where it is now accessioned. It was found near Lamadong in Jianchang County of Liaoning Province, China. The specimen consists of almost all of the skeleton in anatomical articulation, preserved on a single slab.

In 2026, Huang and colleagues described Kunpengornis anhuimusei as a new genus and species of euornithean birds based on these fossil remains. The generic name, Kunpengornis, combines a reference to the mythical Chinese Kunpeng—known for its ability to transform into either a fish or a giant bird—with the Greek ornis, meaning "bird". The specific name, anhuimusei, references the Anhui Geological Museum, which houses the holotype.

== Classification ==
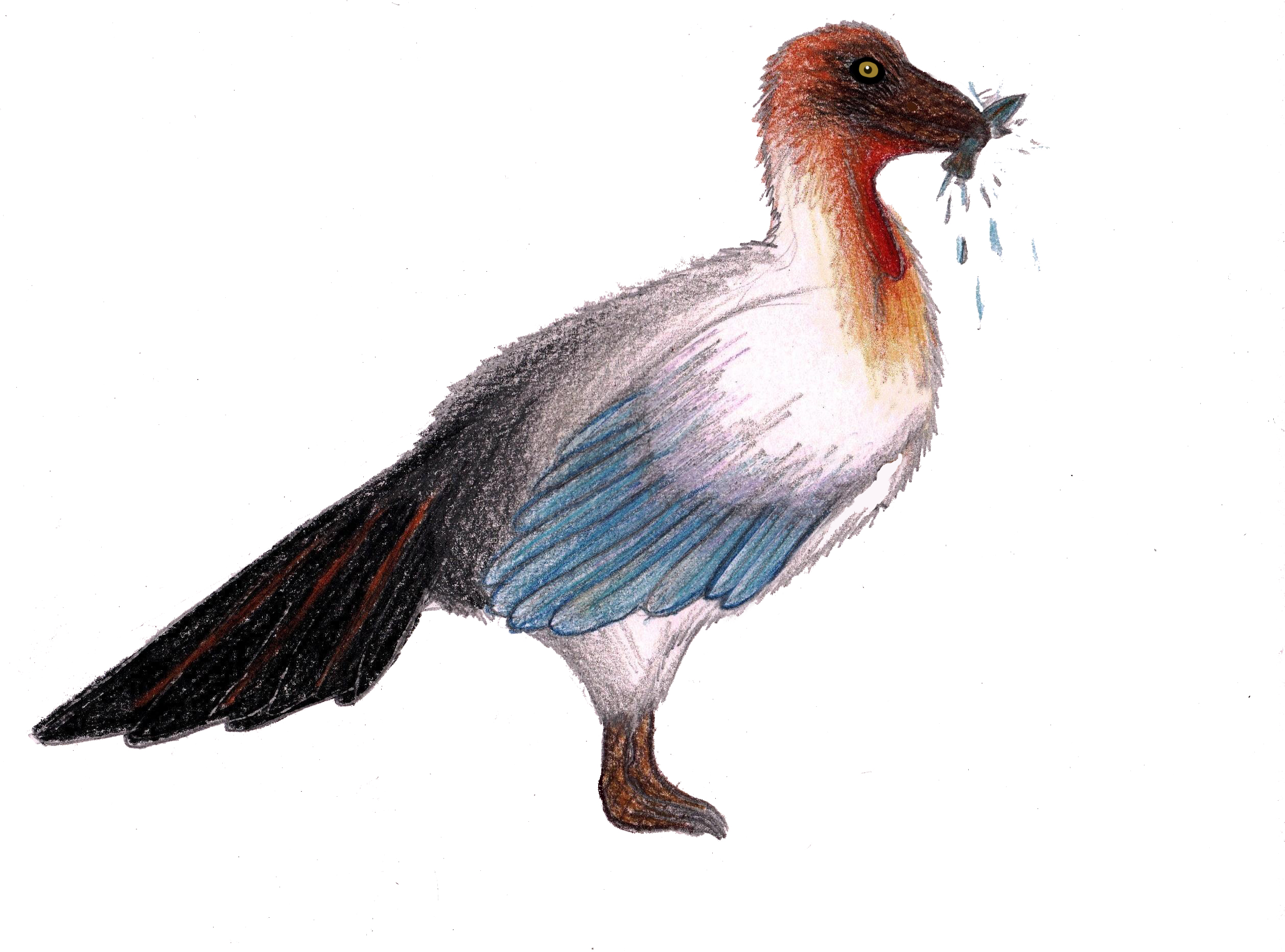
Speculative life restoration of the closely related Piscivoravis with a fish

In their phylogenetic analyses, Huang et al. (2026) recovered Kunpengornis as a member of the Euornithes, as the sister taxon to Piscivoravis. In turn, this clade was found to diverge after the Yanornithidae, but before the Gansuidae and Ornithuromorpha. These results are displayed in the cladogram below:

- Ornithothoraces
  - †Enantiornithes
  - Euornithes
    - †Zhongjianornis
    - - †Chongmingia
      - - - - †Xinghaiornis
            - †Xiangornis
          - - †Yumenornis
            - - †Eogranivora
              - †Dingavis
        - - †Archaeorhynchus
          - - - †Mengciusornis
              - †Schizooura
            - - †Tianyuornis
              - - †Archaeornithura
                - †Hongshanornithidae
                  - †Hongshanornis
                  - - †Parahongshanornis
                    - - †Changmaornis
                      - †Longicrusavis
                - - †Jianchangornis
                  - - †Yanornithidae
                      - - †Similiyanornis
                        - †Songlingornis
                      - - †Ambiortus
                        - - †Yanornis
                          - †Yixianornis
                    - - - †Kunpengornis
                        - †Piscivoravis
                      - - - †Khinganornis
                          - - †Shuilingornis
                            - - †Changzuiornis
                              - †Hollanda
                        - - †Gansuidae
                            - †Iteravis
                            - †Gansus yumenensis
                          - - Ornithuromorpha
