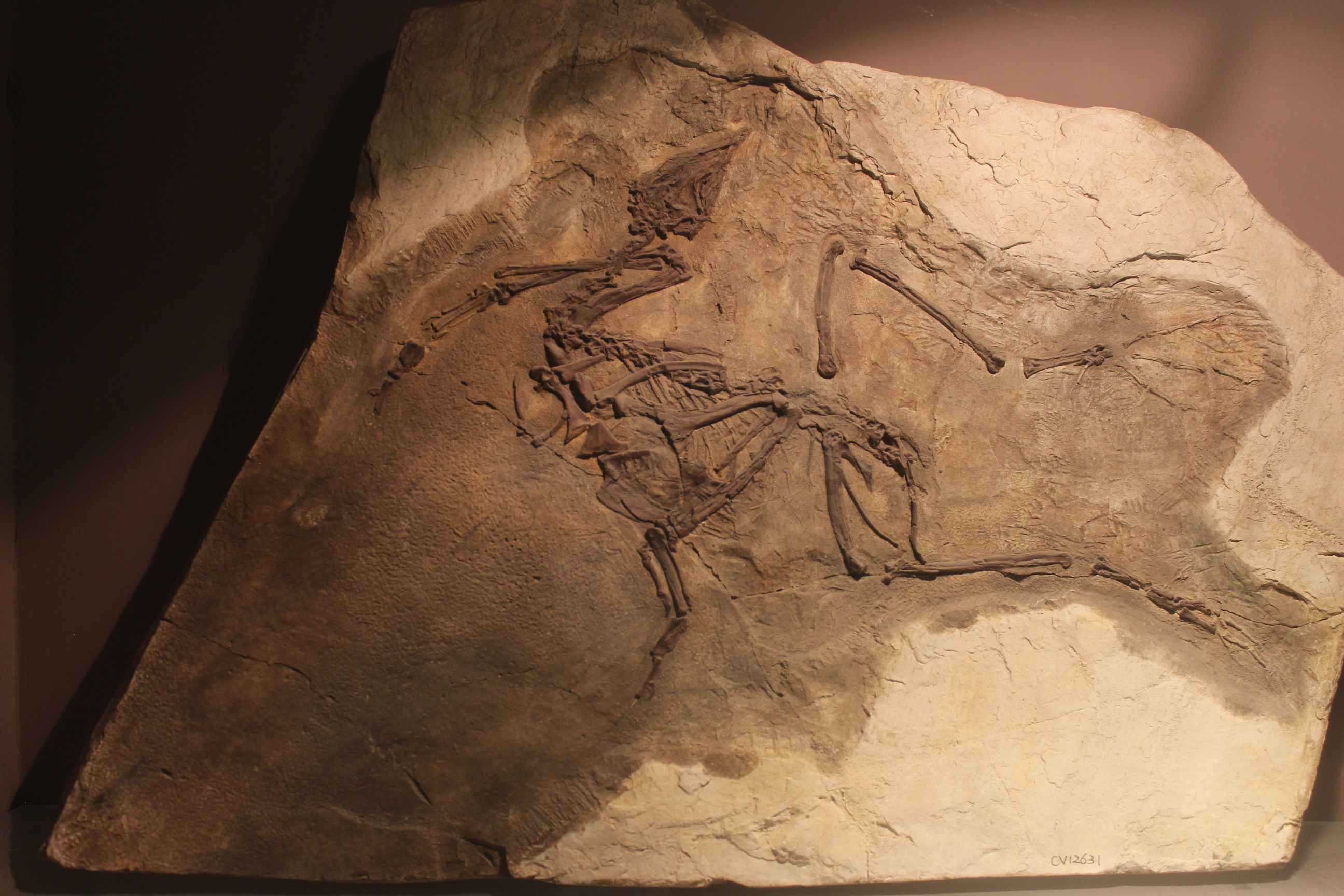
- Holotype of Yixianornis grabaui, Paleozoological Museum of China

Scientific classification
- Kingdom: Animalia
- Phylum: Chordata
- Class: Reptilia
- Clade: Dinosauria
- Clade: Saurischia
- Clade: Theropoda
- Clade: Avialae
- Clade: †Yanornithiformes
- Family: †Songlingornithidae; Hou, 1997

Type species
- †Songlingornis linghensis Hou, 1997

Genera
- †Piscivoravis?; †Songlingornis; †Yanornis?; †Yixianornis?

Synonyms
- Yanornithidae? Zhou & Zhang, 2001; Aberratiodontuidae? Gong, Hou & Wang, 2004; Yixianornithidae? Zhang & Zhou, 2006

= Songlingornithidae =

Songlingornithids Temporal range: Early Cretaceous, 125–120 Ma

Extinct family of dinosaurs

Songlingornithidae is a family of basal euornithean dinosaurs from the Early Cretaceous of China. All known specimens come from the Jiufotang Formation and the Yixian Formation, dating to the early Barremian and Aptian ages, 125–120 million years ago.

The family Songlingornithidae was first named by Hou in 1997 to contain the type genus, Songlingornis. Clarke et al. (2006) was the first to find a close relationship between Songlingornis and the "yanornithids".

The name was originally coined to reflect a close relationship between the two supposedly similar (but poorly preserved) genera Songlingornis and Chaoyangia. However, subsequent studies found that Chaoyangia was probably not closely related to Songlingornis. Instead, Songlingornis was found to be closely related to another group which had been given the name Yanornithidae—the name Songlingornithidae, having been named first, took precedence. Some later studies have also placed the hongshanornithids in this group. At least one study has found the Late Cretaceous Mongolian avialan Hollanda to be a member of the group as well.

== Phylogeny ==
Below is a cladogram from Mayr (2017) showing the relationships between Songlingornithidae and other ornithuromorphs:

- Ornithuromorpha
  - Archaeorhynchus
  - - Vorona
    - - Schizooura
      - - Hongshanornithidae
        - - Jianchangornis
          - - Songlingornithidae
              - Songlingornis
              - - Yixianornis
                - - Piscivoravis
                  - Yanornis
            - - Gansus
              - - Apsaravis
                - - Hesperornithes
                  - - Ichthyornis
                    - Neornithes (modern birds)

A 2020 study by Wang et al. failed to recover a monophyletic Songlingornithidae, instead finding Yanornis to form a clade with the newly described genera Abitusavis and Similiyanornis, for which the name Yanornithidae was used:

- Ornithuromorpha
  - Archaeorhynchus
  - - Jianchangornis
    - - - Bellulornis
        - Schizoouridae
      - - Hongshanornithidae
        - - Songlingornis
          - - Yanornithidae
              - Abitusavis
              - Similiyanornis
              - Yanornis
            - - Piscivoravis
              - - - Yixianornis
                  - - Apsaravis
                    - - Patagopteryx
                      - Vorona
                - - Iteravis
                  - - Gansus
                    - Ornithurae
