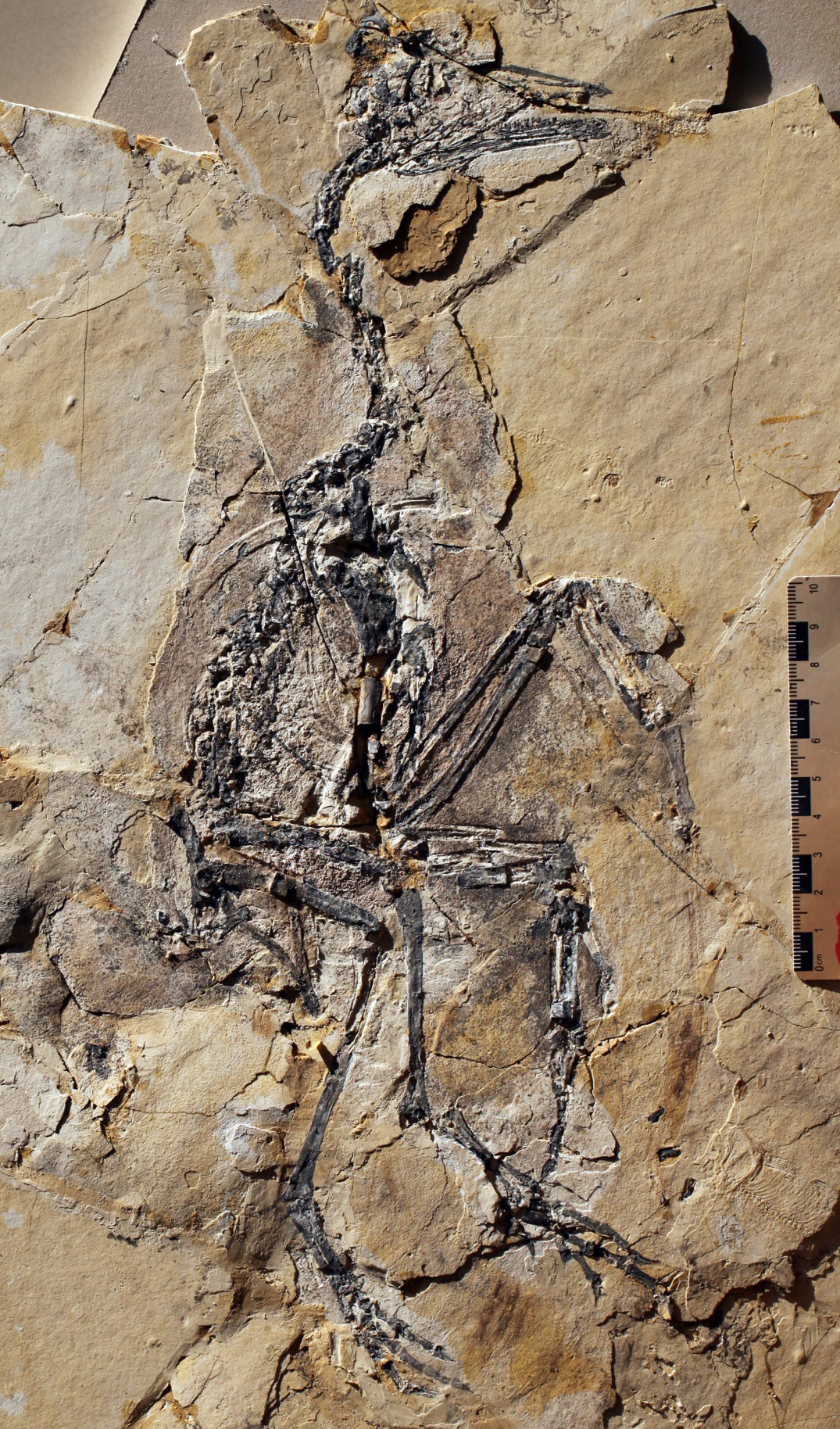
- Fossil specimen of Y. martini
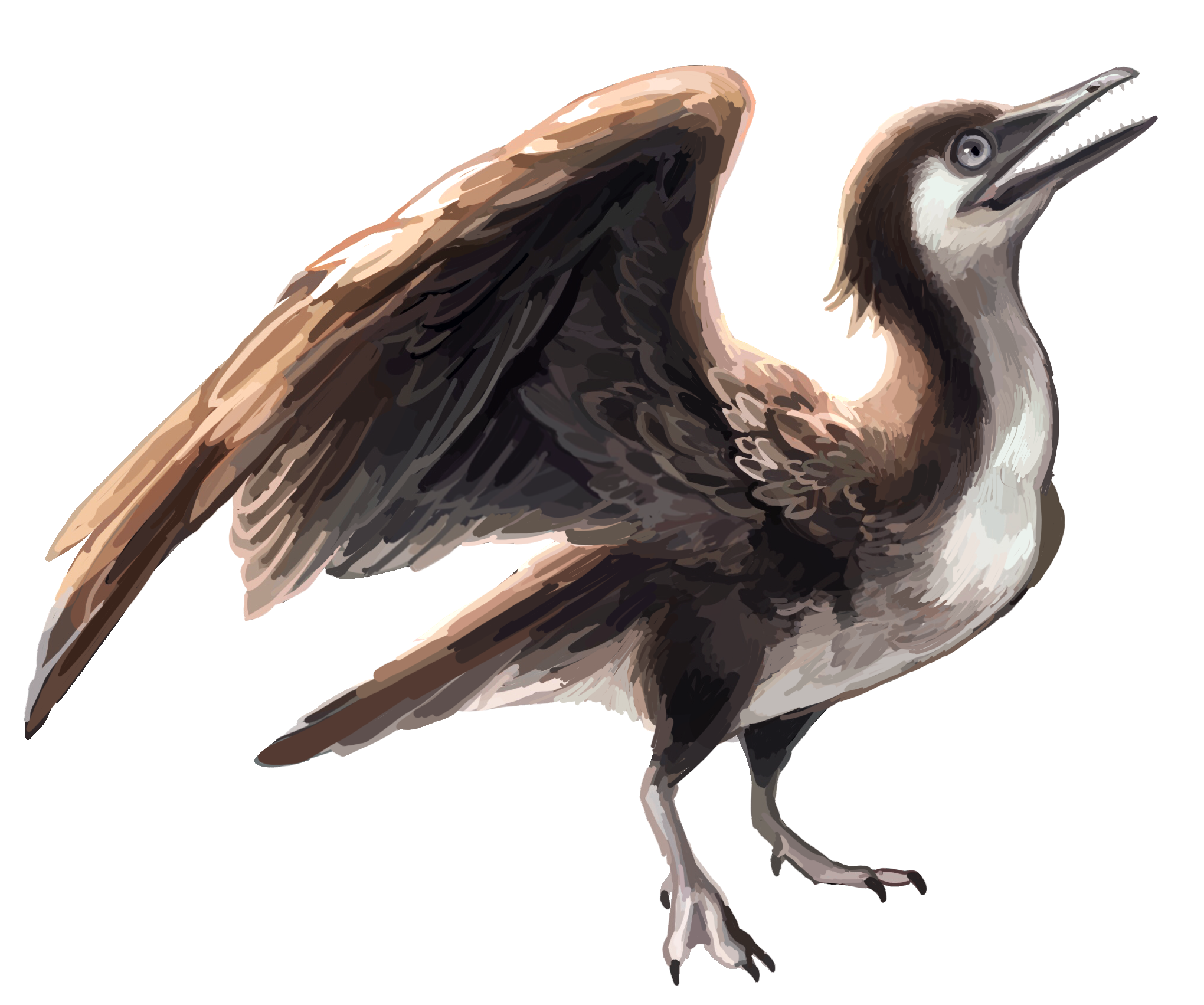
- Artist's reconstruction of Y. martini

Scientific classification
- Kingdom: Animalia
- Phylum: Chordata
- Class: Reptilia
- Clade: Dinosauria
- Clade: Saurischia
- Clade: Theropoda
- Clade: Avialae
- Family: †Songlingornithidae
- Genus: †Yanornis; Zhou & Zhang, 2001

Type species
- †Yanornis martini Zhou & Zhang, 2001

Species
- †Y. martini Zhou & Zhang, 2001; †Y. guozhangi Wang et al., 2013

Synonyms
- Archaeovolans repatriatus Czerkas & Xu, 2002; Aberratiodontus wui Gong, Hou & Wang, 2004

= Yanornis =

Yanornis Temporal range: Aptian, 125–120 Ma

Extinct genus of dinosaurs

Yanornis (simplified Chinese: 燕鸟; traditional Chinese: 燕鳥; pinyin: Yān niǎo; lit. 'Yan bird') is an extinct genus of fish-eating Early Cretaceous birds. Two species have been described, both from Liaoning province, China: Yanornis martini, based on several fossils found in the 120-million-year-old Jiufotang Formation at Chaoyang, and Yanornis guozhangi, from the 124-million-year-old Yixian Formation.

== Description ==
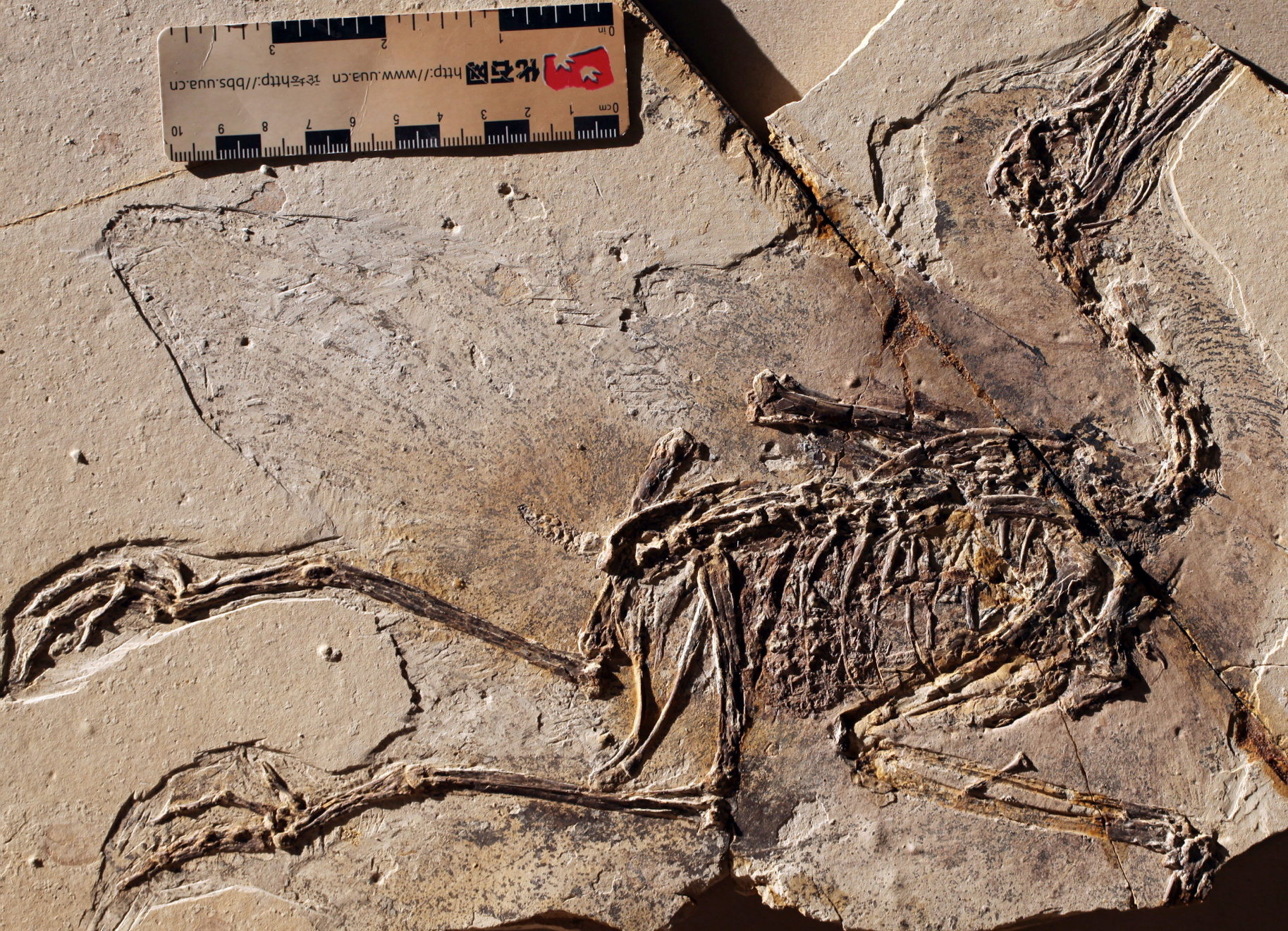
Fossil specimen of Y. martini

Y. martini was the size of a chicken, had a long skull with about 10 teeth in the upper jaw and 20 teeth in the lower jaw, and was both able to fly and walk well, having a well-developed U-shaped furcula (wishbone).

The absence of the prefrontal bone and the non-diapsid skull allows Yanornis to be classified as an ornithuromorph, a member of a group of stem-birds which also includes the common ancestor of living birds. Similarly, its scapula and coracoid had evolved the basic shape and layout as in modern birds, enabling Yanornis to lift its wings far above its back for an efficient upstroke. It was probably a more efficient flyer compared to Enantiornithes (which have the modern condition in a less well-developed form), and especially compared to Confuciusornis and Archaeopteryx, which were only marginally able to perform upstrokes. To allow for the necessarily large flight muscles, the sternum of Yanornis was longer than it was wide, again representing an essentially modern condition.

The feet of yanornis had long toes, with elongated phalanges and relatively strait unguals. The toe pads (soft fleshy sturctures present on the toes of tetrapods) on the 3rd toe are mesarthral (the separation between each pad corresponds to an articulation point) and are most similar to those of ground birds like chickens.

== Biology ==
As indicated by the morphology of its feet, Yanornis was not good at grasping branches and likely spend more time on the ground. This lifestyle is in accordance with its limb proportions as Yanornis was recovered as possibly arboreal or terrestrial.

=== Diet ===
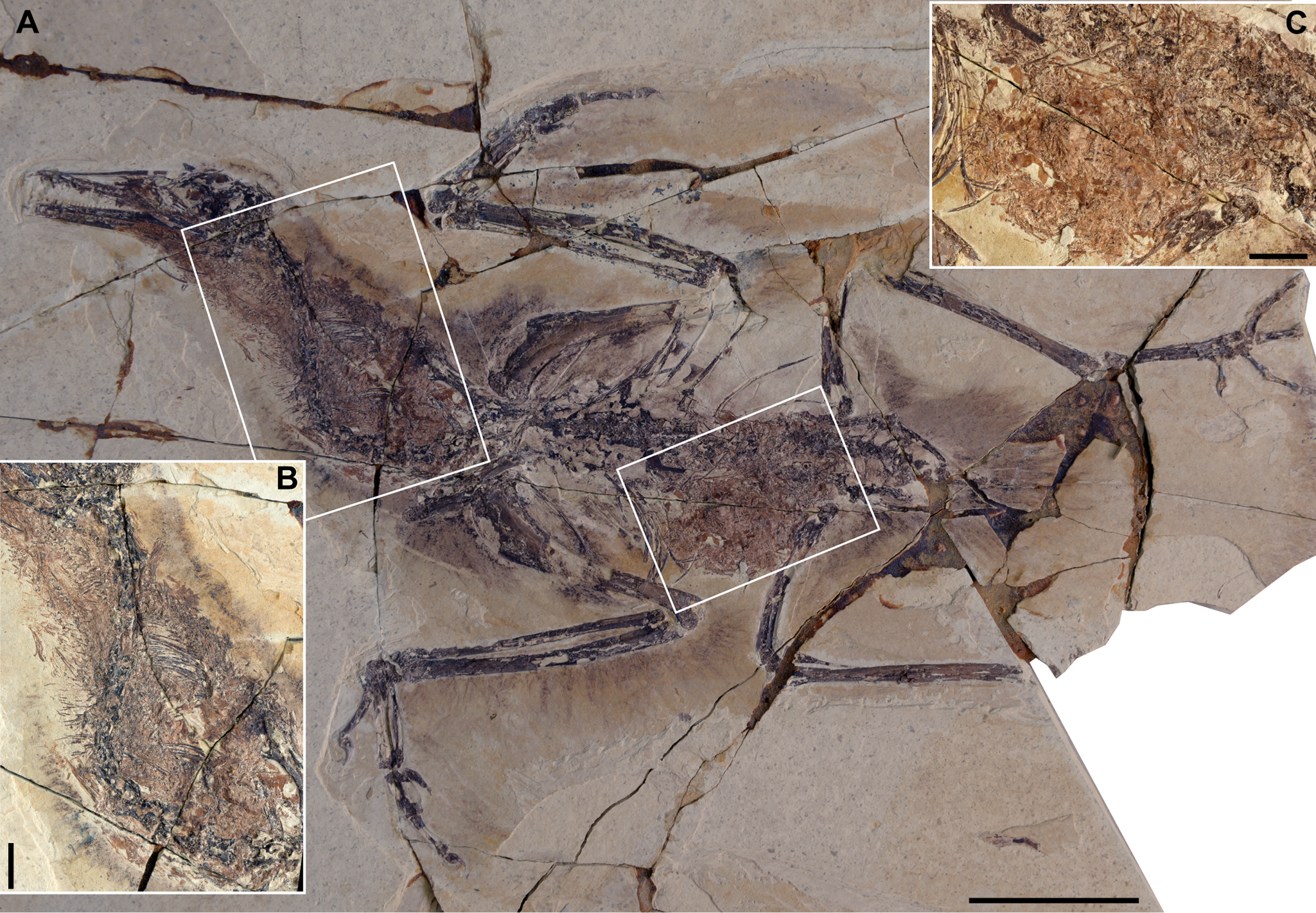
Specimen of Y. martini with a whole fish in its crop, and macerated fish remains in its stomach

Several fossil specimens of Y. martini preserve the remains of fish in the stomach and crop, suggesting that these birds were primarily fish-eaters. Their fish-eating and associated adaptations show convergent evolution with the unrelated enantiornithine Longipteryx.

One specimen preserved large amounts of supposed gastroliths ("stomach stones") in the gizzard region. Large numbers of small gastroliths are usually associated with species that need to grind tough plant material, such as seeds, after swallowing them. This led some scientists to suggest that Yanornis was capable of "diet switching", perhaps seasonally, between fish and seeds. However, later studies cast doubt on the diet-switching hypothesis. Further study of the specimen found that the supposed stomach stones were not massed around a single region corresponding with the gizzard, as in other fossils with such stones, including specimens of Archaeorhynchus and Hongshanornis. Rather, the stones were spread throughout the body cavity in a front-to-back arrangement. This has been suggested to correspond more closely with the intestines, and may represent impacted sand. In modern birds, sand is often swallowed accidentally during feeding (particularly when feeding on dead fish), and, due to some obstruction, may eventually become impacted in the intestines, leading to death.

== Classification ==
In a 2006 study of early bird relationships, it was found that Yanornis, Yixianornis, and Songlingornis formed a monophyletic group; since Songlingornis was the first of these birds to be described, the family containing this group is Songlingornithidae. The order Yanornithiformes has been erected to mark their distinctness from other early Ornithurae such as Gansus, but might be called Songlingornithiformes; especially if the present taxon is indeed a junior synonym of Songlingornis as sometimes proposed.

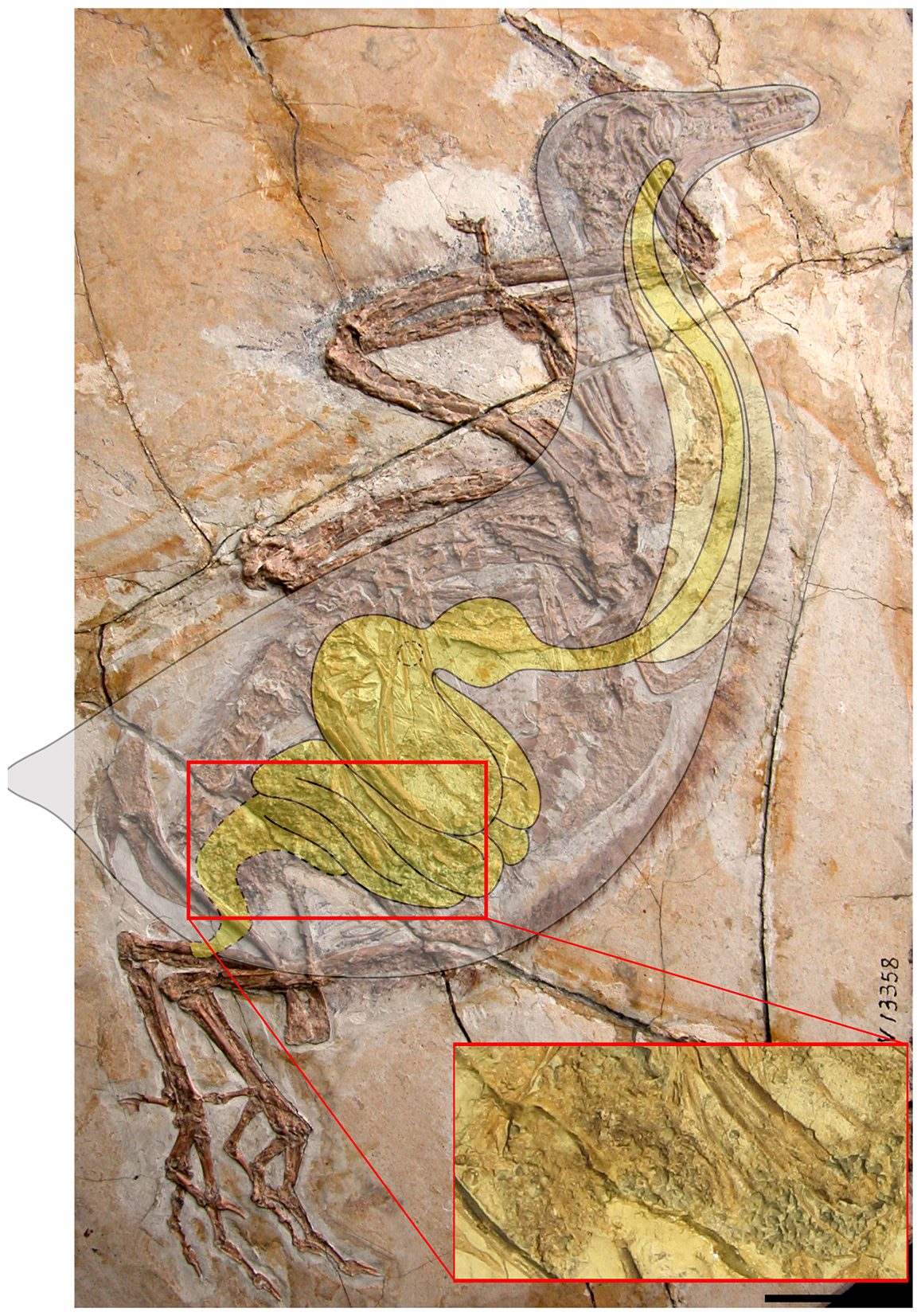
Reconstructed alimentary canal superimposed over a specimen of Y. martini

The cladogram below follows O'Connor et al., 2013 phylogenetic analysis. The clade names are positioned based on their definitions (contra O'Connor et al. (2013)).

- Euornithes
  - - Archaeorhynchus spathula
    - Jianchangornis microdonta
  - Ornithuromorpha
    - Chaoyangia beishanensis
    - Schizooura lii
    - Vorona berivotrensis
    - Zhongjianornis yangi
    - - Patagopteryx deferrariisi
      - - Hongshanornithidae
          - Hongshanornis longicresta
          - Longicrusavis houi
        - - Songlingornithidae
            - Yixianornis grabaui
            - - Hollanda luceria
              - Songlingornis linghensis
              - Yanornis martini
          - - Gansus yumenensis
            - - Ambiortiformes
                - Ambiortus dementjevi
                - Apsaravis ukhaana
              - Ornithurae

=== Name and synonyms ===
The genus name Yanornis is derived from the name of an Ancient China area—Yan feudal fiefdom, and Ancient Greek ornis—"bird". The species Y. martini was named for avian paleontologist Larry Martin.

Yanornis gained notoriety when the front half of a fossil bird was combined with the tail of a Microraptor to make the paleontological forgery "Archaeoraptor". Upon discovering this, the bird half was described as Archaeovolans repatriatus, which was later found to be a junior synonym of Yanornis.

Some studies have found that the bird species Aberratiodontus wui is in fact a poorly preserved specimen of Yanornis martini, or at least a close relative, an opinion which has been supported by subsequent reviews of enantiornithine taxonomy.
