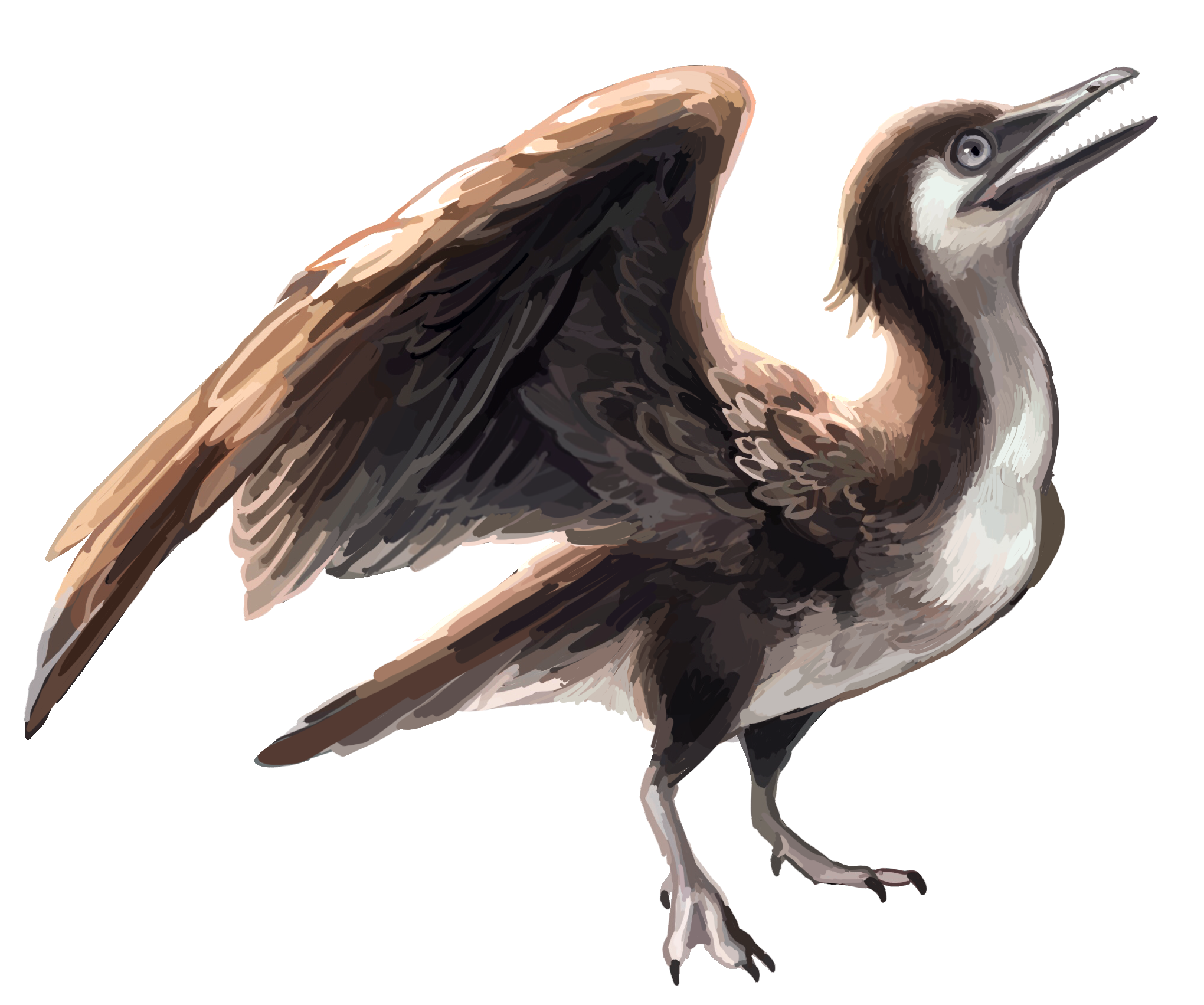
- Artist's reconstruction of Yanornis martini

Scientific classification
- Kingdom: Animalia
- Phylum: Chordata
- Class: Reptilia
- Clade: Dinosauria
- Clade: Saurischia
- Clade: Theropoda
- Clade: Avialae
- Clade: Ornithuromorpha
- Clade: †Yanornithiformes; Zhou & Zhang, 2001

Families
- †Hongshanornithidae?; †Songlingornithidae

Synonyms
- Aberratiodontuiformes Gong et al., 2004

= Yanornithiformes =

Yanornithiformes Temporal range: Early Cretaceous, 120 Ma

Extinct order of dinosaurs

Yanornithiformes is an order of ornithuromorph dinosaurs from the early Cretaceous Period of China. All known specimens come from the Yixian Formation and Jiufotang Formation, dating to the early Aptian age, 124.6 to 120 million years ago.

== Naming and early studies ==
The family Songlingornithidae was first named by Hou in 1997 to contain the type genus, Songlingornis. Clarke et al. (2006) was first to find a close relationship between Songlingornis and the "yanornithids", which had been previously named to contain the similar species Yanornis and Yixianornis. At least one study has found Hollanda from the Late Cretaceous of Mongolia to be a member of this group. The family Yanornithidae (now Songlingornithidae) had been placed in its own order containing no other families, named Yanornithiformes, in 2001.

== Disputed relationship with the hongshanornithids ==
Beginning in 2012, multiple studies began to recover the songlingornithids in a clade with the hongshanornithids, a group of smaller, more specialized ornithuromorphs from the same time and place as some of the songlingornithids. Other studies however continued to place the hongshanornithids just outside the yanornithiform clade.
