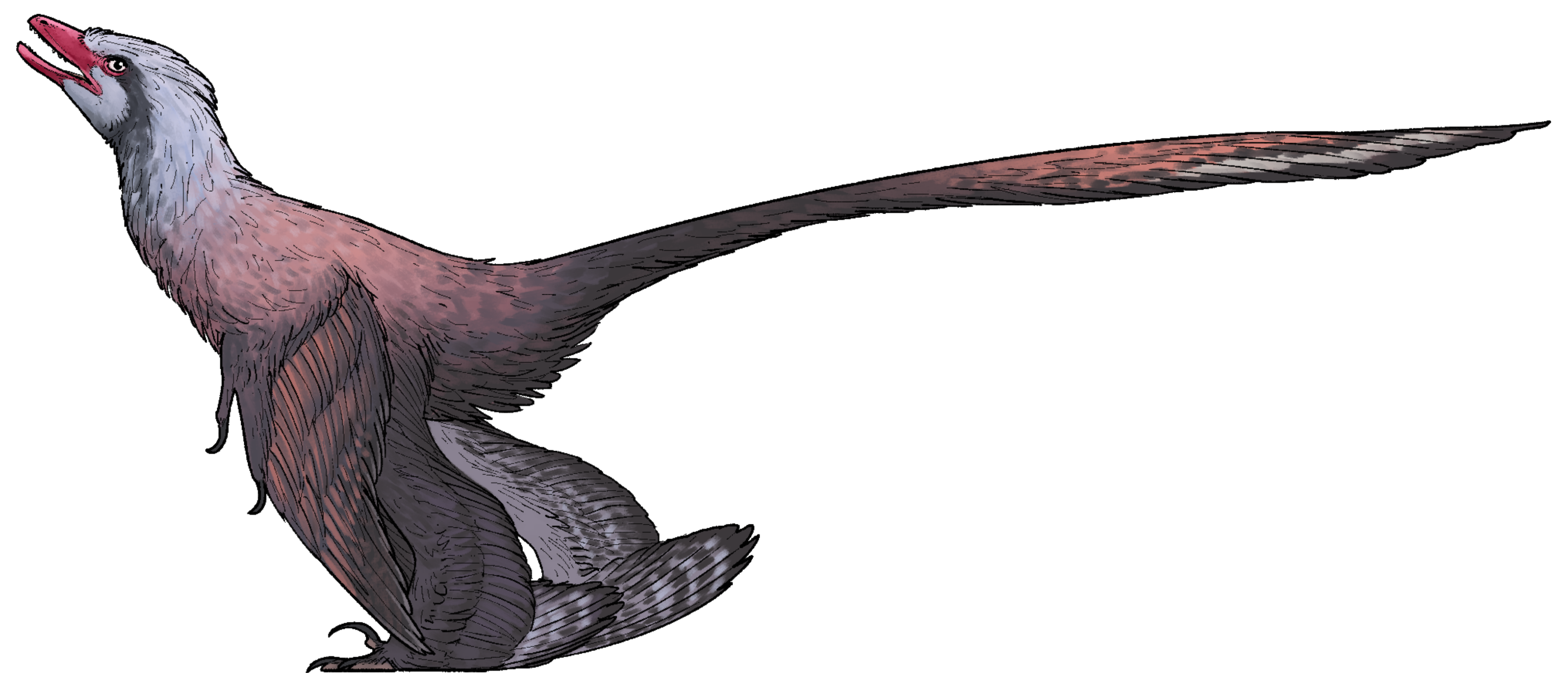
- Life restoration

Scientific classification
- Kingdom: Animalia
- Phylum: Chordata
- Class: Reptilia
- Clade: Dinosauria
- Clade: Saurischia
- Clade: Theropoda
- Clade: Paraves
- Genus: †Changzhousaurus; Xu, 2026
- Species: †C. sinensis

Binomial name
- †Changzhousaurus sinensis Xu et al., 2026

= Changzhousaurus =

Changzhousaurus Temporal range: Early Cretaceous, Aptian

Genus of theropod dinosaur

Changzhousaurus (lit. 'Changzhou lizard') is an extinct genus of paravian theropod dinosaur known from the Early Cretaceous (Aptian age) Jiufotang Formation of China. The genus contains a single species, Changzhousaurus sinensis, known from a nearly complete, articulated skeleton with extensive associated feather traces, preserved as a part and counterpart.

Changzhousaurus is a very small dinosaur, with a body length of 34 centimetres (13 in). It has large wings on its forelimbs, paired with shorter hindlimb wings. It also has a fan of long, plume-like feathers at the end of its tail. The exact relationships of Changzhousaurus with other pennaraptoran theropods are unclear, given the conflicting anatomical characters of different groups, including troodontids, dromaeosaurids, anchiornithids, and avialans.

== Discovery and naming ==
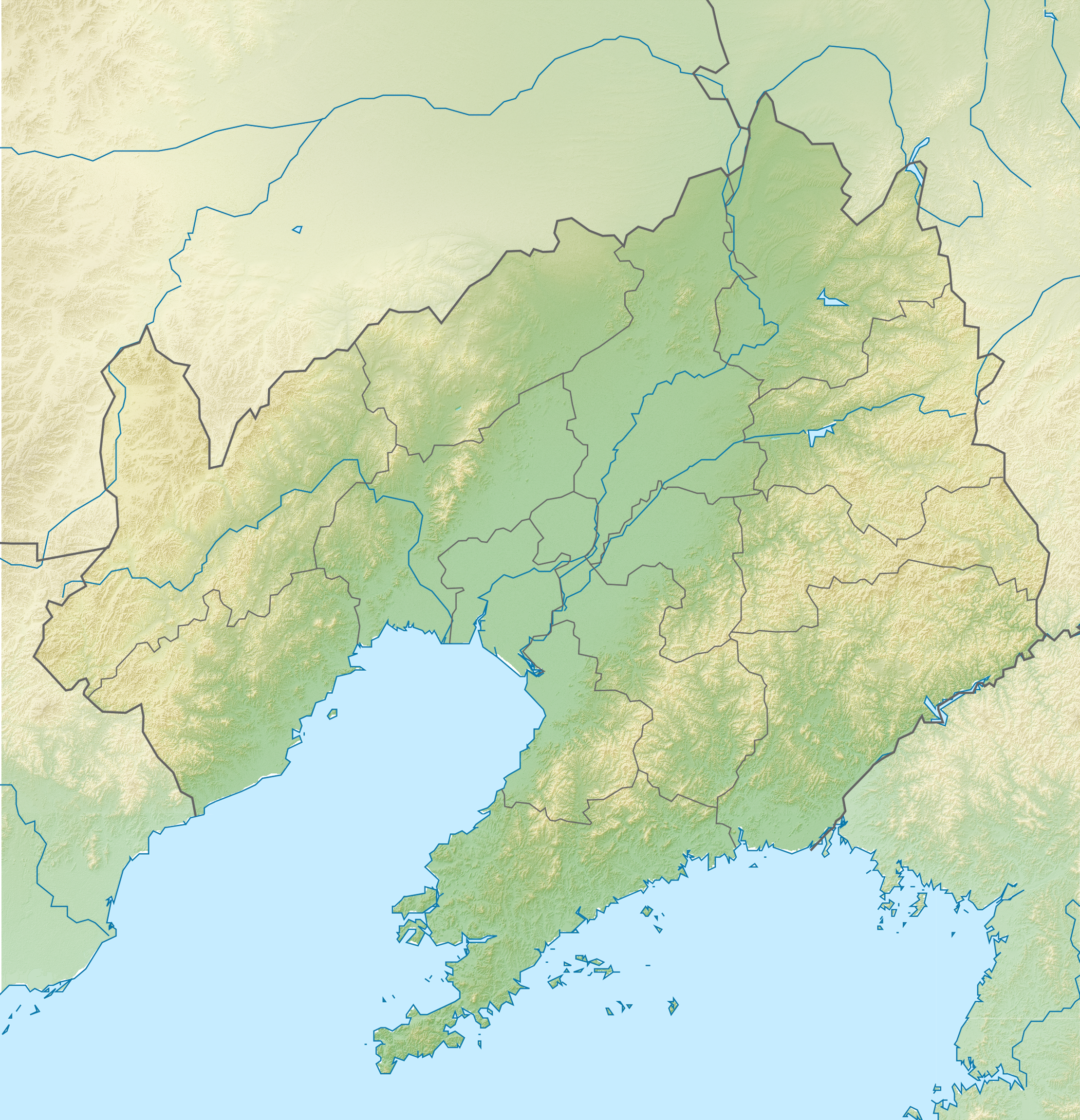
Type locality of C. sinensis in Liaoning Province, China

The Changzhousaurus fossil material was discovered in outcrops of the Jiufotang Formation in Lamadong of Jianchang County in western Liaoning Province, China. The specimen, which is preserved on two opposing slabs of rock as a part and counterpart, was prepared by Ding Xiaoqin. It is now housed in the Lande Museum of Natural History, where it is permanently accessioned as LDNHMF 2026A and 2026B. Casts of both pieces are housed in the Institute of Vertebrate Paleontology and Paleoanthropology as IVPP FV2204A and 2204B. This fossil preserves a nearly complete, articulated skeleton surrounded by traces of extensive plumage.

In 2026, Xu Xing described Changzhousaurus sinensis as a new genus and species of pennaraptoran dinosaur based on these fossil remains, establishing LDNHMF 2026A, 2026B as the holotype specimen. The generic name, Changzhousaurus, combines a reference to Changzhou city of Jiangsu Province, China, with the Ancient Greek σαῦρος (sauros), meaning 'lizard'. This name was chosen in gratitude to the Changzhou Municipal Government and its support for dinosaur paleontology and science promotion. The specific name, sinensis, is derived from the Latin word Sinae (in turn from the Greek Σῖναι (Sînai)), meaning Chinese, alluding to the holotype's country of origin.

== Description ==
Size compared to a human hand

The holotype of C. sinensis has a body length of 34 centimetres (13 in), making it one of the smallest non-avialan theropod dinosaurs known. The fusion of the sacral vertebrae suggests this individual was not a juvenile, though the lack of fusion between the metatarsals and distal tarsals (those furthest from the body) suggests it was not yet fully mature when it died.

The skull is proportionately small and deep, with a short snout and likely a large external naris. The premaxillae have four unserrated teeth, the second of which is the largest. These are followed by around fifteen teeth in the maxilla, all of which also lack serrations. The dentary (tooth-bearing bone in the mandible) is slender and elongate, with a row of foramina along its length. It likely bore around 20 teeth, with those at the front more slender and close together compared to the more robust, widely spaced ones at the rear of the jaw. The front dentary teeth are also slightly curved, without serrations, while the rear ones are more strongly curved, with serrations along the posterior (rear) edges.

Nine cervical (neck) vertebrae were identified in the C. sinensis holotype, though ten were likely present. It also has 13 dorsal (trunk) vertebrae, likely six sacral vertebrae, and 22 caudal (tail) vertebrae. This indicates a short tail compared to other pennaraptorans, most similar to the count seen in scansoriopterygids, some basal oviraptorosaurs, and most avialans. The scapula is short and likely mobile in relation to the coracoid. The forelimb is proportionately long, similar to Xiaotingia, about 60% the length of the hindlimb. The manual unguals (hand claws) are strongly curved. The claw on the second digit is the largest, followed by the third and fourth digits (Xu sees the three tetanuran manual digits as II-III-IV, whereas others consider them to be I-II-III) . The claw on digit IV is notably large, though, compared to other basal maniraptorans. The ilium is small, a feature common in dromaeosaurids of the Jehol biota and other basal paravians, while the pubis is long. The femur (upper leg bone) is bowed anteriorly (toward the front), and shorter than the tibia (shin bone). The digits of the hind foot are short compared to many basal paravians, being more similar to proportions of dromaeosaurids and troodontids. The second digit bears the enlarged claw typical of those clades. Keratin sheath impressions are preserved around both the hand and foot ungual of the holotype. These increase the curvature and length of the claws substantially. The enlarged pedal ungual II is 7.5 millimetres (0.30 in) long, with the sheath adding an additional 4.5 mm (0.18 in).

=== Plumage ===
Extensive feather traces surround the entire skeleton of the holotype. The style of preservation of this specimen makes it challenging to distinguish the details of individual feathers, but many different sizes and morphologies are visible. On the body, the feathers range from 10–35 mm (0.39–1.38 in) over the head and neck. From the base of the tail to its center, the feathers are 20–30 mm (0.79–1.18 in) long. About 16 long feathers are visible at the tip of the tail, comparable to those seen in many early-diverging avialans and some scansoriopterygids. In some ways, these plume-like feathers are similar to the fan-like train feathers of peacocks.

Wings formed by large, curved pennaceous feathers are present on both the forelimbs and hindlimbs. With a length of around 12 cm (4.7 in), the longest primary feathers on the forelimb are proportionately longer than in any other known non-avialan pennaraptoran. The hindlimb feathers range from 25–35 mm (0.98–1.38 in) long on the femur and tibia, to 60 mm (2.4 in) on the metatarsals. The distal arrangement of the longest hindlimb feathers is more similar to microraptorines than anchiornithids.

== Classification ==
Two major groups are widely recognized within the theropod clade Pennaraptora: the sister groups Oviraptorosauria and Paraves. The latter contains Dromaeosauridae, Troodontidae, and Avialae (which includes modern birds). Additional smaller clades (Unenlagiinae, Microraptorinae, Scansoriopterygidae, Anchiornithidae, and Halszkaraptorinae) are also recognized, and may belong to the aforementioned larger groups, but their exact affinities are not as confidently established. Some researchers group dromaeosaurids and troodontids into a single monophyletic clade, the Deinonychosauria, but this is not supported by all analyses. In his 2026 description of Changzhousaurus, Xu did not perform a phylogenetic analysis to test its relationships to other theropods. A mosaic of conflicting traits was noted in the holotype, making such analyses difficult without a sufficiently robust dataset.

Many anatomical characters support a placement of Changzhousaurus as a pennaraptoran theropod, including an elongate external naris, shortened first caudal vertebra, L-shaped scapulocoracoid, and a long, lobate preacetabular process of the ilium. Various features, including the skull's short and subtriangular shape, the fused sacral zygapophyses, and the short, strap-like ischium, indicate Changzhousaurus is a paravian. Other derived traits are seen in both troodontids and dromaeosaurids, but not in other pennaraptorans. Some features of the maxilla and foot are more consistent with troodontids such as Mei long, while other features of the dentary, coracoid, and ilium are more aligned with dromaeosaurids. Xu (2026) used this unique combination of traits to support the monophyly of Deinonychosauria, within which he preferred an early-diverging placement for Changzhousaurus. Confusingly, he noted that some features of the cervical and caudal vertebrae exhibit the derived conditions seen in troodontids, anchiornithids (especially Xiaotingia), and Archaeopteryx. Other features of the metacarpal are also seen in halszkaraptorines and enantiornitheans, while some of the carpal characters are reminiscent of avialans but not other pennaraptorans.
