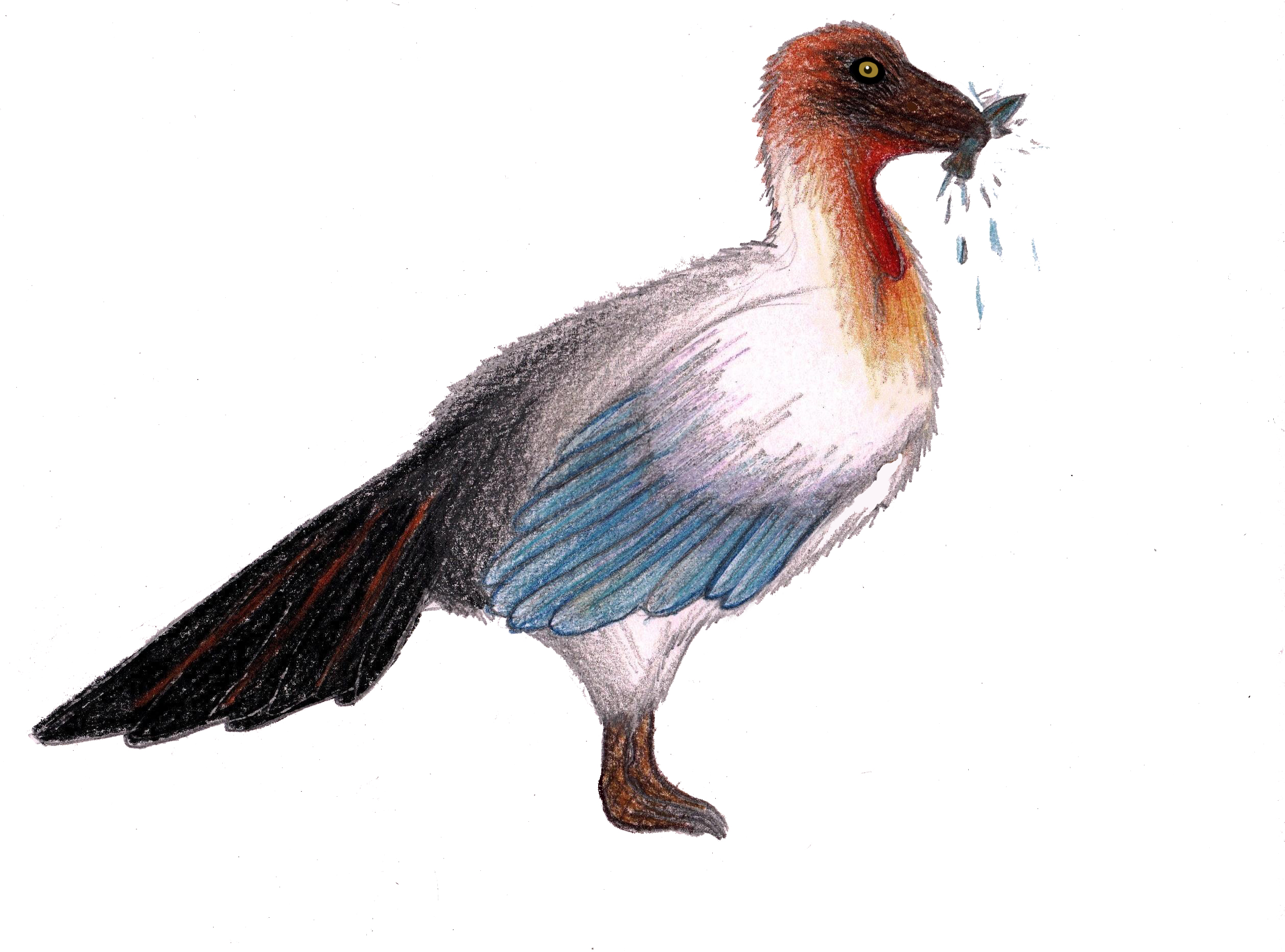
- Life restoration

Scientific classification
- Kingdom: Animalia
- Phylum: Chordata
- Class: Reptilia
- Clade: Dinosauria
- Clade: Saurischia
- Clade: Theropoda
- Clade: Avialae
- Family: †Songlingornithidae
- Genus: †Piscivoravis; Zhou et al., 2013
- Species: †P. lii

Binomial name
- †Piscivoravis lii Zhou et al., 2013

= Piscivoravis =

Piscivoravis Temporal range: Early Cretaceous, 120 Ma

Extinct genus of dinosaurs

Piscivoravis is an extinct genus of fish-eating ornithuromorph dinosaurs known from the Early Cretaceous Jiufotang Formation (Aptian age) of western Liaoning Province, northeastern China. Piscivoravis was first named by Shuang Zhou, Zhonghe Zhou and Jingmai O'Connor in 2013 and the type species is Piscivoravis lii. Phylogenetic analysis places Piscivoravis in a more derived position than Archaeorhynchus, in a polytomy with Jianchangornis, Patagopteryx, and the clade including all more derived ornithuromorphs.
