= Chaoyangia =

Chaoyangia Temporal range: Early Cretaceous, 120 Ma

Scientific classification
- Kingdom: Animalia
- Phylum: Chordata
- Clade: Euornithes
- Order: †Chaoyangiformes; Hou, 1997
- Genus: †Chaoyangia; Hou & Zhang, 1993
- Species: †C. beishanensis

Binomial name
- †Chaoyangia beishanensis Hou & Zhang, 1993

Extinct genus of dinosaurs

Chaoyangia is an extinct genus of euornithean birds, containing the single species Chaoyangia beishanensis. This species is known from a single fossil specimen consisting of a partial skeleton including vertebra, ribs, hips, and upper legs. The specimen (museum catalog number IVPP V9934) was discovered in the Jiufotang Formation near the city of Chaoyang in Liaoning province, China. This rock formation has been dated to the Aptian age of the Early Cretaceous period, 120 million years ago.

== Description ==
C. beishanensis, known only from a single partial skeleton, is relatively poorly known compared to other primitive euornitheans. Chaoyangia were small, basal euornithean birds characterized by more than eight fused sacral vertebrae (those connected to the hips), uniquely long, slender, and angled uncinate processes on the ribs, and a distinct 'neck' in the upper leg bone (femur). Overall, the known skeleton is very similar to another primitive Chinese euornithean bird, Zhongjianornis, which is known from a much more complete skeleton.

== History and classification ==
C. beishanensis was among the first fossil bird species found in the Jehol biota of China. At the time of its discovery, it was seen as being quite distinct from all other known birds at the time. When additional specimens were found and referred to the species in 1997, it was regarded as a member of the Ornithurae (=Euornithes), the lineage including modern birds but not enantiornitheans. Hou, who recognized the species as a euornithean, also placed it in its own order, Chaoyangiformes.

The additional fossil specimens referred to Chaoyangia, one a partial skeleton including partial wing bones and a partial skull, and the other an isolated foot, did not contain any bones in common with the original specimen, and so it was impossible to determine whether or not they actually belonged to the same genus. The more complete specimen including the partial skull was later classified in its own genus, Songlingornis. The removal of this specimen from Chaoyangia left its identity uncertain, and some researchers continued to suspect Songlingornis and Chaoyangia were synonyms.

In 2012, paleontologists Jingmai O'Connor and Zhou Zhong re-described the original Chaoyangia specimen, and confirmed that it was indeed a primitive euornithean (=ornithuran) using a phylogenetic analysis. Their study also supported the distinction between Chaoyangia and Songlingornis, with the latter bird more closely related to Yanornis as found by previous studies.
