= Gracilornis =

Gracilornis Temporal range: Early Cretaceous, 110 Ma

Scientific classification
- Domain: Eukaryota
- Kingdom: Animalia
- Phylum: Chordata
- Clade: Dinosauria
- Clade: Saurischia
- Clade: Theropoda
- Clade: Avialae
- Clade: †Enantiornithes
- Clade: †Euenantiornithes
- Genus: †Gracilornis; Li & Hou S. L., 2011

Species
- †Gracilornis jiufotangensis Li & Hou S. L., 2011 (type)

Extinct genus of birds

Gracilornis is an extinct genus of early bird from the lower Cretaceous (Aptian stage). It is a cathayornithid enantiornithine which lived in what is now western Liaoning Province, China. It is known from a nearly complete skull and postcranial skeleton, which was found from the Jiufotang Formation, in Chaoyang. It was first named by Li Li and Hou Shilin in 2011 and the type species is Gracilornis jiufotangensis. The generic name is derived from Latin gracilis, "slender" and Greek ornis, "bird", and refers to its slender skeleton. The specific name was named after the Jiufotang Formation, in which the holotype was collected.
