= Abitusavis =

Abitusavis Temporal range: Early Cretaceous, Aptian

Scientific classification
- Kingdom: Animalia
- Phylum: Chordata
- Class: Reptilia
- Clade: Dinosauria
- Clade: Saurischia
- Clade: Theropoda
- Clade: Avialae
- Clade: Ornithuromorpha
- Family: †Yanornithidae
- Genus: †Abitusavis; Wang et al., 2020
- Species: †A. lii

Binomial name
- †Abitusavis lii Wang et al., 2020

Extinct genus of dinosaurs

Abitusavis (meaning "departure bird") is an extinct genus of ornithuromorph dinosaurs from the Early Cretaceous Yixian Formation of China. The genus contains a single species, Abitusavis lii, known from a nearly complete skeleton.
