= Similiyanornis =

Similiyanornis Temporal range: Early Cretaceous, Aptian

Scientific classification
- Kingdom: Animalia
- Phylum: Chordata
- Class: Reptilia
- Clade: Dinosauria
- Clade: Saurischia
- Clade: Theropoda
- Clade: Avialae
- Clade: Ornithuromorpha
- Family: †Yanornithidae
- Genus: †Similiyanornis; Wang et al., 2020
- Species: †S. brevipectus

Binomial name
- †Similiyanornis brevipectus Wang et al., 2020

Extinct genus of dinosaurs

Similiyanornis (meaning "similar to Yanornis") is an extinct genus of ornithuromorph dinosaurs from the Early Cretaceous Jiufotang Formation of China. The genus contains a single species, Similiyanornis brevipectus, known from a complete skeleton with feathers.
