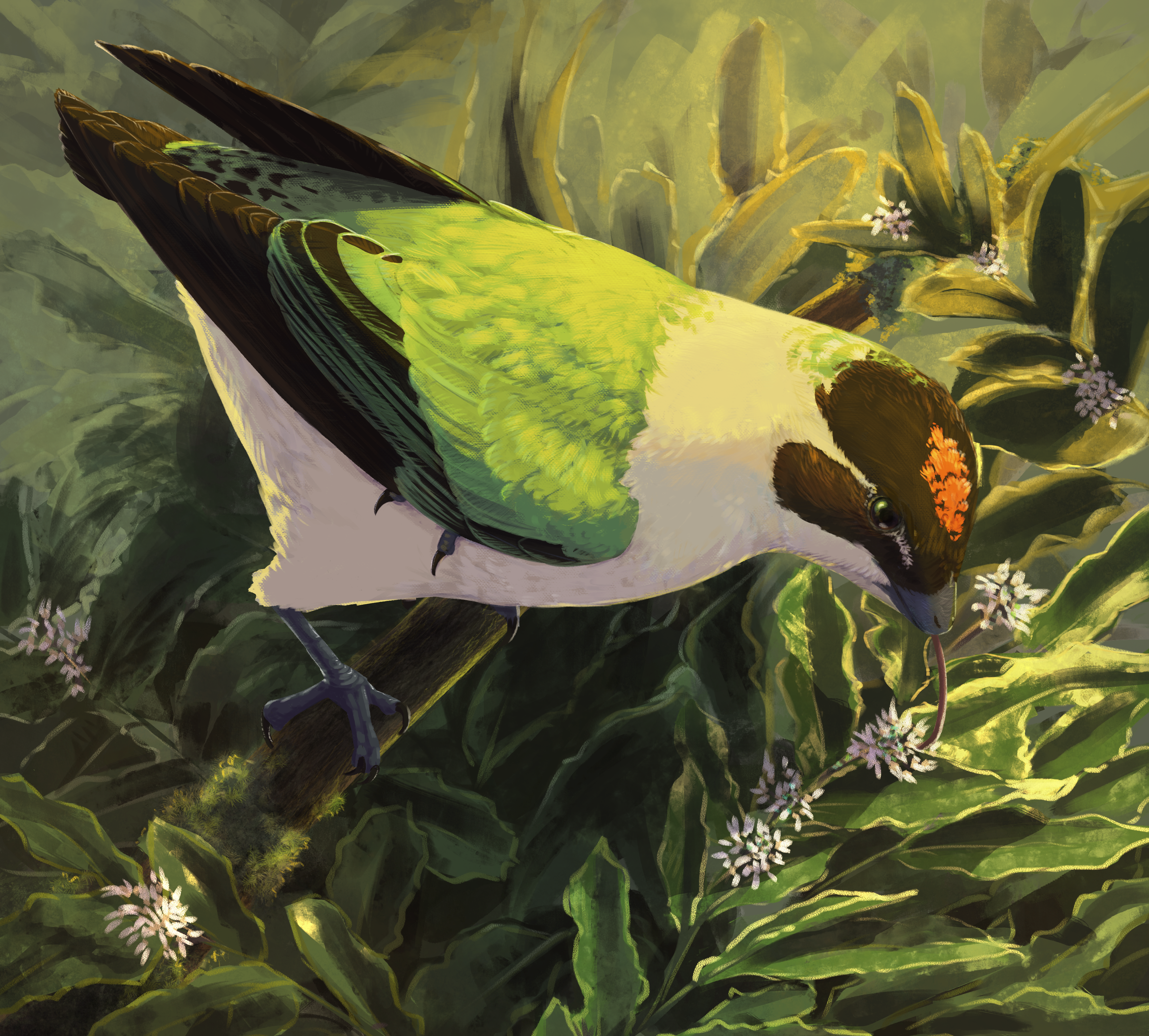
- Brevirostruavis macrohyoideus foraging on insects clustered around early flowers.

Scientific classification
- Kingdom: Animalia
- Phylum: Chordata
- Class: Reptilia
- Clade: Dinosauria
- Clade: Saurischia
- Clade: Theropoda
- Clade: Avialae
- Clade: †Enantiornithes
- Genus: †Brevirostruavis; Li et al., 2021
- Species: †B. macrohyoideus

Binomial name
- †Brevirostruavis macrohyoideus Li et al., 2021

= Brevirostruavis =

Brevirostruavis macrohyoideus Temporal range: Early Cretaceous, 120–113 Ma

Extinct genus of birds

Brevirostruavis (meaning "short rostrum bird") is a genus of Early Cretaceous enantiornithine bird from the Early Cretaceous Jiufotang Formation of Liaoning, China. The type and only species is Brevirostruavis macrohyoideus.

== Description ==
The holotype of the Brevirostruavis, IVPP V13266, preserves features of the skeletal anatomy not seen among early stem and extant birds. Such features include extremely lengthy and bony ceratobranchial hyoid elements, and a very short cranial rostrum. The combination of a long tongue and short beak is not seen in extant birds. This may indicate a feeding specialization similar to hummingbirds and other living birds with craniofacial similarities, such as honeyeaters and woodpeckers, although with these groups the epibranchials are lengthened.

== Paleoecology ==
Brevirostruavis comes from Early Cretaceous Jiufotang Formation, Which has the biggest and most important collection of Mesozoic birds. Other animals in the formation contains include the choristodere reptile Liaoxisaurus, the fish Lycoptera, the early mammal-like Fossiomanus, and the dinosaur Sinotyrannus.
