= Imparavis =

Imparavis Temporal range: Early Cretaceous (Aptian), 120 Ma

Scientific classification
- Kingdom: Animalia
- Phylum: Chordata
- Class: Reptilia
- Clade: Dinosauria
- Clade: Saurischia
- Clade: Theropoda
- Clade: Avialae
- Clade: †Enantiornithes
- Genus: †Imparavis
- Species: †I. attenboroughi

Binomial name
- †Imparavis attenboroughi Wang et al., 2024

Genus of enantiornithean birds

Imparavis (meaning "odd bird") is an extinct genus of enantiornithean birds from the Early Cretaceous (Aptian-aged) Jiufotang Formation of Liaoning Province, China. The genus contains a single species, I. attenboroughi, known from a well-preserved skeleton.

== Discovery and naming ==
Imparavis type locality in Jianchang County, Liaoning, China

The Imparavis holotype specimen, STM11-176, was discovered in sediments of the Jiufotang Formation near Toudaoyingzi village in Jianchang County, Liaoning Province, China. The holotype is preserved on a single slab, consisting of an articulated, nearly complete specimen, preserved in ventral view. It is missing part of the vertebral column and most of the gastralia. Faint feather traces are visible around parts of the skeleton.

In 2024, Wang et al. described Imparavis attenboroughi as a new genus and species of enantiornithean bird based on these fossil remains. The generic name, "Imparavis", combines the Latin words "impar", meaning "odd", and "avis", meaning "bird". The specific name, "attenboroughi", honors David Attenborough and his work with natural history presentation and wildlife preservation.

== Classification ==
In their phylogenetic analyses, Wang et al. (2024) recovered Imparavis as a member of the Enantiornithes, as the sister taxon to Yuornis in a clade of edentulous genera also containing Gobipteryx. A close relationship between Gobipteryx and Yuornis was also supported in the scientific description of the latter. The results of the analyses of Wang et al. are shown in the cladogram below, with toothless taxa highlighted.

- - †Jeholornis prima
  - - †Confuciusornithiforms
    - - †Sapeornis
      - Ornithothoraces
        - Euornithes
        - †Enantiornithes
          - - Eopengornis
            - - Pengornis
              - Chiappeavis
          - - Elsornis
            - - - Vescornis
                - - Parabohaiornis
                  - Bohaiornis
              - - Eoenantiornis
                - - - Eocathayornis
                    - - Qiliania
                      - Enantiophoenix
                      - Shenqiornis
                      - - Feitianius
                        - Neuquenornis
                  - - - Eoalulavis
                      - - Concornis
                        - Cathayornis
                    - - - Gobipteryx
                        - - Imparavis
                          - Yuornis
                      - - Iberomesornis
                        - - - Shanweiniao
                            - Longipteryx
                          - - Rapaxavis
                            - Longirostravis

== See also ==
- List of bird species described in the 2020s
