= Weizhangzi–Tashan railway =

Railway line in China

The Weizhangzi–Tashan railway is a single-track railway line in China. It is 248 kilometres (154 mi) long and was built between 1970 and 1973.

The current level of service is one train in each direction per day.

== Connections ==
- Western terminus: Jinzhou–Chengde railway
- Eastern terminus at Huludao: Shenyang–Shanhaiguan railway
