= Xiangornis =

Xiangornis Temporal range: Lower Cretaceous

Scientific classification
- Domain: Eukaryota
- Kingdom: Animalia
- Phylum: Chordata
- Clade: Dinosauria
- Clade: Saurischia
- Clade: Theropoda
- Clade: Avialae
- Clade: †Enantiornithes
- Genus: †Xiangornis; Hu et al., 2012

Type species
- †Xiangornis shenmi Hu et al., 2012

Extinct genus of birds

Xiangornis is an enantiornithean bird from the Lower Cretaceous Jiufotang Formation of Western Liaoning, China.

In 2005, a bird fossil was discovered near Dapingfang in Chaoyang, in Western Liaoning.

The type species Xiangornis shenmi was in 2012 named and described by Hu Dongyu, Xu Xing, Hou Lianhai and Corwin Sullivan. The generic name is derived from Chinese xiáng, 翔, 'free flight', and Greek ὄρνις, ornis, "bird". The specific name is the Chinese shén mì, 神 秘, "mysterious", referring to the enigmatic combination of traits.

The holotype, PMOL-AB00245, had been found in the Jiufotang Formation dating from the Aptian, about 120 million years old. It consists of the left wing and adjacent parts of the shoulder girdle and the sternum.
