= Yan dynasty =

Yan dynasty may refer to:

- Former Yan (337–370)
- Later Yan (384–409)
- Southern Yan (398–410)
- Northern Yan (407–436)
- Yan (An–Shi) (756–763), established in the An Lushan Rebellion
- Yan (Five Dynasties period) (911–913)
