= Zhongjianornis =

Zhongjianornis Temporal range: Early Cretaceous, 120 Ma

Scientific classification
- Kingdom: Animalia
- Phylum: Chordata
- Class: Reptilia
- Clade: Dinosauria
- Clade: Saurischia
- Clade: Theropoda
- Clade: Avialae
- Clade: Euornithes
- Genus: †Zhongjianornis; Zhou, Zhang & Li, 2010
- Species: †Z. yangi

Binomial name
- †Zhongjianornis yangi Zhou, Zhang & Li, 2010

Extinct genus of dinosaurs

Zhongjianornis is a genus of beaked, pigeon-sized birds from the early Cretaceous period of China. It is known from one fossil found at Jianchang, Liaoning Province, in rocks of the Jiufotang Formation, representing the type species Zhongjianornis yangi.

The holotype specimen is in the collection of the Institute of Vertebrate Paleontology and Paleoanthropology in Beijing, and the species Z. yangi is named for the IVPP's founder, Yang Zhongjian. This specimen is catalogued under the accession number IVPP V15900. It consists of a complete skeleton, possibly only missing a few tail vertebrae.

== History and classification ==
Z. yangi was initially believed to be the most primitive (though not earliest) bird species that completely lacked teeth, and one of the most basal birds known. It was described by Zhou, Zhang and Li, in a paper published in January 2010 (though the paper had appeared on the Internet during 2009). They found that Zhongjianornis was more primitive than Confuciusornis, and that it predated the split between euornithean and enantiornithean birds. The authors also reported that Zhongjianornis shared features with very basal birds like Jeholornis, Sapeornis and Confuciusornis, including a highly expanded deltopectoral crest, and suggest that this was an early flight architecture that was replaced by an enlarged, keeled breastbone in more advanced birds.

However, later analysis of the anatomy of Z. yangi cast doubt on this interpretation of the bird as very primitive. Research published in 2012 found that some of the apparently primitive features were due to poor preservation of the bones, and that Zhongjianornis is more similar in anatomy to primitive euornitheans like Chaoyangia and Schizooura. A phylogenetic analysis showed that a very primitive position in the bird family tree for Z. yangi is unlikely given current evidence.
