= Jianchang County =

Jianchang 建昌县 Chienchang
- County
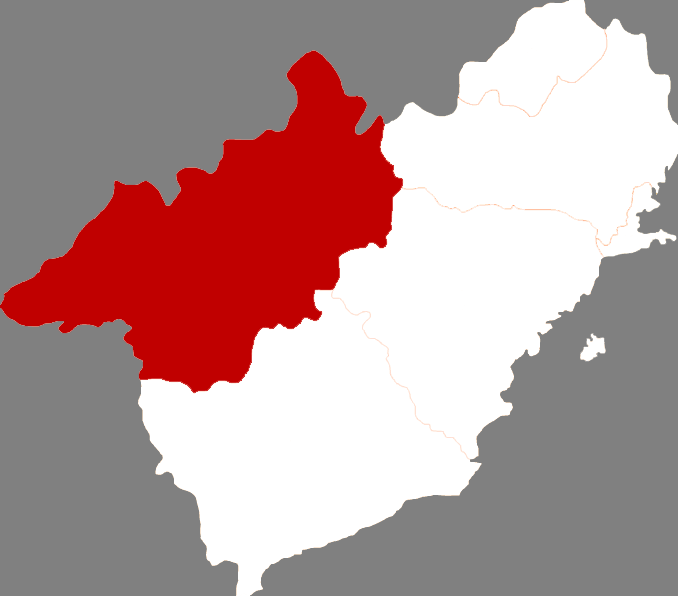
- Location in Huludao City

- Location in Liaoning
- Coordinates: 40°49′N 119°50′E
- Country: People's Republic of China
- Province: Liaoning
- Prefecture-level city: Huludao
- County seat: Jianchang Town (建昌镇)

Area
  - Total: 3,195 km^{2} (1,234 sq mi)
- Elevation: 369 m (1,211 ft)

Population (2020 census)
  - Total: 453,436
  - Density: 141.9/km^{2} (367.6/sq mi)
- Time zone: UTC+8 (China Standard)
- Postal code: 125300

Jianchang (Chinese: 建昌; pinyin: Jiànchāng) is a county of Huludao City in the southwest of Liaoning province, China. It is the largest division of Huludao, with an area of 3,195 square kilometres (1,234 sq mi), and population of 450,000 in 2020, located in mountainous terrain 85 kilometres (53 mi) west of that city, serviced by China National Highway 306. The Weizhangzi–Tashan railway also passes through the County.

Near the border with Hebei province lies the Jianchang Longtan Grand Canyon, home to wide variety of plants and animals. In 2009 a Troodontid dinosaur fossil with feathers was discovered in Jianchang. It is the earliest known such fossil and provides evidence for the link between dinosaurs and birds. Also found here, in Jiufotang Formation rocks, was the early modern bird Schizooura.

== Administrative divisions ==
There are seven towns, 21 townships, and one ethnic township in the county.

Towns:

- Jianchang (建昌镇)
- Bajiazi (八家子镇)
- Lamadong (喇嘛洞镇)
- Yaowangmiao (药王庙镇)
- Tangshenmiao (汤神庙镇)
- Linglongta (玲珑塔镇)
- Datun (大屯镇)

Townships:

- Maoniuyingzi Township (牦牛营子乡)
- Yaolugou Township (要路沟乡)
- Shifo Township (石佛乡)
- Suozhuyingzi Township (素珠营子乡)
- Xijianchang Township (西碱厂乡)
- Shihuiyaozi Township (石灰窑子乡)
- Wangbaoyingzi Township (王宝营子乡)
- Weijialing Township (魏家岭乡)
- Laodazhangzi Township (老大杖子乡)
- Toudaoyingzi Township (头道营子乡)
- Xinkailing Township (新开岭乡)
- Hezhangzi Township (贺杖子乡)
- Yangmadianzi Township (养马甸子乡)
- Heshangfangzi Township (和尚房子乡)
- Yangshuwanzi Township (杨树湾子乡)
- Heishanke Township (黑山科乡)
- Leijiadian Township (雷家店乡)
- Bashihan Township (巴什罕乡)
- Xiaodeyingzi Township (小德营子乡)
- Niangniangmiao Township (娘娘庙乡)
- Guzhangzi Township (谷杖子乡)
- Erdaowanzi Mongol Ethnic Township (二道弯子蒙古族乡)

== Climate ==
Climate data for Jianchang, elevation 367 m (1,204 ft), (1991–2020 normals, extremes 1981–2010)
Month	Jan	Feb	Mar	Apr	May	Jun	Jul	Aug	Sep	Oct	Nov	Dec	Year
Record high °C (°F)	12.6 (54.7)	19.1 (66.4)	28.5 (83.3)	32.3 (90.1)	38.2 (100.8)	38.4 (101.1)	40.7 (105.3)	37.3 (99.1)	34.9 (94.8)	31.1 (88.0)	21.4 (70.5)	18.3 (64.9)	40.7 (105.3)
Mean daily maximum °C (°F)	−1.4 (29.5)	2.7 (36.9)	9.6 (49.3)	17.9 (64.2)	24.5 (76.1)	27.8 (82.0)	29.1 (84.4)	28.4 (83.1)	24.5 (76.1)	17.1 (62.8)	7.2 (45.0)	0.2 (32.4)	15.6 (60.2)
Daily mean °C (°F)	−8.6 (16.5)	−4.5 (23.9)	2.8 (37.0)	11.4 (52.5)	18.0 (64.4)	21.7 (71.1)	23.9 (75.0)	22.7 (72.9)	17.5 (63.5)	9.9 (49.8)	0.7 (33.3)	−6.4 (20.5)	9.1 (48.4)
Mean daily minimum °C (°F)	−14.0 (6.8)	−10.3 (13.5)	−3.3 (26.1)	4.8 (40.6)	11.4 (52.5)	16.1 (61.0)	19.3 (66.7)	17.9 (64.2)	11.5 (52.7)	3.8 (38.8)	−4.4 (24.1)	−11.4 (11.5)	3.5 (38.2)
Record low °C (°F)	−28.3 (−18.9)	−24.3 (−11.7)	−19.7 (−3.5)	−6.9 (19.6)	1.5 (34.7)	6.7 (44.1)	11.8 (53.2)	7.5 (45.5)	−0.2 (31.6)	−8.2 (17.2)	−19.5 (−3.1)	−24.9 (−12.8)	−28.3 (−18.9)
Average precipitation mm (inches)	1.9 (0.07)	2.7 (0.11)	6.4 (0.25)	24.0 (0.94)	47.9 (1.89)	100.8 (3.97)	160.3 (6.31)	122.5 (4.82)	44.7 (1.76)	25.9 (1.02)	10.4 (0.41)	1.6 (0.06)	549.1 (21.61)
Average precipitation days (≥ 0.1 mm)	1.6	1.5	2.8	5.0	7.4	11.7	12.0	9.1	6.7	4.8	2.9	1.6	67.1
Average snowy days	2.6	2.1	2.9	1.3	0.1	0	0	0	0	0.6	3.1	2.7	15.4
Average relative humidity (%)	48	43	39	41	47	64	76	76	68	57	53	51	55
Mean monthly sunshine hours	196.1	195.2	234.3	244.0	266.7	231.7	213.0	229.4	233.7	223.9	185.4	184.2	2,637.6
Percentage possible sunshine	66	64	63	61	59	52	47	54	63	66	63	64	60
Source: China Meteorological Administration
