= Zhonghe Zhou =

Chinese paleontologist (born 1965)

Zhonghe Zhou (Chinese: 周忠和; born 19 January 1965 in Jiangdu, Jiangsu province) is a Chinese palaeontologist. He is best known for his study of the early evolution of birds. He described the ancient bird Confuciusornis.

Zhonghe graduated from Nanjing University and earned a Ph.D. in Biology in 1999 from the University of Kansas. He is the director of the Institute of Vertebrate Paleontology and Paleoanthropology of the Chinese Academy of Sciences in Beijing, and in 2010 was elected to the U.S. National Academy of Sciences. In 2025, he received the Future Science Prize.

Below is a list of taxa that Zhou has contributed to naming:

Year	Taxon	Authors
2026	Plumadraco bankoorum gen. et sp. nov.	Clark, O'Connor, Wang, Wang, Pruett-Jones, Zhang, Wang, Zheng, & Zhou
2025	Chromeornis funkyi gen. et sp. nov.	O'Connor, Wang, Clark, Kuo, Davila, Wang, Zheng, & Zhou
2024	Imparavis attenboroughi gen. et sp. nov.	Wang, Clark, O'Connor, Zhang, Wang, Zheng, & Zhou
2023	Fujianvenator prodigiosus gen. et sp. nov.	Xu, Wang, Chen, Dong, Lin, Xu, Tang, You, Zhou, Wang, He, Li, Zhang, & Zhou
2023	Meilifeilong youhao gen. et sp. nov.	Wang, Kellner, Jiang, Chen, Costa, Cheng, Zhang, Vila Nova, Campos, Sayão, Rodrigues, Bantim, Saraiva, & Zhou
2020	Mengciusornis dentatus gen. et sp. nov.	Wang, O'Connor, Zhou, & Zhou
2019	Ambopteryx longibrachium gen. et sp. nov.	Wang, O'Connor, Xu, & Zhou
2019	Avimaia schweitzerae gen. et sp. nov.	Bailleul, O'Connor, Zhang, Li, Wang, Lamanna, Zhu, & Zhou
2019	Shangyang graciles gen. et sp. nov.	Wang & Zhou
2018	Jinguofortis perplexus gen. et sp. nov.	Wang, Stidham, & Zhou
2017	Cruralispennia multidonta gen. et sp. nov.	Wang, O'Connor, Pan, & Zhou
2015	Archaeornithura meemannae gen. et sp. nov.	Wang, Zheng, O'Connor, Lloyd, Wang, Wang, Zhang, & Zhou
2014	Falco hezhengensis sp. nov.	Li, Zhou, Deng, Li, & Clarke
2014	Parvavis chuxiongensis gen. et sp. nov.	Wang, Zhou, & Xu
2014	Eopengornis martini gen. et sp. nov.	Wang, O'Connor, Zheng, Wang, Hu, & Zhou
2014	Piscivoravis lii gen. et sp. nov.	Zhou, Zhou, & O'Connor
2014	Hamipterus tianshanensis gen. et sp. nov.	Wang, Kellner, Jiang, Wang, Ma, Paidoula, Cheng, Rodrigues, Meng, Zhang, Li, & Zhou
2012	Jeholornis palmapenis sp. nov.	O'Connor, Sun, Xu, Wang, & Zhou
2010	Zhongjianornis yangi gen. et sp. nov.	Zhou, Zhang, & Li
2008	Pengornis houi gen. et sp. nov.	Zhou, Clarke, & Zhang
2008	Eoconfuciusornis zhengi gen. et sp. nov.	Zhang, Zhou, & Benton
2008	Epidexipteryx hui gen. et sp. nov.	Zhang, Zhou, Xu, Wang, & Sullivan
2008	Pengornis houi gen. et sp. nov.	Zhou, Clarke, & Zhang
2006	Archaeorhynchus spathula gen. et sp. nov.	Zhou & Zhang
2005	Hongshanornis longicresta gen. et sp. nov.	Zhou & Zhang
2005	Nurhachius ignaciobritoi gen. et sp. nov.	Wang, Kellner, Zhou, & Campos
2005	Feilongus youngi gen. et sp. nov.	Wang, Kellner, Zhou, & Campos
2004	Sapeornis chaoyangensis gen. et sp. nov.	Zhou & Zhang
2003	Sinopterus dongi gen. et sp. nov.	Wang & Zhou
2002	Jeholornis prima gen. et sp. nov.	Zhou & Zhang
2002	Jeholopterus ningchengensis gen. et sp. nov.	Wang, Zhou, Zhang, & Xu
2000	Microraptor zhaoianus gen. et sp. nov.	Xu, Zhou, & Wang
