= Jiufotang Formation =

Geological formation in Liaoning, China

- Stratigraphic range: Barremian–Albian; 124.44–112.25 Ma
- Type: Geological formation
- Unit of: Jehol Group
- Sub-units: Shangheshou & Meileyingzi Beds
- Underlies: Fuxin & Shahai Formations
- Overlies: Yixian Formation

Lithology
- Primary: Mudstone
- Other: Sandstone

Location
- Coordinates: 41.2°N 119.4°E
- Approximate paleocoordinates: 44.4°N 119.5°E
- Region: Liaoning
- Country: China

Type section
- Named for: Jiufotang, Pingfangzi, Liaoning
- Named by: Ryuji Endo
- Year defined: 1934
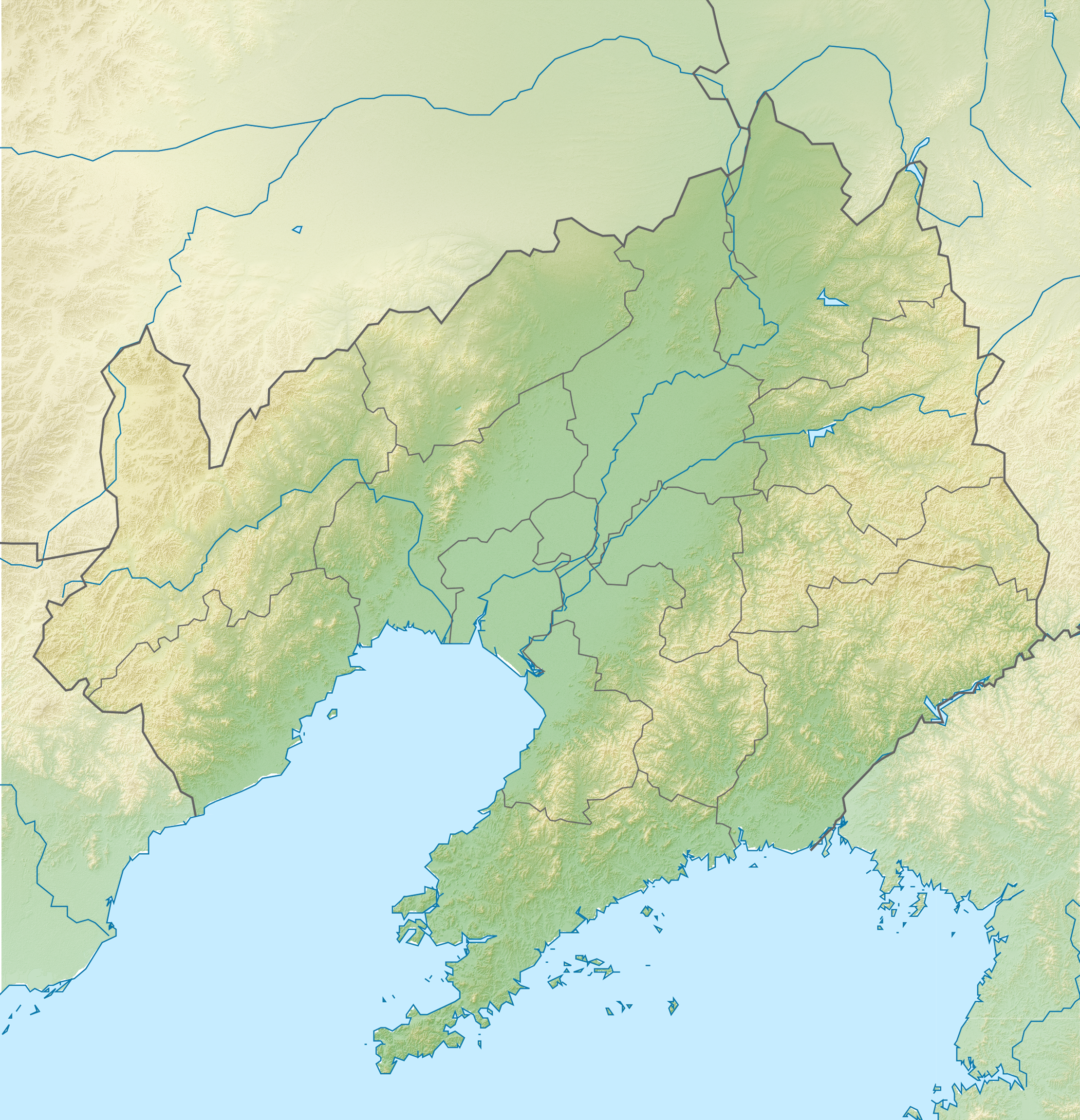
- Jiufotang Formation (China) Jiufotang Formation (Liaoning)

The Jiufotang Formation (Chinese: 九佛堂组; pinyin: jiǔfótáng zǔ; previously transliterated as Chiufotang Formation) is an Early Cretaceous geological formation in Chaoyang, Liaoning which has yielded fossils of feathered dinosaurs, primitive birds, pterosaurs, and other organisms (see Jehol Biota). It is a member of the Jehol group. The exact age of the Jiufotang has been debated for years, with estimates ranging from the Late Jurassic to the Early Cretaceous. New uranium-lead dates reveal the formation is deposited in the Aptian stage of the Early Cretaceous. Fossils of Microraptor and Jeholornis are from the Jiufotang. The fossil layers containing lagersatte conditions date from 124.44 to 121.09 Ma.

== Fossil content ==
Color key
Taxon	Reclassified taxon	Taxon falsely reported as present	Dubious taxon or junior synonym	Ichnotaxon	Ootaxon	Morphotaxon

Notes
Uncertain or tentative taxa are in small text; ~~crossed out~~ taxa are discredited.

=== Choristoderans ===
Genus	Species	County	Member	Abundance	Notes
Philydrosaurus	P. proseilus				Monjurosuchid
Ikechosaurus	I. pijiagouensis				Simoedosaurid
Liaoxisaurus	L. chaoyangensis				Simoedosaurid
Hyphalosaurus	H. baitaigouensis				Hyphalosaurid

=== Fish ===
Genus	Species	County	Member	Notes	Images
Caeruleum	C. miraculum	Weichang		A lamprey	
Caeruleum	C. gracilis	Weichang		A lamprey	
Hebeimyzon	H. weichangensis	Weichang		A lamprey	
Jinanichthys	J. longicephalus			An osteoglossomorph	
Lycoptera	L. davidi			An osteoglossomorph	
Peipiaosteus	P. pani			A fish related to sturgeons	
Protopsephurus	P. liui			A paddlefish	
Sinamia	S. zdanskyi			An amiiform	

=== Mammaliamorphs ===
Several mammaliamorph specimens have been found from the Jiufotang, but only a few have been formally described and named.

Genus	Species	County	Member	Material	Notes
Cokotherium	C. jiufotangensis			Partial skeleton	A eutherian
Dongoconodon	D. platycauda			A nearly complete skeleton	Eutriconodont, family unknown
Fossiomanus	F. sinensis			A nearly complete skeleton	A tritylodontid cynodont, likely the youngest known non-mammalian synapsid
Liaoconodon	L. hui			A nearly complete skeleton	A eutriconodont
Unnamed mammal	Unnamed			Partial remains including a foot and fragments of the skull	A mammal similar to Eomaia and Sinodelphys from the Yixian Formation. Found as stomach contents of Microraptor zhaoianus.

=== Ornithischians ===
Genus	Species	Locality	County	Member	Material	Notes	Images
Chuanqilong	C. chaoyangensis		Liaoning		A nearly complete skeleton missing only the distal portion of the caudal series.	A basal ankylosaurid, sister taxon to Liaoningosaurus.	Liaoningosaurus paradoxus Psittacosaurus meileyingensis Psittacosaurus mongoliensis
Liaoningosaurus	L. paradoxus	Baicaigou locality	Liaoning		A nearly complete, articulated skeleton	A basal ankylosaurid.	Liaoningosaurus paradoxus Psittacosaurus meileyingensis Psittacosaurus mongoliensis
Psittacosaurus	P. meileyingensis			Meileyingzi Bed	"[Four] individuals, [two] complete skulls."	A ceratopsian.	Liaoningosaurus paradoxus Psittacosaurus meileyingensis Psittacosaurus mongoliensis
Psittacosaurus	P. mongoliensis			Shangheshou and Meileyingzi Beds		A ceratopsian.	Liaoningosaurus paradoxus Psittacosaurus meileyingensis Psittacosaurus mongoliensis

=== Pterosaurs ===
Genus	Species	County	Member	Material	Notes	Images
Chaoyangopterus	C. zhangi				A chaoyangopterid	Feilongus Liaoningopterus Meilifeilong Nemicolopterus Nurhachius Sinopterus and Huaxiadraco Vesperopterylus
Eoazhdarcho	E. liaoxiensis				A chaoyangopterid	Feilongus Liaoningopterus Meilifeilong Nemicolopterus Nurhachius Sinopterus and Huaxiadraco Vesperopterylus
Feilongus	F. youngi		Jianshangou Bed		A boreopterid	Feilongus Liaoningopterus Meilifeilong Nemicolopterus Nurhachius Sinopterus and Huaxiadraco Vesperopterylus
Forfexopterus	F. jeholensis				A ctenochasmatid	Feilongus Liaoningopterus Meilifeilong Nemicolopterus Nurhachius Sinopterus and Huaxiadraco Vesperopterylus
Gladocephaloideus	G. jingangshanensis		Jingangshan Bed		A ctenochasmatid	Feilongus Liaoningopterus Meilifeilong Nemicolopterus Nurhachius Sinopterus and Huaxiadraco Vesperopterylus
Guidraco	G. venator				A pteranodontoid	Feilongus Liaoningopterus Meilifeilong Nemicolopterus Nurhachius Sinopterus and Huaxiadraco Vesperopterylus
Hongshanopterus	H. lacustris				An istiodactylid	Feilongus Liaoningopterus Meilifeilong Nemicolopterus Nurhachius Sinopterus and Huaxiadraco Vesperopterylus
Huaxiadraco	H. corollatus			Multiple specimens	A tapejarid	Feilongus Liaoningopterus Meilifeilong Nemicolopterus Nurhachius Sinopterus and Huaxiadraco Vesperopterylus
"Huaxiapterus"	"H." benxiensis				A tapejarid; synonymized with Huaxiadraco in 2023	Feilongus Liaoningopterus Meilifeilong Nemicolopterus Nurhachius Sinopterus and Huaxiadraco Vesperopterylus
Ikrandraco	I. avatar				A pteranodontoid	Feilongus Liaoningopterus Meilifeilong Nemicolopterus Nurhachius Sinopterus and Huaxiadraco Vesperopterylus
Jidapterus	J. edentus				A chaoyangopterid	Feilongus Liaoningopterus Meilifeilong Nemicolopterus Nurhachius Sinopterus and Huaxiadraco Vesperopterylus
Liaoningopterus	L. gui				A pteranodontoid	Feilongus Liaoningopterus Meilifeilong Nemicolopterus Nurhachius Sinopterus and Huaxiadraco Vesperopterylus
Liaoxipterus	L. brachyognathus				An istiodactylid	Feilongus Liaoningopterus Meilifeilong Nemicolopterus Nurhachius Sinopterus and Huaxiadraco Vesperopterylus
Linlongopterus	L. jennyae				A pteranodontoid	Feilongus Liaoningopterus Meilifeilong Nemicolopterus Nurhachius Sinopterus and Huaxiadraco Vesperopterylus
Meilifeilong	M. youhao	Jianchang		A nearly complete skeleton and a partial skull	A chaoyangopterid	Feilongus Liaoningopterus Meilifeilong Nemicolopterus Nurhachius Sinopterus and Huaxiadraco Vesperopterylus
Nemicolopterus	N. crypticus				A tapejaromorph; previously and still occasionally thought to be a tapejarid. Most likely a juvenile, hence small size.	Feilongus Liaoningopterus Meilifeilong Nemicolopterus Nurhachius Sinopterus and Huaxiadraco Vesperopterylus
Nurhachius	N. ignaciobritoi				An istiodactylid	Feilongus Liaoningopterus Meilifeilong Nemicolopterus Nurhachius Sinopterus and Huaxiadraco Vesperopterylus
Pangupterus	P. liui				A pterodactyloid	Feilongus Liaoningopterus Meilifeilong Nemicolopterus Nurhachius Sinopterus and Huaxiadraco Vesperopterylus
Shenzhoupterus	S. chaoyangensis				A chaoyangopterid	Feilongus Liaoningopterus Meilifeilong Nemicolopterus Nurhachius Sinopterus and Huaxiadraco Vesperopterylus
Shenzhoupterus	S. sanyainus				A chaoyangopterid	Feilongus Liaoningopterus Meilifeilong Nemicolopterus Nurhachius Sinopterus and Huaxiadraco Vesperopterylus
Sinopterus	S. dongi				A tapejarid	Feilongus Liaoningopterus Meilifeilong Nemicolopterus Nurhachius Sinopterus and Huaxiadraco Vesperopterylus
Sinopterus	S. jii				Previously known as Huxiapterus jii	Feilongus Liaoningopterus Meilifeilong Nemicolopterus Nurhachius Sinopterus and Huaxiadraco Vesperopterylus
Vesperopterylus	V. lamadongensis				An anurognathid	Feilongus Liaoningopterus Meilifeilong Nemicolopterus Nurhachius Sinopterus and Huaxiadraco Vesperopterylus

=== Saurischians ===
Skeletal and dental remains are known, the latter was assigned to an indeterminate titanosauriform.

==== Enantiornithines ====
Genus	Species	County	Member	Material	Notes	Images
Alethoalaornis	A. agitornis				An enantiornithean	Brevirostruavis Cuspirostrisornis Longipteryx Plumadraco Rapaxavis Sinornis Yuanchuavis
Boluochia	B. zhengi			"Partial skull [and] partial postcranium."	A longipterygid	Brevirostruavis Cuspirostrisornis Longipteryx Plumadraco Rapaxavis Sinornis Yuanchuavis
Brevirostruavis	B. macrohyoideus			"an extremely elongate bony hyoid element (only slightly shorter than the skull), combined with a short cranial rostrum."	An enantiornithine	Brevirostruavis Cuspirostrisornis Longipteryx Plumadraco Rapaxavis Sinornis Yuanchuavis
Cathayornis	C. aberransis				An enantiornithine	Brevirostruavis Cuspirostrisornis Longipteryx Plumadraco Rapaxavis Sinornis Yuanchuavis
Cathayornis	C. caudatus				Nomen dubium	Brevirostruavis Cuspirostrisornis Longipteryx Plumadraco Rapaxavis Sinornis Yuanchuavis
Cathayornis	C. yandica			"Partial skeleton."	An enantiornithean	Brevirostruavis Cuspirostrisornis Longipteryx Plumadraco Rapaxavis Sinornis Yuanchuavis
Cuspirostrisornis	C. houi				A possible avisaurid	Brevirostruavis Cuspirostrisornis Longipteryx Plumadraco Rapaxavis Sinornis Yuanchuavis
Dapingfangornis	D. sentisorhinus				An enantiornithean	Brevirostruavis Cuspirostrisornis Longipteryx Plumadraco Rapaxavis Sinornis Yuanchuavis
Eocathayornis	E. walkeri			"Partial skeleton."	An enantiornithean	Brevirostruavis Cuspirostrisornis Longipteryx Plumadraco Rapaxavis Sinornis Yuanchuavis
Gracilornis	G. jiufotangensis				An enantiornithean	Brevirostruavis Cuspirostrisornis Longipteryx Plumadraco Rapaxavis Sinornis Yuanchuavis
Imparavis	I. attenboroughi	Jianchang		An articulated, nearly complete specimen		Brevirostruavis Cuspirostrisornis Longipteryx Plumadraco Rapaxavis Sinornis Yuanchuavis
Huoshanornis	H. huji				An enantiornithean	Brevirostruavis Cuspirostrisornis Longipteryx Plumadraco Rapaxavis Sinornis Yuanchuavis
Largirostrornis	L. sexdentoris				An enantiornithean	Brevirostruavis Cuspirostrisornis Longipteryx Plumadraco Rapaxavis Sinornis Yuanchuavis
Longchengornis	L. sanyanensis				An enantiornithean	Brevirostruavis Cuspirostrisornis Longipteryx Plumadraco Rapaxavis Sinornis Yuanchuavis
Longipteryx	L. chaoyangensis				A longipterygid	Brevirostruavis Cuspirostrisornis Longipteryx Plumadraco Rapaxavis Sinornis Yuanchuavis
Musivavis	M. amabilis			"A nearly complete and articulated skeleton preserved in a single slab."	An euenantiornithean	Brevirostruavis Cuspirostrisornis Longipteryx Plumadraco Rapaxavis Sinornis Yuanchuavis
Plumadraco	P. bankoorum	Near Xiaotaizi Village, Jianchang County		A complete, articulated specimen preserved in a single slab primarily in dorsal aspect with feathers preserved around the head, body, wings, and tail	A bohaiornithid	Brevirostruavis Cuspirostrisornis Longipteryx Plumadraco Rapaxavis Sinornis Yuanchuavis
Rapaxavis	R. pani				A longipterygid	Brevirostruavis Cuspirostrisornis Longipteryx Plumadraco Rapaxavis Sinornis Yuanchuavis
Shangyang	S. graciles				An enantiornithean	Brevirostruavis Cuspirostrisornis Longipteryx Plumadraco Rapaxavis Sinornis Yuanchuavis
Sinornis	S. santensis			"Partial skull [and] many nearly complete postcranial skeletons."	An enantiornithean	Brevirostruavis Cuspirostrisornis Longipteryx Plumadraco Rapaxavis Sinornis Yuanchuavis
Xiangornis	X. shenmi				An enantiornithean	Brevirostruavis Cuspirostrisornis Longipteryx Plumadraco Rapaxavis Sinornis Yuanchuavis
Yuanchuavis	Y. kompsosoura				An pengornithid	Brevirostruavis Cuspirostrisornis Longipteryx Plumadraco Rapaxavis Sinornis Yuanchuavis

==== Euornithines ====
Genus	Species	County	Member	Material	Notes	Images
Aberratiodontus	A. wui				Junior synonym of Yanornis martini	Gansus zheni (≈Iteravis huchzermeyeri Kunpengornis anhuimusei Shuilingornis angelai Piscivoravis lii Yanornis martini Yixianornis grabaui
Chaoyangia	C. beishanensis			"Partial skeleton."	A basal euornithean	Gansus zheni (≈Iteravis huchzermeyeri Kunpengornis anhuimusei Shuilingornis angelai Piscivoravis lii Yanornis martini Yixianornis grabaui
Iteravis	I. huchzermeyeri			Multiple complete, articulated skeletons	A possible gansuid basal euornithean. Some authors consider Gansus zheni, another species named from the same locality, to be a junior synonym.	Gansus zheni (≈Iteravis huchzermeyeri Kunpengornis anhuimusei Shuilingornis angelai Piscivoravis lii Yanornis martini Yixianornis grabaui
Jianchangornis	J. microdonta	Jianchang			A basal euornithean	Gansus zheni (≈Iteravis huchzermeyeri Kunpengornis anhuimusei Shuilingornis angelai Piscivoravis lii Yanornis martini Yixianornis grabaui
Kunpengornis	K. anhuimusei	Jianchang		A nearly complete and articulated skeleton	A piscivorous euornithean	Gansus zheni (≈Iteravis huchzermeyeri Kunpengornis anhuimusei Shuilingornis angelai Piscivoravis lii Yanornis martini Yixianornis grabaui
Mengciusornis	M. dentatus				A schizoourid	Gansus zheni (≈Iteravis huchzermeyeri Kunpengornis anhuimusei Shuilingornis angelai Piscivoravis lii Yanornis martini Yixianornis grabaui
Parahongshanornis	P. chaoyangensis				A hongshanornithid	Gansus zheni (≈Iteravis huchzermeyeri Kunpengornis anhuimusei Shuilingornis angelai Piscivoravis lii Yanornis martini Yixianornis grabaui
Piscivoravis	P. lii				An ornithuromorph	Gansus zheni (≈Iteravis huchzermeyeri Kunpengornis anhuimusei Shuilingornis angelai Piscivoravis lii Yanornis martini Yixianornis grabaui
Schizooura	S. lii	Jianchang			A schizoourid with long, forked tail feathers	Gansus zheni (≈Iteravis huchzermeyeri Kunpengornis anhuimusei Shuilingornis angelai Piscivoravis lii Yanornis martini Yixianornis grabaui
Similiyanornis	S. brevipectus				An ornithuromorph	Gansus zheni (≈Iteravis huchzermeyeri Kunpengornis anhuimusei Shuilingornis angelai Piscivoravis lii Yanornis martini Yixianornis grabaui
Shuilingornis	S. angelai				A gansuid	Gansus zheni (≈Iteravis huchzermeyeri Kunpengornis anhuimusei Shuilingornis angelai Piscivoravis lii Yanornis martini Yixianornis grabaui
Songlingornis	S. linghensis				An ornithuromorph	Gansus zheni (≈Iteravis huchzermeyeri Kunpengornis anhuimusei Shuilingornis angelai Piscivoravis lii Yanornis martini Yixianornis grabaui
Yanornis	Y. martini				An ornithuromorph	Gansus zheni (≈Iteravis huchzermeyeri Kunpengornis anhuimusei Shuilingornis angelai Piscivoravis lii Yanornis martini Yixianornis grabaui
Yixianornis	Y. grabaui			A near complete skeleton	An ornithuromorph	Gansus zheni (≈Iteravis huchzermeyeri Kunpengornis anhuimusei Shuilingornis angelai Piscivoravis lii Yanornis martini Yixianornis grabaui
Zhongjianornis	Z. yangi			A complete skeleton	A basal euornithean	Gansus zheni (≈Iteravis huchzermeyeri Kunpengornis anhuimusei Shuilingornis angelai Piscivoravis lii Yanornis martini Yixianornis grabaui

==== Non-ornithothoracean theropods ====
A large theropod tooth representing a distinct taxon from Sinotyrannus is known.

Color key: Taxon / Reclassified taxon / Taxon falsely reported as present / Dubious taxon or junior synonym / Ichnotaxon / Ootaxon / Morphotaxon	Notes; Uncertain or tentative taxa are in small text; ~~crossed out~~ taxa are discredited.

Genus	Species	County	Member	Material	Notes	Images
Changzhousaurus	C. sinensis	Jianchang		A nearly complete skeleton with extensive plumage, preserved on a slab and counterslab	A paravian of uncertain affinities derived from a pennaraptoran	Changzhousaurus sinensis Confuciusornis sanctus Jeholornis prima Microraptor gui Norellraptor barsboldi Sinotyrannus kazuoensis Wulong bohaiensis
Chongmingia	C. zhengi			A partial skeleton with preserved soft tissues	A jinguofortisid avialan	Changzhousaurus sinensis Confuciusornis sanctus Jeholornis prima Microraptor gui Norellraptor barsboldi Sinotyrannus kazuoensis Wulong bohaiensis
Confuciusornis	C. sanctus				A primitive short-tailed avialan (pygostylian). Also present in the Yixian Formation	Changzhousaurus sinensis Confuciusornis sanctus Jeholornis prima Microraptor gui Norellraptor barsboldi Sinotyrannus kazuoensis Wulong bohaiensis
Confuciusornis	C. jianchangensis	Liaoning				Changzhousaurus sinensis Confuciusornis sanctus Jeholornis prima Microraptor gui Norellraptor barsboldi Sinotyrannus kazuoensis Wulong bohaiensis
Cratonavis	C. zhui	Jianchang		A complete skeleton with preserved feathers	A jinguofortisid avialan	Changzhousaurus sinensis Confuciusornis sanctus Jeholornis prima Microraptor gui Norellraptor barsboldi Sinotyrannus kazuoensis Wulong bohaiensis
Dalianraptor	D. cuhe				Nomen dubium, named from a forged artificially assembled specimen.	Changzhousaurus sinensis Confuciusornis sanctus Jeholornis prima Microraptor gui Norellraptor barsboldi Sinotyrannus kazuoensis Wulong bohaiensis
Jeholornis	J. prima				A jeholornithiform avialan, also present in the Yixian Formation	Changzhousaurus sinensis Confuciusornis sanctus Jeholornis prima Microraptor gui Norellraptor barsboldi Sinotyrannus kazuoensis Wulong bohaiensis
Jeholornis	J. palmapenis				A jeholornithiform avialan	Changzhousaurus sinensis Confuciusornis sanctus Jeholornis prima Microraptor gui Norellraptor barsboldi Sinotyrannus kazuoensis Wulong bohaiensis
Kompsornis	K. longicaudatus			"Nearly complete specimen".	A jeholornithiform avialan	Changzhousaurus sinensis Confuciusornis sanctus Jeholornis prima Microraptor gui Norellraptor barsboldi Sinotyrannus kazuoensis Wulong bohaiensis
Microraptor	M. gui		Shangheshou Bed	Extremely common	Could be synonym of Microraptor zhaoianus	Changzhousaurus sinensis Confuciusornis sanctus Jeholornis prima Microraptor gui Norellraptor barsboldi Sinotyrannus kazuoensis Wulong bohaiensis
Microraptor	M. zhaoianus		Shangheshou Bed	"At least [three] partial semiarticulated postcrania and several skulls." Feathered integument is also preserved.	A dromaeosaurid.	Changzhousaurus sinensis Confuciusornis sanctus Jeholornis prima Microraptor gui Norellraptor barsboldi Sinotyrannus kazuoensis Wulong bohaiensis
Neimengornis	N. rectusmim				A jeholornithiform avialan	Changzhousaurus sinensis Confuciusornis sanctus Jeholornis prima Microraptor gui Norellraptor barsboldi Sinotyrannus kazuoensis Wulong bohaiensis
Norellraptor	N. barsboldi	Lamadong Town, Jianchang		A single complete skeleton including impressions of the plumage (specimen 130108-MHGU-F4281)	A dromeosaur	Changzhousaurus sinensis Confuciusornis sanctus Jeholornis prima Microraptor gui Norellraptor barsboldi Sinotyrannus kazuoensis Wulong bohaiensis
Omnivoropteryx	O. sinousaorum				An omnivoropterygiform avialan	Changzhousaurus sinensis Confuciusornis sanctus Jeholornis prima Microraptor gui Norellraptor barsboldi Sinotyrannus kazuoensis Wulong bohaiensis
Sapeornis	S. angustis			"Nearly complete skeleton without skull."	An omnivoropterygiform, a primitive short-tailed avialan	Changzhousaurus sinensis Confuciusornis sanctus Jeholornis prima Microraptor gui Norellraptor barsboldi Sinotyrannus kazuoensis Wulong bohaiensis
Sapeornis	S. chaoyangensis				An omnivoropterygiform, a primitive short-tailed avialan	Changzhousaurus sinensis Confuciusornis sanctus Jeholornis prima Microraptor gui Norellraptor barsboldi Sinotyrannus kazuoensis Wulong bohaiensis
Shenshiornis	Shenshiornis primita				An omnivoropterygiform avialan	Changzhousaurus sinensis Confuciusornis sanctus Jeholornis prima Microraptor gui Norellraptor barsboldi Sinotyrannus kazuoensis Wulong bohaiensis
Similicaudipteryx	S. yixianensis				An oviraptorosaur	Changzhousaurus sinensis Confuciusornis sanctus Jeholornis prima Microraptor gui Norellraptor barsboldi Sinotyrannus kazuoensis Wulong bohaiensis
Sinotyrannus	S. kazuoensis				A tyrannosauroid	Changzhousaurus sinensis Confuciusornis sanctus Jeholornis prima Microraptor gui Norellraptor barsboldi Sinotyrannus kazuoensis Wulong bohaiensis
Wulong	W. bohaiensis	Chaoyang, Liaoning		Complete articulated skeleton (D2933).	A dromaeosaurid	Changzhousaurus sinensis Confuciusornis sanctus Jeholornis prima Microraptor gui Norellraptor barsboldi Sinotyrannus kazuoensis Wulong bohaiensis

=== Crustaceans ===
Genus	Species	County	Member	Material	Notes	Images
Eosestheria	Eosestheria middendorfii				A clam shrimp	

=== Plants ===
Genus	Species	County	Member	Material	Notes	Images
Czekanowskia	C. rigida				A member of Czekanowskiales, Dominant	
Ginkgo	G. digitata				A member of Ginkgoales	
Elatocladus	E. pinnatus				Conifer foliage	
Pityolepis	P. ovatus				Conifer cone	
Leptostrobus	L. sinensis				A member of Czekanowksiales, occasionally misspelled "Leptosthrobus"	
Baiera	B. valida				A member of Ginkgoales	
Baiera	B. cf. gracilis				A member of Ginkgoales	
Ginkgoites	G. trancata				A member of Ginkgoales, dominant	
Ginkgoites	G. trancatus				A member of Ginkgoales, dominant	
Podozamites	P. sp.				Conifer foliage	
Sphenopteris	S. sp.				Seed plant foliage	

== See also ==
- Yixian Formation
- List of dinosaur-bearing rock formations
