= Songlingornis =

Songlingornis Temporal range: Early Cretaceous, 120 Ma

Scientific classification
- Kingdom: Animalia
- Phylum: Chordata
- Class: Reptilia
- Clade: Dinosauria
- Clade: Saurischia
- Clade: Theropoda
- Clade: Avialae
- Family: †Songlingornithidae
- Genus: †Songlingornis; Hou, 1997
- Species: †S. linghensis

Binomial name
- †Songlingornis linghensis Hou, 1997

Extinct genus of dinosaurs

Songlingornis is an extinct genus of ornithuromorph dinosaurs from the Early Cretaceous. Its fossils have been found in the Jiufotang Formation of Liaoning (PRC). The age of these rocks is somewhat disputed, but probably around the early Aptian, 125-120 million years ago. Only one species, Songlingornis linghensis, is known at present.

It was a close relative of Yanornis and together with this and Yixianornis may form a clade. It is sometimes considered to be the same genus as Yanornis (which, described after Songlingornis, would then be merged into that taxon), but this is not universally accepted.
