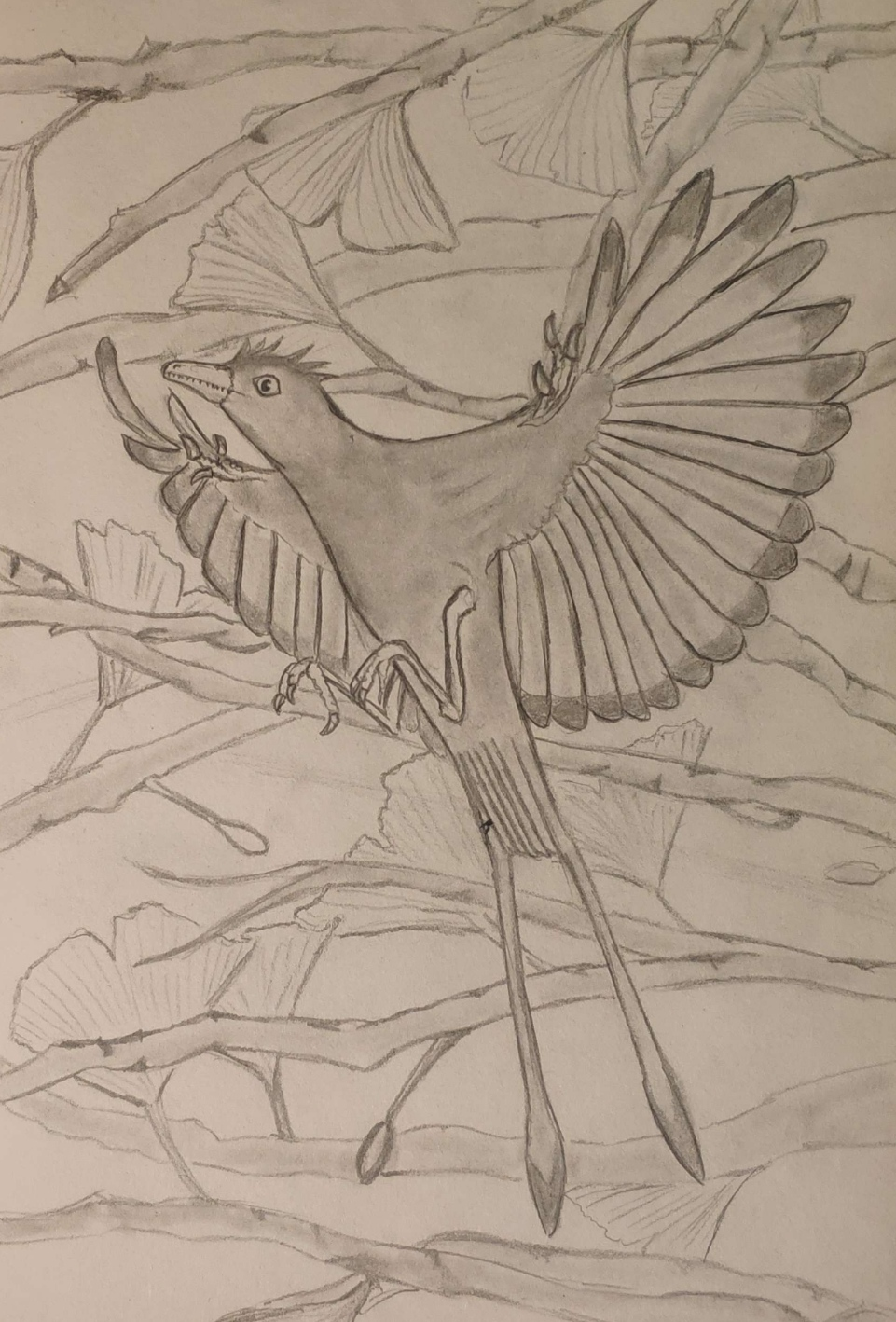
- Artist's view of Jianchangornis microdonta

Scientific classification
- Kingdom: Animalia
- Phylum: Chordata
- Class: Reptilia
- Clade: Dinosauria
- Clade: Saurischia
- Clade: Theropoda
- Clade: Avialae
- Clade: Ornithothoraces
- Clade: Euornithes
- Genus: †Jianchangornis; Zhou et al., 2009
- Species: †J. microdonta

Binomial name
- †Jianchangornis microdonta Zhou et al., 2009

= Jianchangornis =

Jianchangornis Temporal range: Early Cretaceous, 120 Ma

Extinct genus of dinosaurs

Jianchangornis a genus of basal ornithuromorph dinosaurs. Fossils were recovered from the Jiufotang Formation at Liaoning, China.

== Description ==
A specimen IVPP-V16708 includes skull, partial skeleton and feathers. These remains indicate a subadult individual with a length of 33 cm (13 in), hip height of 26 cm (10 in), and weight of 1.2 kg (2.6 lb).
