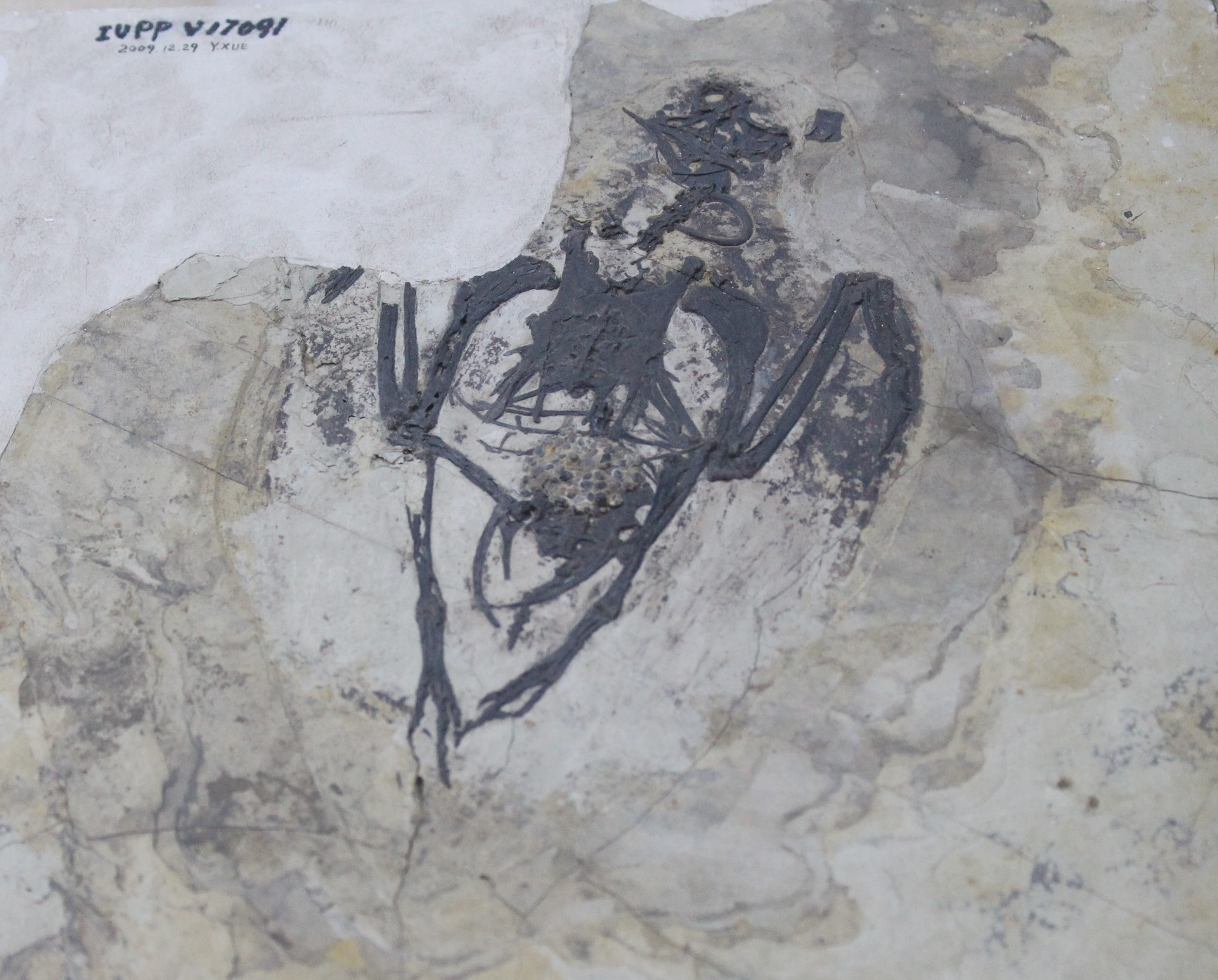
- Fossil specimen, Paleozoological Museum of China

Scientific classification
- Kingdom: Animalia
- Phylum: Chordata
- Class: Reptilia
- Clade: Dinosauria
- Clade: Saurischia
- Clade: Theropoda
- Clade: Avialae
- Clade: Ornithothoraces
- Clade: Euornithes
- Genus: †Archaeorhynchus; Zhou & Zhang, 2006
- Species: †A. spathula

Binomial name
- †Archaeorhynchus spathula Zhou & Zhang, 2006

= Archaeorhynchus =

Archaeorhynchus Temporal range: Early Cretaceous, 125–120 Ma

Extinct genus of dinosaurs

Archaeorhynchus (meaning "ancient snout") is a genus of beaked avialans from the early Cretaceous period. A fossil of its only known species, Archaeorhynchus spathula, was first reported in 2005 by Zhou & Zhang to have been found in Yixian Formation rocks at Yixian, Liaoning province, China, showing a well-preserved and essentially complete skeleton. Two more complete specimens were found in Lower Cretaceous deposits of Jianchang, Liaoning, northeastern China, preserving new anatomical information. These deposits are 120 million years old, whereas the original specimen was 125 million years old, meaning the age range for this species is 125-120Ma.

Archaeorhychus is one of the earliest avialans known to have had a beak, and represents one of the most basal ornithuromorph avialans. The fossils preserved feathers associated with the neck, head and tail regions. The fossils also show grooves and openings/ holes (foramina) on the tips of the upper and lower jaws, suggesting that it supported a horny bill. Other features present suggest powerful flight capability similar to that of some modern birds. It has also been suggested that it had an herbivorous diet based on preserved gizzard stones found in its stomach.

== Description ==
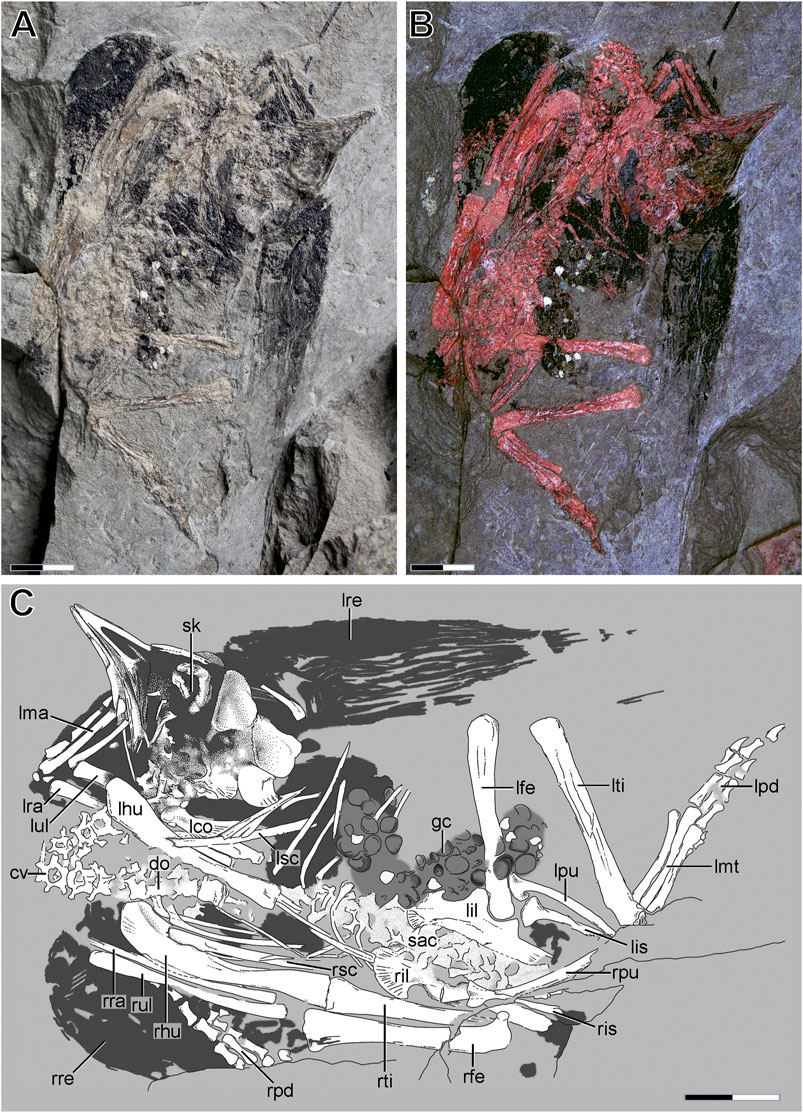
Juvenile

Archaeorhynchus was a medium-sized avialan, measuring about 20 centimetres (7.9 in) long, hip height of 15.5 cm (6.1 in), and weight of 275 g (9.7 oz). The three specimens have well-preserved skulls showing important anatomical information, including: slender maxilla and premaxilla, short nasals and discrete mandible elements. The skull bones of the holotype were slightly dislocated due to transportation. All three known fossil specimens have a preserved vertebrae column, although they are not entirely complete. However, when combining the three specimens together, the whole spine could be reconstructed. Based on reconstruction of the vertebrae, it was estimated that the backbone had 9 or 10 neck vertebrae and 9 or 10 tail vertebrae. The back vertebrae were not preserved. Archaeorhynchus had slender and curved vertebral ribs (ribs that do not attach to the breastbone) with robust and strong bases. The pectoral girdle had a robust and U-shaped wishbone, a slightly curved shoulder blade, a short and robust coracoid and a broad and deeply notched breastbone. The hips had an unfused ilium, a slender and curved pubis with a small pubic foot and a strap like ischium which is shorter than the pubis.

The hind limb was shorter than the forelimb. The forelimbs had a humerus and a radius which were straighter and shorter than the ulna. The forelimbs also preserved the major and minor metacarpals as well as the finger bones showing a phalangeal formula of 2-3-2. The hind limbs have a robust and bowed femur, a tibia which is slightly longer than the femur, and a slender fibula. They also preserve four metatarsals (metatarsal V is not preserved) where metatarsals II-IV, are not fused to each other and where metatarsal III is the longest and widest, while the others are equal in length

Feathers are preserved in the holotype and one of the two most recent finds, where they are associated with the neck, wing and tail regions.

== Relationships ==
Phylogenetic analysis conducted by Zhou & Zhang indicated that Archaeorhynchus was most closely related to ornithurines. This is based on the fact that the Archaeorhynchus shared advanced features with other ornithurines such as a U-shaped wishbone, a "keel" for flight muscle attachments along the full length of the breastbone, and a compressed and expanded first finger bone of the major manual digit. Nonetheless, Archaeorhynchus also retained primitive features including the lower jaw not being strongly forked at the back, and deep posterior notches in the sternum. The holotype specimen also showed features which suggest powerful flight capability similar to modern birds.

== Diet ==
Scientists have hypothesized that the Archaeorhynchus had an herbivorous diet, due to the large numbers of gastroliths (stomach stones) found in the gut of all known specimens. High numbers of these gastroliths suggest that they were not swallowed accidentally. These stones would have been eaten to help break down food that the animal would not have been able to chew because it was toothless.

== Life cycle ==
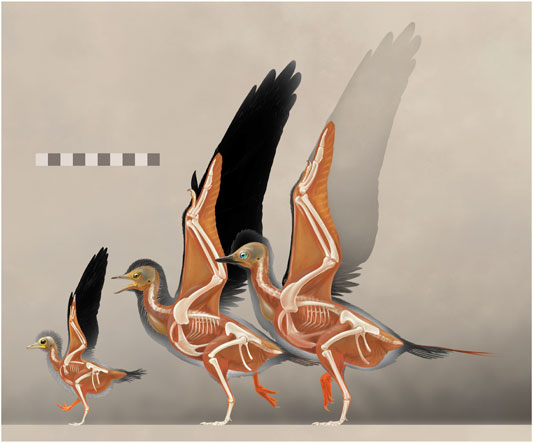
Life restoration of growth stages

A 2021 study on a juvenile specimen shows that, much like Enantiornithes and megapodes, Archaeorhynchus probably demonstrated flight soon after birth.
