= Schizooura =

Schizooura Temporal range: Early Cretaceous, 120 Ma

Scientific classification
- Kingdom: Animalia
- Phylum: Chordata
- Class: Reptilia
- Clade: Dinosauria
- Clade: Saurischia
- Clade: Theropoda
- Clade: Avialae
- Family: †Schizoouridae
- Genus: †Schizooura; Zhou, Zhou & O’Connor, 2012
- Species: †S. lii

Binomial name
- †Schizooura lii Zhou, Zhou & O’Connor, 2012

Extinct genus of dinosaurs related to modern birds

Schizooura is a genus under the classification of basal ornithuromorph dinosaurs, which are dinosaurs that are relatives of modern birds. This feathery creature was from the Early Cretaceous period (125.5 million years ago) in modern-day western Liaoning, China The Schizooura was a ground forager, meaning it collected whatever it could find from the floor. The bird evolved differently compared to other modern birds, as its beak is toothless. The remains were discovered in Jiufotang Formation deposits. Any information about the bird is relatively unknown, as only one fossil was ever discovered.
