= Archaeoraptor =

Faked dinosaur discovery in China

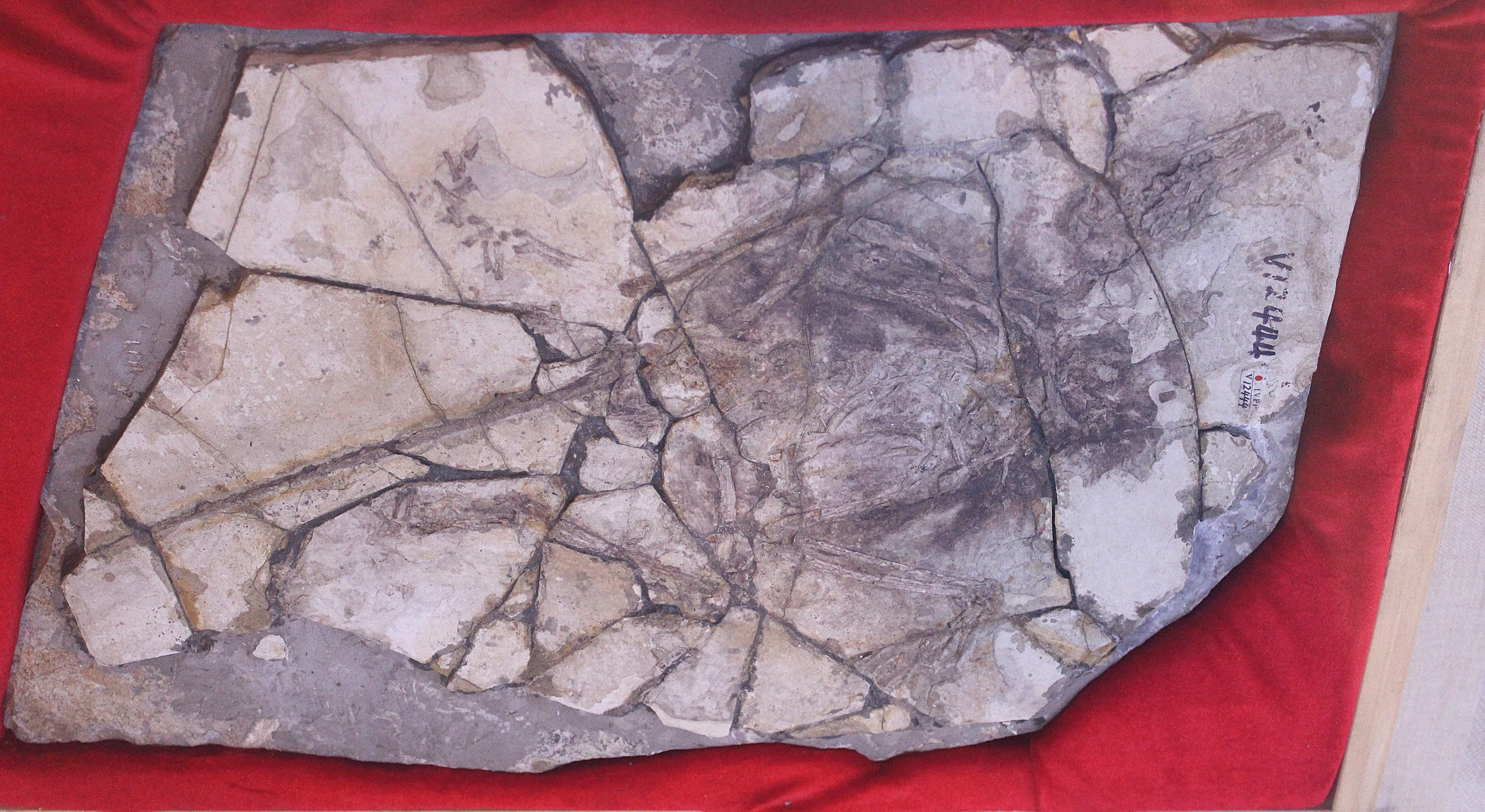
The "Archaeoraptor" fossil in the Paleozoological Museum of China

"Archaeoraptor" is the informal generic name for a fossil chimera from China in an article published in National Geographic magazine in 1999. The magazine claimed that the fossil was a "missing link" between birds and terrestrial theropod dinosaurs. Even before this publication, there had been severe doubts about the fossil's authenticity. Further scientific study showed it to be a forgery constructed from rearranged pieces of real fossils from different species. The tail is part of the holotype of Microraptor zhaoianus, a small winged dromaeosaur named in 2000. Zhou et al. (2002) found that the head and upper body belong to a specimen of the primitive fossil bird Yanornis. The legs and feet belong to an as yet unknown animal.

The scandal brought attention to illegal fossil deals conducted in China. Although "Archaeoraptor" was a forgery, many true examples of feathered dinosaurs have been found and demonstrate the evolutionary connection between birds and other theropods.

== Scandal ==
=== Background ===
This article from the November 1999 issue of National Geographic was retracted after the fossil "Archaeoraptor liaoningensis" was shown to be fraudulent.

According to National Geographic's report, the story of "Archaeoraptor" began in July 1997 in Xiasanjiazi, China, where farmers illegally but routinely dug in the shale pits and sold fossils to dealers for a few dollars. One farmer found a rare fossil of a toothed bird, complete with feather impressions. Nearby, he found a feathered tail and legs. He cemented several of these pieces together to make a more complete-looking fossil. It was sold in June 1998 and smuggled to the United States.

By the fall 1998 annual meeting of the Society of Vertebrate Paleontology in Utah, there were rumors of a primitive bird fossil in private hands. The fossil was presented at a gem show in Tucson, Arizona. The Dinosaur Museum, run by dinosaur enthusiast Stephen A. Czerkas and his wife, Sylvia Czerkas, purchased it in February 1999.

=== Study ===
The Czerkases contacted paleontologist Phil Currie, who contacted the National Geographic Society. Currie agreed to study the fossil on the condition that it was eventually returned to China. The National Geographic Society intended to get the fossil formally published in the peer-reviewed science journal Nature, and follow up immediately with a press conference and an issue of National Geographic.

Slade and the Czerkases intended the fossil to be on display in the museum for five years. Sloan says that in the spring of 1999 Czerkas agreed to return the fossil to China immediately after publication. Currie contacted the Institute of Vertebrate Paleontology and Paleoanthropology in Beijing, and National Geographic flew the IVPP's Xu Xing to Utah to join the team.

Examining the fossil on March 6, 1999, Currie saw that the left and right feet mirrored each other perfectly; that the fossil had been completed by using both slab and counterslab; and that there was no connection between the tail and the body. On July 29, 1999, Timothy Rowe made CT scans of the fossil at the High-Resolution X-ray CT Facility of the University of Texas at Austin, determining that the tail and the lower legs were not part of the larger fossil. He informed the Czerkases on August 2 that the whole could be a fraud. In the first week of September, Currie's preparator, Kevin Aulenback, went to the museum to prepare the fossil for study. Aulenback concluded that the fossil was "a composite specimen of at least 3 specimens...with a maximum...of five...separate specimens", but the Czerkases angrily denied this. Currie did not inform National Geographic about the matter.

=== Publication ===
On August 13, 1999, the team submitted a manuscript titled "A New Toothed Bird With a Dromaeosaur-like Tail" under the names of Stephen Czerkas, Currie, Rowe, and Xu, to the journal Nature. The paper mentions in two places, and includes a figure illustrating the point, that one of the legs and the tail are counterparts that were composited into the main slab. On August 20 Nature rejected the paper, indicating that as National Geographic had refused to delay publication, there was too little time for peer review. The authors then submitted the paper to Science. Two reviewers informed Science that "the specimen was smuggled out of China and illegally purchased" and that the fossil had been "doctored" in China "to enhance its value." Science rejected the paper. According to Sloan, the Czerkases did not inform National Geographic about the two rejections.

National Geographic published without peer review. The fossil was unveiled in a press conference on October 15, 1999, and the November 1999 National Geographic edition contained an article by Christopher P. Sloan – a National Geographic art editor. Sloan described it as a missing link that helped elucidate the connection between dinosaurs and birds. The original fossil was put on display at the National Geographic Society in Washington, D.C., pending return to China. In the article Sloan used the name "Archaeoraptor liaoningensis" but with a disclaimer (so that it would not count as a nomenclatural act for the purposes of scientific classification,) expecting that Czerkas would go on to publish a peer-reviewed description.

=== Exposure ===
Seeing the November National Geographic, Storrs L. Olson, curator of birds in the National Museum of Natural History published an open letter on November 1, 1999, pointing out that "the specimen in question is known to have been illegally exported" and protesting the "prevailing dogma that birds evolved from dinosaurs." Olson complained that Sloan, a journalist, had usurped the process of scientific nomenclature by publishing a name first in the popular press.

In October 1999, after being informed by Currie of the problems and seeing the specimen for the first time, Xu noticed that the tail of "Archaeoraptor" strongly resembled an unnamed maniraptoran dinosaur that he was studying—later named Microraptor zhaoianus. He traveled to Liaoning Province and contacted fossil dealers. He found a good fossil of a tiny dromaeosaur, whose tail corresponded so exactly to the tail on the "Archaeoraptor" that it had to be the counterslab—it even had two matching yellow oxide stains. On December 20, 1999, Xu Xing informed the authors and Sloan by e-mail that the fossil was a fake.

On February 3, 2000, The National Geographic News stated in a press release that the "Archaeoraptor" fossil might be a composite and that an internal investigation had begun. In the March issue of National Geographic, Xu's letter ran in the Forum section of the magazine, and Bill Allen had Xu change the word "fake" to "composite". On April 4, 2000, Stephen Czerkas told a group of paleontologists in Washington that he and Sylvia had made "an idiot, bone-stupid mistake". Currie, Allen, and Sloan all expressed regret. Rowe claimed the affair as evidence that his scans were correct, and published a Brief Communication in Nature in 2001 describing his findings. In June 2000 the fossil was returned to China. In the October 2000 issue, National Geographic published the results of their investigation. In December 2000, Science reported "Archaeoraptor's demise".

== Taxonomic confusion ==
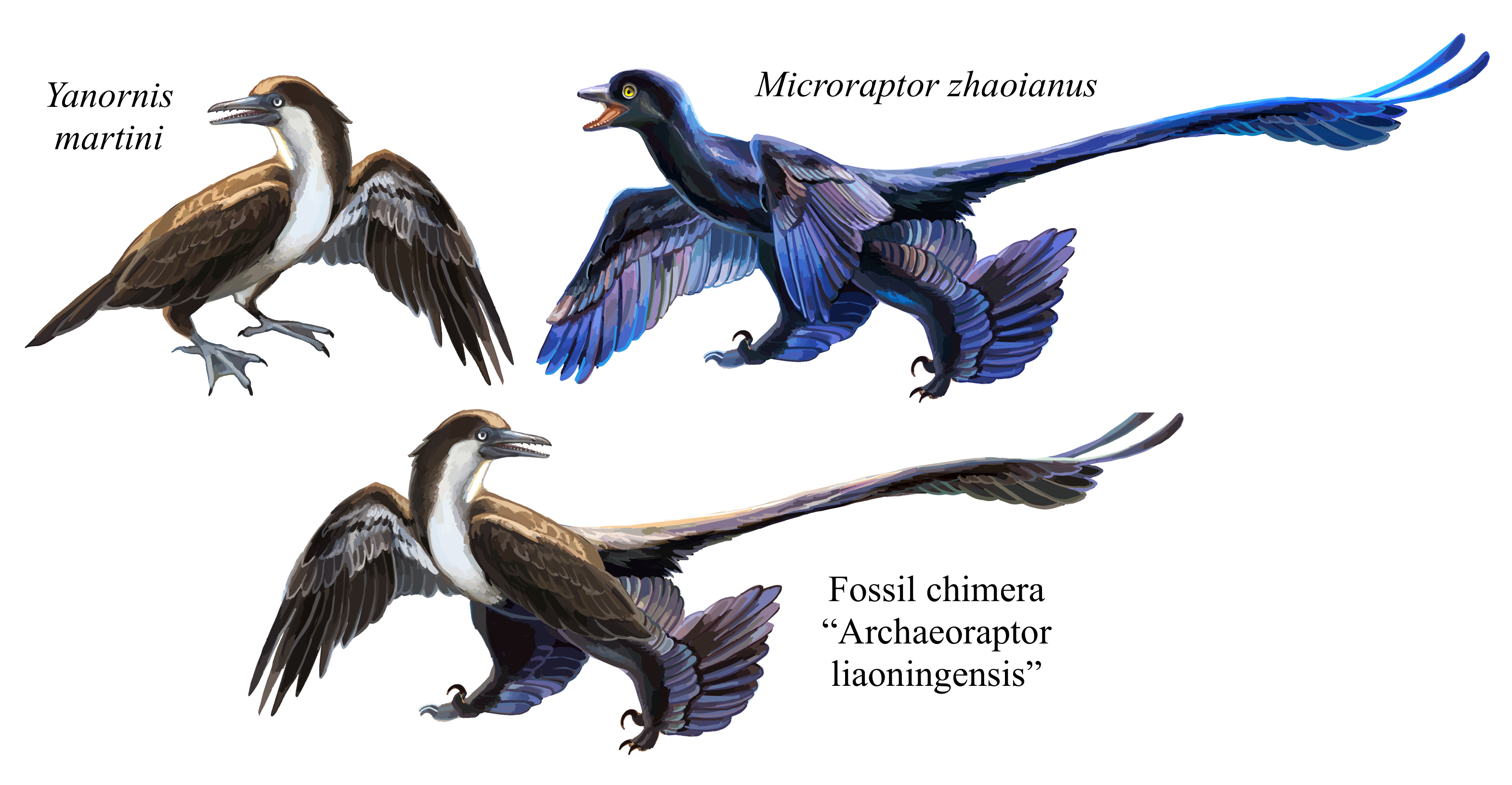
A hypothetical reconstruction of "Archaeoraptor" and its known constituents, Yanornis and Microraptor

The fossils involved in the "Archaeoraptor" scandal led to some confusion over taxon names. In December 2000, Microraptor was described in Nature. The upper body region of the "Archaeoraptor" fossil was named as a new taxon, Archaeovolans repatriatus by Czerkas & Xu in 2002. The same year, Zhou et al. examined the upper body of the "Archaeoraptor" fossil and reported that it belonged to the genus Yanornis, which had been named the year prior by Zhou and Zhang based on other fossils.

=== Dinosaur Museum Journal ===
In 2002 the Czerkases published a volume through their Dinosaur Museum titled Feathered Dinosaurs and the Origin of Flight, describing and naming several species.

Despite the work of Zhou et al. (2002), Czerkas and Xu Xing described the upper portion of the "Archaeoraptor" fossil as a new bird genus, Archaeovolans, in the Dinosaur Museum Journal. The article included the caveat that the fossil might actually be a specimen of Yanornis.

Across the monographs in the Dinosaur Museum Journal, Stephen Czerkas built a case for his view that maniraptoran dinosaurs were secondarily flightless birds. In so doing, he criticized prominent paleontologists. In the text on Cryptovolans, Czerkas accused Dr. Mark Norell of misinterpreting the fossil BPM 1 3-13 as having long leg feathers due to the "blinding influences of preconceived ideas." However, Norell's interpretation was correct, Czerkas adding leg feathers to his own reconstruction of the fossil in the artwork that promoted the traveling exhibit.

Two other taxa that Czerkas and his co-authors named were later treated as junior synonyms by other authors. Czerkas' Cryptovolans was treated as Microraptor, and his Scansoriopteryx was treated as Epidendrosaurus. Czerkas described Omnivoropteryx, noting that it was similar to Sapeornis. Later specimens of Sapeornis with skulls demonstrated that the two were probably synonymous.

Another taxon that Czerkas assigned to the Pterosauria and named Utahdactylus was reviewed by Chris Bennett. Bennett found multiple misidentifications of bones and inconsistencies between Czerkas' diagrams and the actual fossils. Bennett found the specimen to be an indeterminate diapsid, and criticized the previous authors for publishing a species name when no diagnostic characters below the class level could be verified. He made Utahdactylus a nomen dubium.

=== Traveling exhibit ===
In 2001 Stephen and Sylvia Czerkas compiled a traveling exhibit containing 34 other Chinese fossils. The show was titled Feathered Dinosaurs and the Origin of Flight. The San Diego Natural History Museum paid a set fee to the Dinosaur Museum to display this show in 2004. When the show opened, Dr. Ji Qiang told reporters from Nature that about a dozen of the fossils had left China illegally. Ji arranged with the Czerkases to assign accession numbers to three of the most valuable specimens, thus formally adding them to the collection of the Chinese Academy of Geological Sciences in Beijing, although they remain in the possession of the Czerkases. Stephen Czerkas denied Ji's assertion that the fossils were illegal. Sylvia Czerkas told the journal Nature that she had worked out an agreement with officials of Liaoning Province in 2001 to borrow the fossils and that they were to be repatriated in 2007. Through March 2009, however, the show was scheduled for the Fresno Metropolitan Museum of Art and Science in California. According to Nature, the Czerkases refused requests to make the officials from Liaoning available for an interview.

The "Archaeoraptor" fossil assemblage appeared in a 2017 exhibition in Wollaton Hall, near Nottingham, titled Dinosaurs of China: Ground Shakers to Feathered Flyers, where it was exhibited along with fossils of Yanoris and Microraptor, its main components.

=== Taxonomic history ===
In April 2000 Olson published an article in Backbone, the newsletter of the National Museum of Natural History. In this article, he justified his views on the evolution of birds, but revised and redescribed the species "Archaeoraptor liaoningensis" by designating just the tail of the original fraudulent specimen as the type specimen. To prevent the tainted name "Archaeoraptor" from entering paleornithological literature, this redescription assigned the name to that part of the chimeric specimen least likely to be classified under Aves, rather than to the portion which was later shown to represent a true bird species. Olson presumed that the National Geographic article had already validly named the fossil, and he, therefore, failed to explicitly indicate the name was new, as demanded by article 16 of the ICZN as a condition for a name to be valid. Several months afterward Xu, Zhou, and Wang published their description of Microraptor zhaoianus in Nature.
