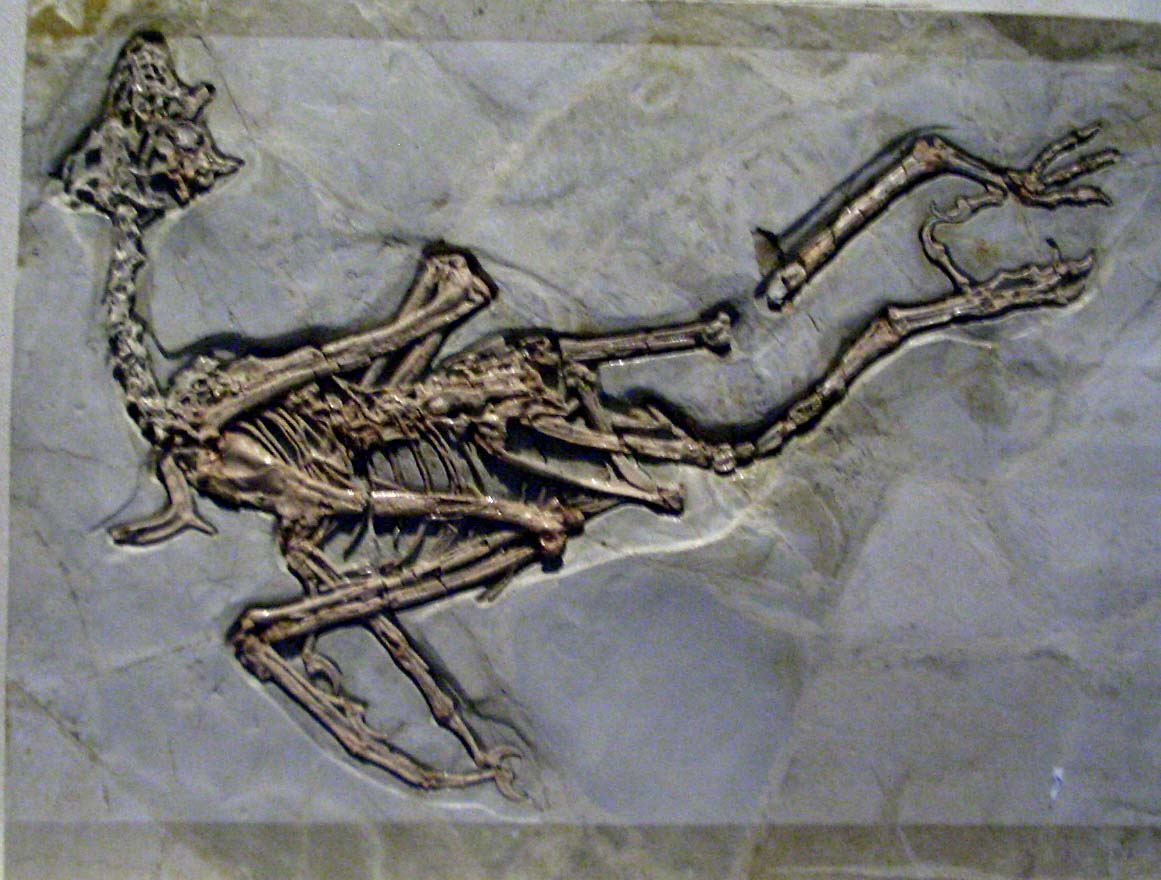
- Fossil specimen of Sapeornis chaoyangensis, Hong Kong Science Museum

Scientific classification
- Kingdom: Animalia
- Phylum: Chordata
- Class: Reptilia
- Clade: Dinosauria
- Clade: Saurischia
- Clade: Theropoda
- Clade: Avialae
- Clade: Avebrevicauda
- Order: †Omnivoropterygiformes
- Family: †Omnivoropterygidae; Czerkas & Ji, 2002

Type species
- †Omnivoropteryx sinousaorum Czerkas & Ji, 2002

Genera
- †Falcatakely?; †Omnivoropteryx; †Sapeornis; †Zhongornis?

Synonyms
- Sapeornithidae Zhou & Zhang, 2006

= Omnivoropterygidae =

Omnivoropterygids Temporal range: Early Cretaceous, 124.5–120 Ma (possible Late Cretaceous record)

Extinct family of dinosaurs

Omnivoropterygidae (meaning "omnivorous wings") is a family of primitive avialan dinosaurs known exclusively from the Jiufotang Formation of China, though putative omnivoropterygids are known from the Maevarano Formation of the Maastrichtian of Madagascar. They had short skeletal tails and unusual skulls with teeth in the upper, but not lower, jaws. Their unique dentition has led some scientists to suggest an omnivorous diet for them. The family was named by Stephen A. Czerkas & Qiang Ji in 2002, though its junior synonym Sapeornithidae is often used instead, though it was named four years later in 2006. It is the only named family in the order Omnivoropterygiformes.
