= Dinosaurs of China (exhibition) =

Former natural science exhibit in England

Dinosaurs of China was a dinosaur exhibition hosted in Wollaton Hall, near Nottingham. The exhibition included thirty varieties of Chinese dinosaurs and ran from Saturday 1 July to Sunday 29 October 2017. The exhibition, a world-exclusive event, claimed to include specimens from all other China, as well as the world-famous fake dinosaur Archaeoraptor.

== Exhibits and theme ==
The admission booth of Dinosaurs of China contained a Psittacosaurus sculpted by Robert Nicholls. Entering the main hall ("Earth Shakers"), a replica Protoceratops was displayed to the left, and slightly further along on the same wall, a juvenile Pinacosaurus. To the right was a replica skeleton of Mamenchisaurus, positioned centrally in the main hall, and claimed in-exhibit to be the tallest ever exhibited dinosaur replica in Britain. Slightly beyond that was a replica Sinraptor, posed in a defensive position. The last fossil on the first floor (in the main hall, at least) was a Lufengosaurus. The exhibition then continued through the building's avian taxidermy hall, noting various similarities between non-avian dinosaurs and birds. This section contained a tiny fossil of the troodontid Mei long, and a larger fossil of Oviraptor.

The main hall of the second floor ("Feathered Flyers") was dominated by a replica skeleton of the oviraptorosaur Gigantoraptor. Other fossils of the smaller coelurosaurs Linheraptor, Sinosauropteryx, Dilong, Epidexipteryx, Caudipteryx, Yanornis and Microraptor were also displayed. Moving through the hallway to the next room, another view of the Mamenchisaurus could be seen, and the fossils of Protopteryx, Confuciusornis, Yi qi and Wukongopterus were displayed. There was another taxidermy hall, this time focusing on the conservation of modern endangered mammals. The exhibition then looped back downstairs, made a final pass of the Lufengosaurus, before returning to the admission booth.

== Extension ==
The exhibition had a small section in Nottingham Lakeside Arts about how dinosaurs were drawn through the ages, showing how the illustrations changed with discoveries. It included some answers to the children's trail and a skeleton of the dinosaur Sinosaurus. Several references, including a sign next to the skeleton, were made to the Jurassic Park film series.
