= Omnivoropteryx =

Omnivoropteryx Temporal range: Early Cretaceous, 120 Ma

Scientific classification
- Kingdom: Animalia
- Phylum: Chordata
- Class: Reptilia
- Clade: Dinosauria
- Clade: Saurischia
- Clade: Theropoda
- Clade: Avialae
- Order: †Omnivoropterygiformes
- Family: †Omnivoropterygidae
- Genus: †Omnivoropteryx; Czerkas & Ji, 2002
- Species: †O. sinousaorum

Binomial name
- †Omnivoropteryx sinousaorum Czerkas & Ji, 2002

Extinct genus of dinosaurs

Omnivoropteryx (meaning "omnivorous wing") is a genus of primitive flying avialan from the early Cretaceous Upper Jiufotang Formation of China. The authors who described Omnivoropteryx, Stephen Czerkas and Qiang Ji, stated that their specimen closely resembles Sapeornis, but the pubis was longer and, since no skull was known for Sapeornis, they did not consider the two names synonyms. The later discovery of Sapeornis skulls shows that they were indeed similar to Omnivoropteryx. This may make Omnivoropteryx a junior synonym of Sapeornis, and the name may be abandoned.

== Classification ==
Czerkas and Ji created the family Omnivoropterygidae to contain the genus Omnivoropteryx, as well as the order Omnivoropterygiformes, though some scientists do not recognize taxa that contain only one genus. Paul Sereno, for example, considered the family Omnivoropterygidae to be invalid because it is redundant and was not given a phylogenetic definition.

The single species O. sinousaorum shows an interesting mix of specialized and generalized characters: the legs were short and well suited for perching on branches, while the wings were long, suggesting it did not need a running or jumping takeoff to get into the air. Its skull, on the other hand, was similar to some early oviraptorosaurs, having the structure of a beak designed for crushing and tearing with some teeth at the tip of the upper jaw. Thus, the species may have been an opportunistic omnivore (as the name suggests), utilizing a wide range of food sources, unlike other early birds which were active predators of smaller animals.
