= Ursula Bettina Göhlich =

Ursula B. Göhlich
- Born: 1967 (age 58–59)
- Education: LMU Munich
- Known for: Research on fossil mammals, birds, and dinosaurs; co-description of Juravenator starki
- Awards: Humboldt Fellowship
- Scientific career
- Fields: Vertebrate paleontology
- Workplaces: Natural History Museum, Vienna
- Thesis: Elephantoidea (Proboscidea, Mammalia) aus dem Mittel- und Obermiozän der Oberen Süßwassermolasse Süddeutschlands: Odontologie und Osteologie (1997)
- Doctoral advisor: Volker Fahlbusch

Ursula Bettina Göhlich (born 1967) is a German vertebrate paleontologist specializing in fossil mammals, dinosaurs, and birds.

== Career ==
Göhlich studied geology at LMU Munich, where she obtained her diploma in 1992 and completed her doctorate in 1997 under Volker Fahlbusch on Paleogene elephants from the freshwater molasse of Bavaria.

From 1997 to 1998 she worked at the former Geological Survey of Bavaria (now the Bavarian Environment Agency) and returned to LMU Munich in 1999 as a lecturer at the Institute of Paleontology. Between 2002 and 2005 she was a postdoctoral researcher at the University of Lyon with Cécile Mourer-Chauviré (as an Alexander von Humboldt Fellow) and in 2003 at the Natural History Museum of Los Angeles County with Luis M. Chiappe, participating in excavations of Tyrannosaurus and Triceratops in the United States. Since 2007 she has been curator of vertebrate paleontology at the Natural History Museum, Vienna. She completed her habilitation in Munich in 2011.

She is an associate member of the GeoBio-Center at LMU Munich and serves on the advisory board of the Palaeontological Society. From 2008 to 2012 she was on the council of the Society of Avian Paleontology and Evolution (SAPE).

== Research ==
Göhlich has studied fossil proboscideans such as Gomphotherium (from Gweng near Mühldorf and Sandelzhausen in Bavaria), Deinotherium and Archaeobelodon, and has also researched rhinoceros relatives from the Miocene of Sandelzhausen.

Together with Luis M. Chiappe, she co-described the small theropod dinosaur Juravenator starki from the Jurassic of Solnhofen, discovered in 1998 and named after the quarry owners. The fossil was named “Borsti” and received attention as the 2009 “Fossil of the Year.” Preparation by Pino Völkl at the Juramuseum Eichstätt revealed preserved skin surfaces with scales instead of feathers, though ultraviolet photography by Helmut Tischlinger later showed filament-like structures possibly representing primitive feathers. Xu Xing suggested that Juravenator shows early stages of feather evolution.

With Cécile Mourer-Chauviré, Göhlich has studied pheasant-like birds from the Miocene of Saint-Gérand-le-Puy (Allier, France) and Miocene birds from Gratkorn in Styria and Sandelzhausen, including a crane (Palaeogrus mainburgensis). She also worked on cataloguing the fossil bird collection of the Bavarian State Collection for Paleontology and Geology in Munich, and with Gerald Mayr described a Miocene parrot from the Nördlinger Ries basin, Bavaripsitta ballmanni.

Since 2012, she has participated in excavations for fossil mammals in the Gobi Desert. Since 2013, she has been a member of the scientific advisory board of the Messel Pit.

== Selected publications ==
- Tertiary elephants from Germany. In: Harald Meller (ed.): Elefantenreich – Eine Fossilwelt in Europa. Halle (Saale), 2010, pp. 340–372.
