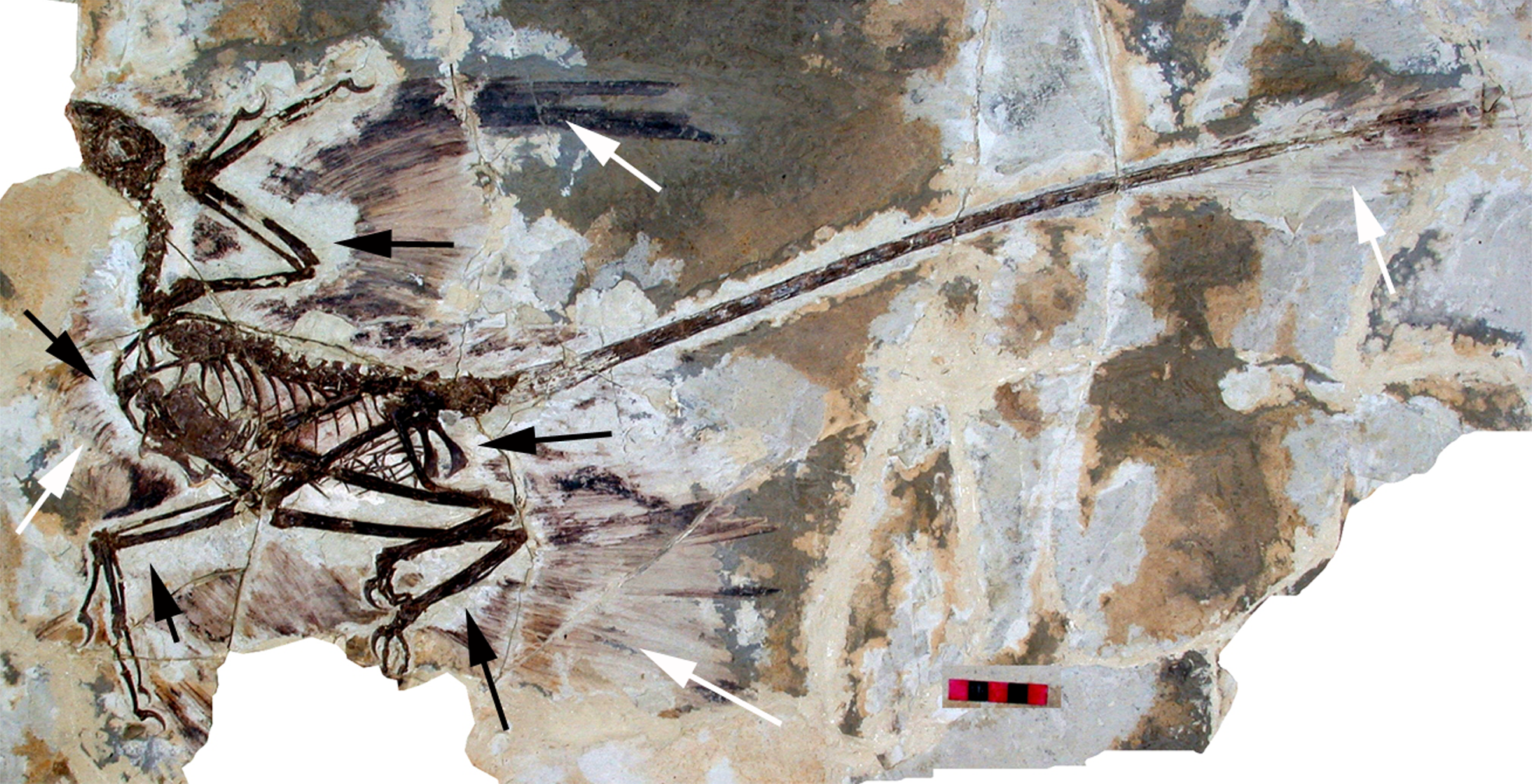
- Holotype specimen IVPP V 13352, with white arrows pointing at preserved feathers

Scientific classification
- Kingdom: Animalia
- Phylum: Chordata
- Class: Reptilia
- Clade: Dinosauria
- Clade: Saurischia
- Clade: Theropoda
- Family: †Dromaeosauridae
- Clade: †Microraptoria
- Genus: †Microraptor; Xu et al., 2000

Type species
- †Microraptor zhaoianus Xu et al., 2000

Other species
- †M. gui Xu et al., 2003; †M. hanqingi Gong et al., 2012

Synonyms
- Cryptovolans pauli Czerkas et al., 2002; "Tetrapterornis" Miller, 2004 (nomen nudum)

= Microraptor =

Microraptor Temporal range: Early Cretaceous, 120 Ma

Extinct genus of dinosaurs

Microraptor (Greek, μικρός, mīkros: "small"; Latin, raptor: "one who seizes") is a genus of small, four-winged dromaeosaurid dinosaurs. Numerous well-preserved fossil specimens have been recovered from Liaoning, China. They date from the early Cretaceous Jiufotang Formation (Aptian stage), 125 to 120 million years ago. Three species have been named (M. zhaoianus, M. gui, and M. hanqingi), though further study has suggested that all of them represent variation in a single species, which is properly called M. zhaoianus. Cryptovolans, initially described as another four-winged dinosaur, is usually considered to be a synonym of Microraptor.

Like Archaeopteryx, well-preserved fossils of Microraptor provide important evidence about the evolutionary relationship between birds and earlier dinosaurs. Microraptor had long pennaceous feathers that formed aerodynamic surfaces on the arms and tail but also on the legs. This led paleontologist Xu Xing in 2003 to describe the first specimen to preserve this feature as a "four-winged dinosaur" and to speculate that it may have glided using all four limbs for lift. Subsequent studies have suggested that Microraptor was capable of powered flight as well.

Microraptor was among the most abundant non-avialan dinosaurs in its ecosystem, and the genus is represented by more fossils than any other dromaeosaurid, with possibly over 300 fossil specimens represented across various museum collections. One specimen in particular shows evidence of active primary sequential moulting similar to that of modern volant (flight-capable) birds, which is one of the few known fossil evidence of such behavior among pennaraptoran dinosaurs.

== History ==
=== Naming controversy ===
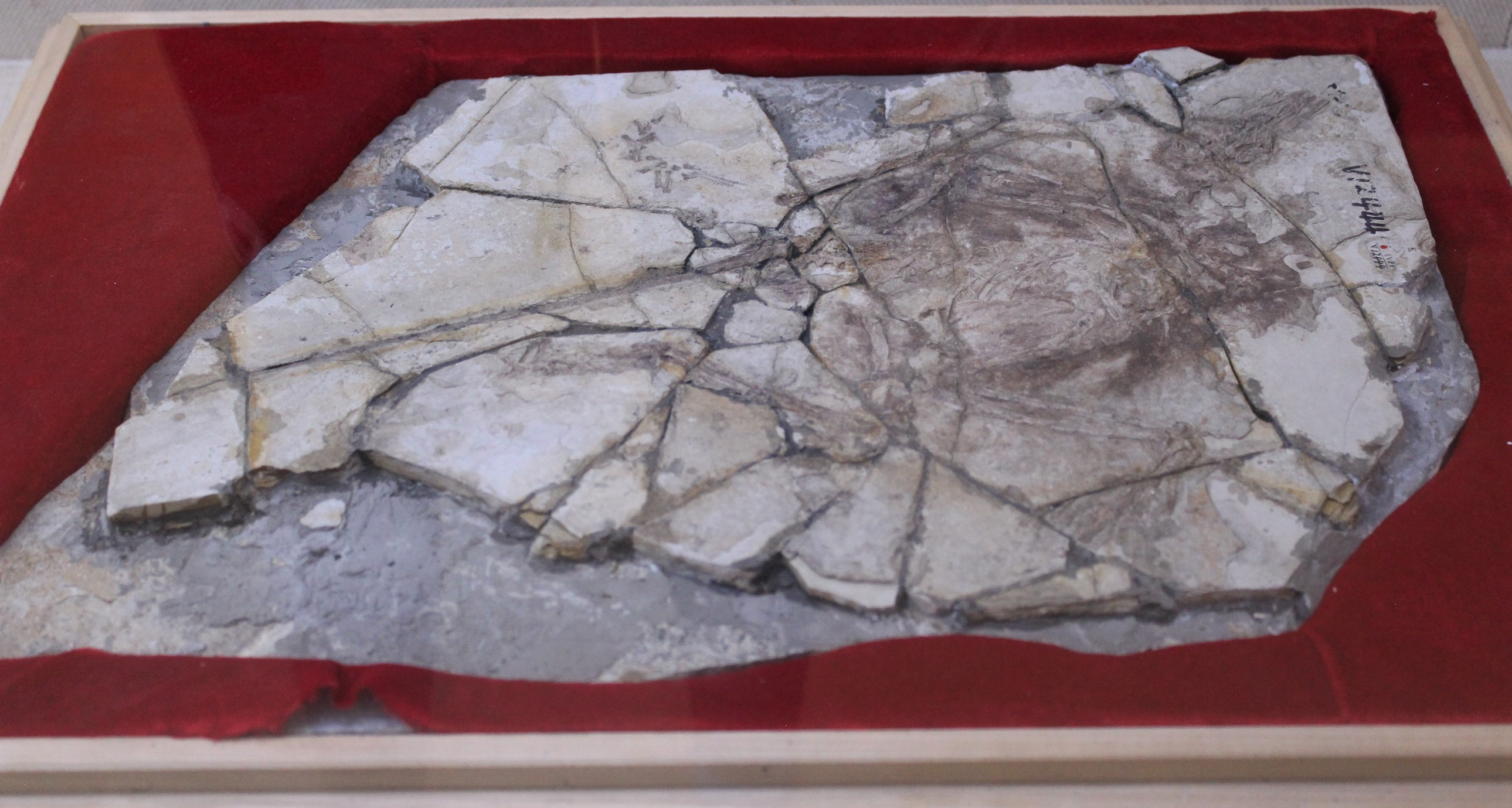
The "Archaeoraptor" fossil; the tail belongs to Microraptor

The initial naming of Microraptor was controversial, because of the unusual circumstances of its first description. The first specimen to be described was part of a chimeric specimen—a patchwork of different feathered dinosaur species (Microraptor itself, Yanornis and an as-of-yet undescribed third species) assembled from multiple specimens in China and smuggled to the USA for sale. After the forgery was revealed by Xu Xing of Beijing's Institute of Vertebrate Paleontology and Paleoanthropology, Storrs L. Olson, curator of birds in the National Museum of Natural History of the Smithsonian Institution, published a description of the Microraptor's tail in an obscure journal, giving it the name Archaeoraptor liaoningensis in an attempt to remove the name from the paleornithological record by assigning it to the part least likely to be a bird. However, Xu had discovered the remains of the specimen from which the tail had been taken and published a description of it later that year, giving it the name Microraptor zhaoianus.

Since the two names designate the same individual as the type specimen, Microraptor zhaoianus would have been a junior objective synonym of Archaeoraptor liaoningensis and the latter, if valid, would have had priority under the International Code of Zoological Nomenclature. However, there is some doubt whether Olson in fact succeeded in meeting all the formal requirements for establishing a new taxon. Notably, Olson designated the specimen as a lectotype, before an actual type species was formally erected. A similar situation arose with Tyrannosaurus rex and Manospondylus gigas, in which the former became a nomen protectum (protected name) and the latter a nomen oblitum (disused name) due to revisions in the ICZN rules that took place on 31 December 1999. In addition, Xu's name for the type specimen (Microraptor) was subsequently used more frequently than the original name; as such, this and the chimeric nature of the specimen would render the name "Archaeoraptor" a nomen vanum (as it was improperly described) and the junior synonym Microraptor a nomen protectum (as it has been used in more published works than "Archaeoraptor" and was properly described).

=== Additional specimens ===
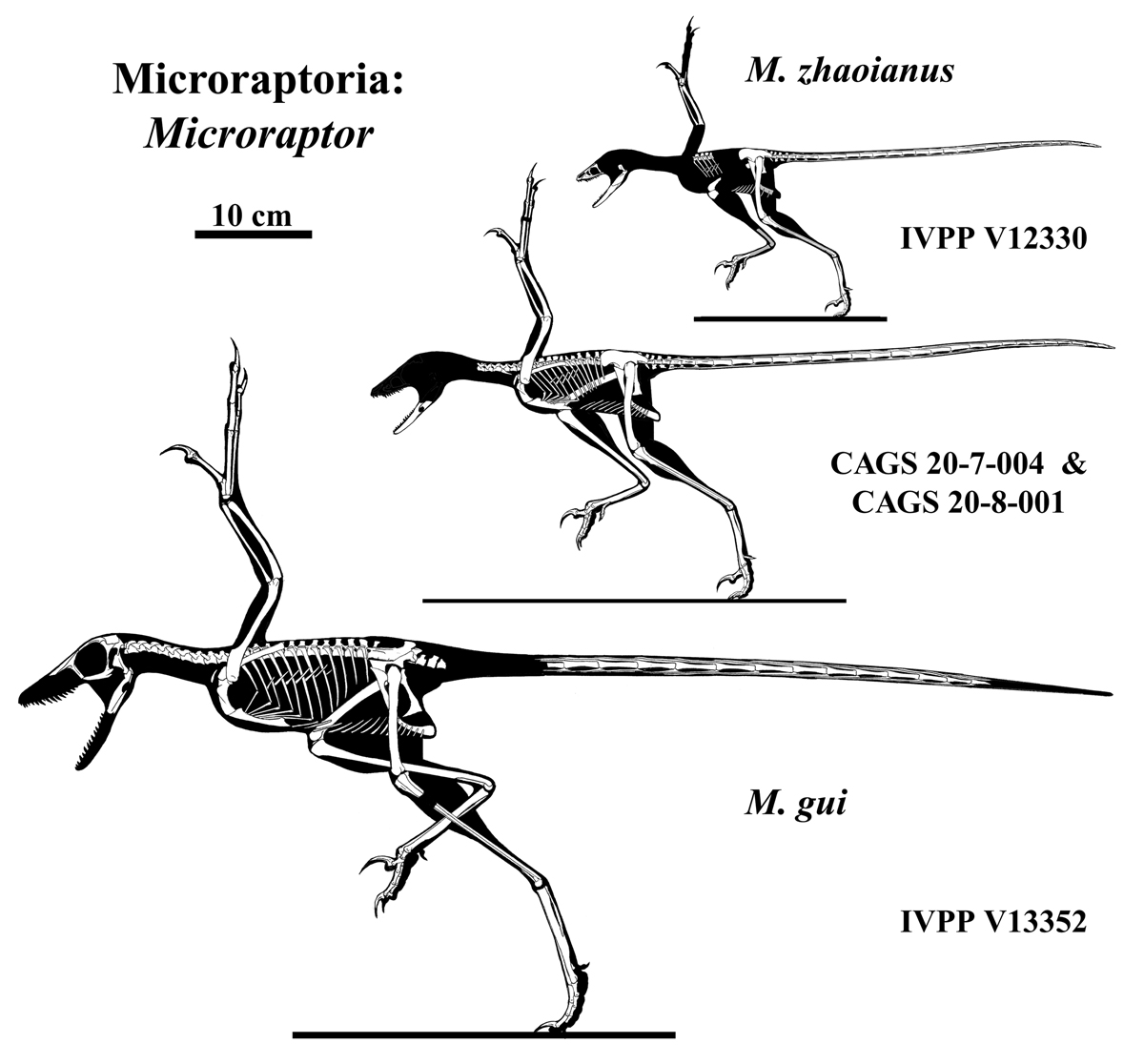
Skeletal restorations of various specimens

The first specimen referred to Microraptor represented a small individual and included faint feather remnants, but was otherwise not well preserved and lacked a skull. In 2002 Mark Norell et al. described another specimen, BPM 1 3-13, which they did not name or refer to an existing species. Later that year Stephen Czerkas et al. named the specimen Cryptovolans pauli, and referred two additional specimens (the first to show well-preserved feathers) to this species. The generic name was derived from Greek kryptos, "hidden", and Latin volans, "flying". The specific name, pauli, honors paleontologist Gregory S. Paul, who had long proposed that dromaeosaurids evolved from flying ancestors.

The type specimens of C. pauli were collected from the Jiufotang Formation, dating from the early Albian and now belong to the collection of the Paleontology Museum of Beipiao, in Liaoning, China. They are referred to by the inventory numbers LPM 0200, the holotype; LPM 0201, its counterslab (slab and counterslab together represent the earlier BPM 1 3-13); and the paratype LPM 0159, a smaller skeleton. Both individuals are preserved as articulated compression fossils; they are reasonably complete but partially damaged.

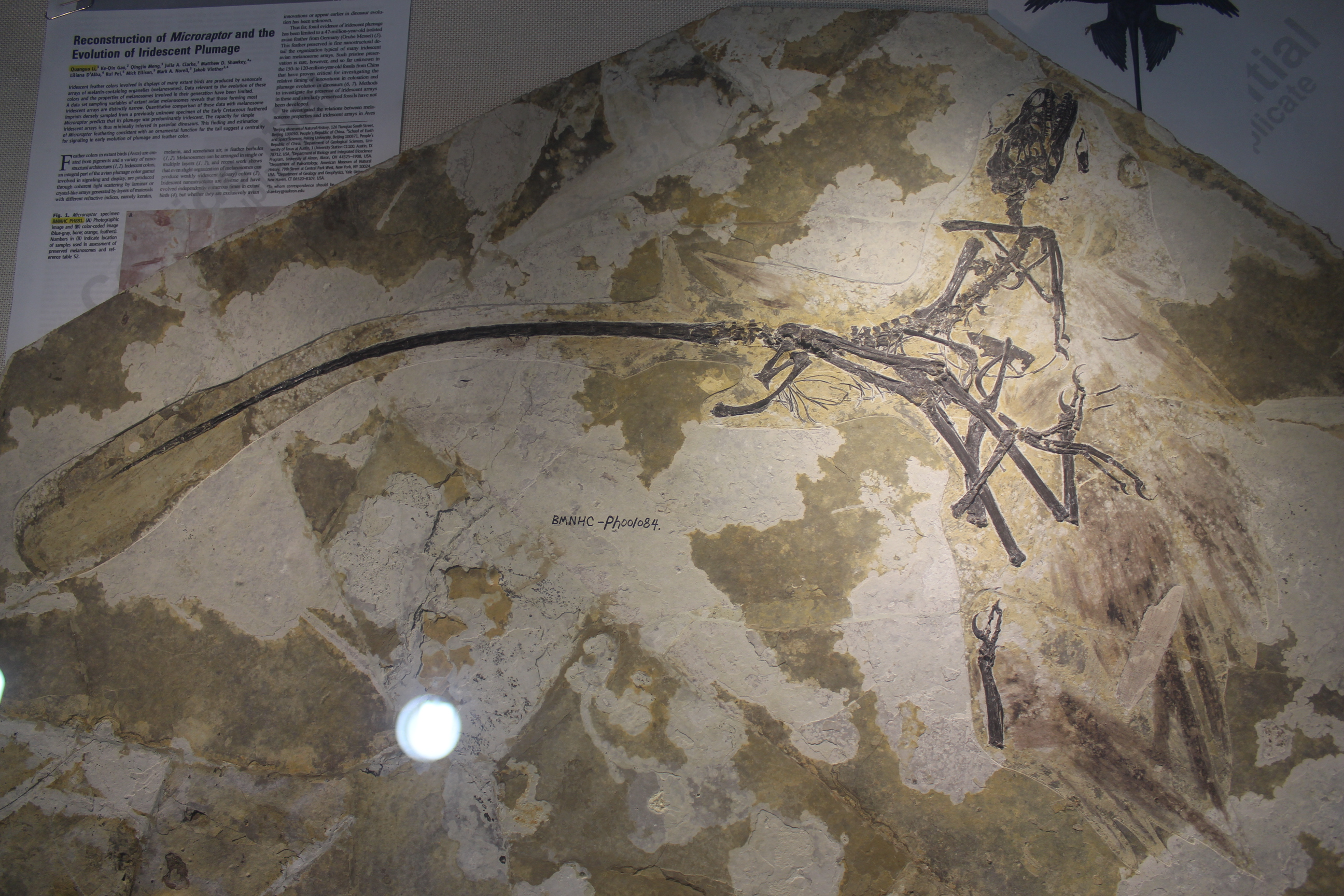
Specimen at the Beijing Museum of Natural History

Czerkas et al. (2002) diagnosed the genus on the basis of having primary feathers (which in the authors' opinion made it a bird), a co-ossified sternum, a tail consisting of 28 to 30 vertebrae and a third finger with a short phalanx III-3. Some of the feathers Czerkas described as primary were actually attached to the leg, rather than the arm. This, along with most of the other diagnostic characters, is also present in the genus Microraptor, which was first described earlier than Cryptovolans. However, BPM 1 3-13 has a longer tail, proportionately, than other Microraptor specimens that had been described by 2002, which have 24 to 26 tail vertebrae.

Subsequent studies (and more specimens of Microraptor) have shown that the features used to distinguish Cryptovolans are not unique, but are present to varying degrees across various specimens. In a review by Phil Senter and colleagues in 2004, the scientists suggested that all these features represented individual variation across various age groups of a single Microraptor species, making the name Cryptovolans pauli and Microraptor gui junior synonyms of Microraptor zhaoianus. Many other researchers, including Alan Feduccia and Tom Holtz, have since supported its synonymy. M. gui has been accepted as a distinct species with the specimen reported in 2013 being distinguishable from the type specimen of M. zhaoianus.

A new specimen of Microraptor, BMNHC PH881, showed several features previously unknown in the animal, including the probably glossy-black iridescent plumage coloration. The new specimen also featured a bifurcated tailfan, similar in shape to previously known Microraptor tailfans except sporting a pair of long, narrow feathers at the center of the fan. The new specimen also showed no sign of the nuchal crest, indicating that the crest inferred from the holotype specimen may be an artifact of taphonomic distortion.

Numerous further specimens likely belonging to Microraptor have been uncovered, all from the Shangheshou Bed of the Jiufotang Formation in Liaoning, China. In fact, Microraptor is the most abundant non-avialan dinosaur fossil type found in this formation. In 2010, it was reported that there were over 300 undescribed specimens attributable to Microraptor or its close relatives among the collections of several Chinese museums, though many had been altered or composited by private fossil collectors.

=== Study and debate ===
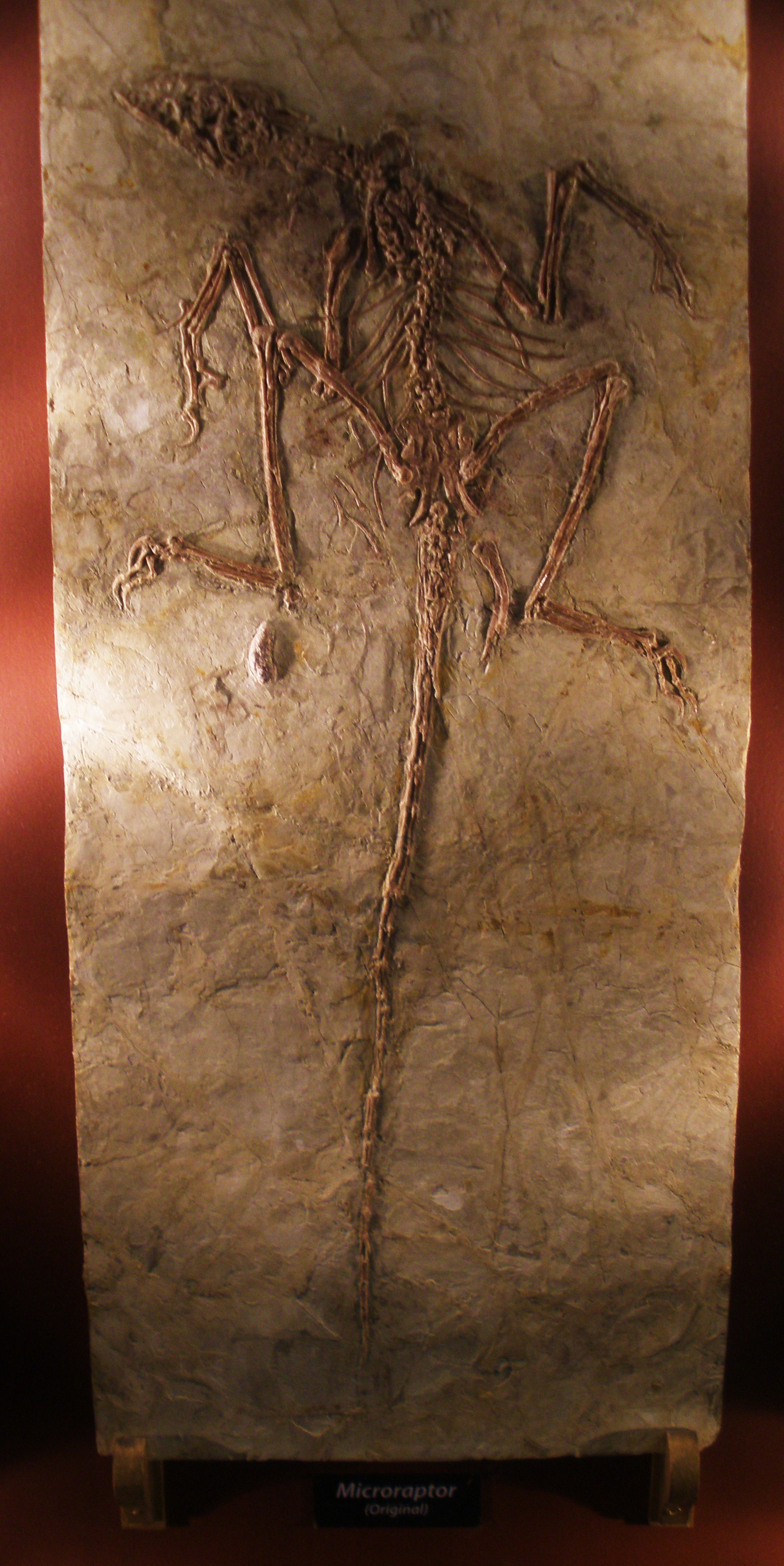
Fossil specimen

Norell et al. (2002) described BPM 1 3-13 as the first dinosaur known to have flight feathers on its legs as well as on its arms.

Czerkas (2002) mistakenly described the fossil as having no long feathers on its legs, but only on its hands and arms, as he illustrated on the cover of his book Feathered Dinosaurs and the Origin of Flight. In his discussion of Cryptovolans in this book, Czerkas strongly denounces Norell's conclusions; "The misinterpretation of the primary wing feathers as being from the hind legs stems directly to [sic] seeing what one believes and wants to see". Czerkas also denounced Norell for failing to conclude that dromaeosaurs are birds, accusing him of succumbing to "...the blinding influences of preconceived ideas". The crown group definition of Aves, as a subset of Avialae, the explicit definition of the term "bird" that Norell employs, would definitely exclude BPM 1 3-13. However, he does not consider the specimen to belong to Avialae either.

Czerkas's interpretation of the hindleg feathers noted by Norell proved to be incorrect the following year when additional specimens of Microraptor were published by Xu and colleagues, showing a distinctive "hindwing" completely separate from the forelimb wing. The first of these specimens was discovered in 2001, and between 2001 and 2003 four more specimens were bought from private collectors by Xu's museum, the Institute of Vertebrate Paleontology and Paleoanthropology. Xu also considered these specimens, most of which had hindwings and proportional differences from the original Microraptor specimen, to be a new species, which he named Microraptor gui. However, Senter also questioned this classification, noting that as with Cryptovolans, most of the differences appeared to correspond with size, and likely age differences. Two further specimens, classified as M. zhaoianus in 2002 (M. gui had not yet been named), have also been described by Hwang and colleagues.

Czerkas also believed that the animal may have been able to fly better than Archaeopteryx, the animal usually referred to as the earliest known bird. He cited the fused sternum and asymmetrical feathers, and argued that Microraptor has modern bird features that make it more derived than Archaeopteryx. Czerkas cited the fact that this possibly volant animal is also very clearly a dromaeosaurid to suggest that the Dromaeosauridae might actually be a basal bird group, and that later, larger, species such as Deinonychus were secondarily flightless (Czerkas, 2002). The current consensus is that there is not enough evidence to conclude whether dromaeosaurs descended from an ancestor with some aerodynamic abilities. The work of Xu et al. (2003) suggested that basal dromaeosaurs were probably small, arboreal, and could glide. The work of Turner et al. (2007) suggested that the ancestral dromaeosaur could not glide or fly, but that there was good evidence that it was small-bodied (around 65 cm long and 600–700 g in mass).

== Description ==
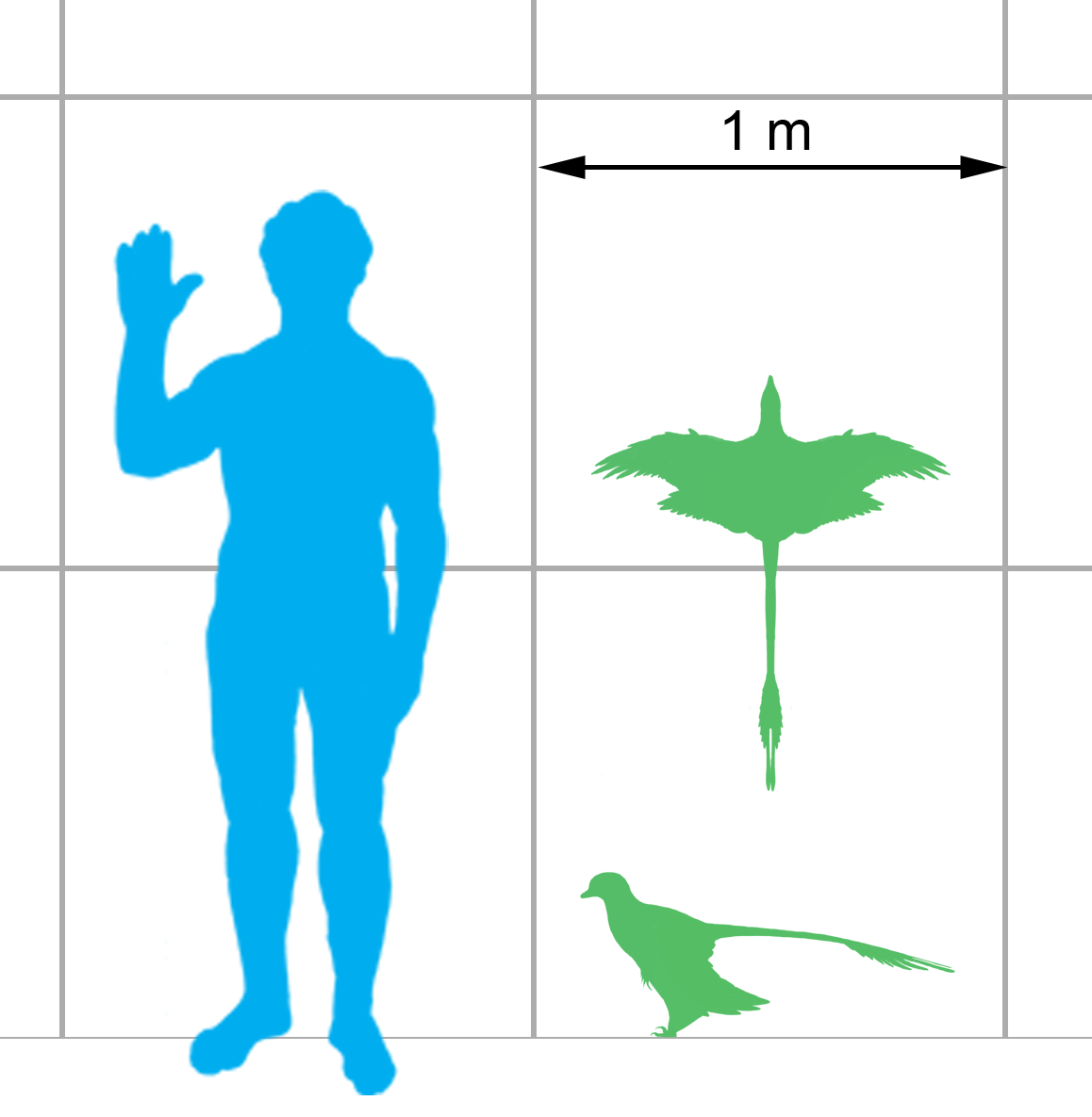
Wingspan and body size compared with a human

Microraptor was among the smallest-known non-avian dinosaurs, with the holotype of M. gui measuring 77 centimetres (2.53 ft) in length, 88–94 centimetres (2.89–3.08 ft) in wingspan and weighing 0.5–1.4 kilograms (1.1–3.1 lb). There are larger specimens which would have measured at least 80 centimetres (2.6 ft) in length, more than 99 centimetres (3.25 ft) in wingspan and weighed 1.25–1.88 kilograms (2.8–4.1 lb). (Note: The wingspan estimate is based on the equation presented in the study by Dececchi et al. (2016) which states that the wingspan of the paravians in the study would have been 2.1 times the wing length. In case of Microraptor, the holotype had a wing length of 42 centimetres (1.38 ft), resulting in a wingspan of more than 88 centimetres (2.89 ft). The larger specimen QV1002 measured 3 centimetres (1.2 in) longer than the holotype in precaudal length, and had wing length of 47.2 centimetres (1.55 ft), resulting in a wingspan of more than 99 centimetres (3.25 ft).) Aside from their extremely small size, Microraptor were among the first non-avialan dinosaurs discovered with the impressions of feathers and wings. Seven specimens of M. zhaoianus have been described in detail, from which most feather impressions are known. Unusual even among early birds and feathered dinosaurs, Microraptor is one of the few known bird precursors to sport long flight feathers on the legs as well as the wings. Their bodies had a thick covering of feathers, with a diamond-shaped fan on the end of the tail (possibly for added stability during flight). Xu et al. (2003) compared the longer plumes on Microraptor's head to those of the Philippine eagle. Bands of dark and light present on some specimens may indicate color patterns present in life, though at least some individuals almost certainly possessed an iridescent black coloration.

=== Distinguishing anatomical features ===
A diagnosis is a statement of the anatomical features of an organism (or group) that collectively distinguish it from all other organisms. Some, but not all, of the features in a diagnosis are also autapomorphies. An autapomorphy is a distinctive anatomical feature that is unique to a given organism. Several anatomical features found in Microraptor, such as a combination of unserrated and partially serrated teeth with constricted 'waists', and unusually long upper arm bones, are shared with both primitive avians and primitive troodontids. Microraptor is particularly similar to the basal troodontid Sinovenator; in their 2002 description of two M. zhaoianus specimens, Hwang et al. note that this is not particularly surprising, given that both Microraptor and Sinovenator are very primitive members of two closely related groups, and both are close to the deinonychosaurian split between dromaeosaurids and troodontids.

=== Coloration ===
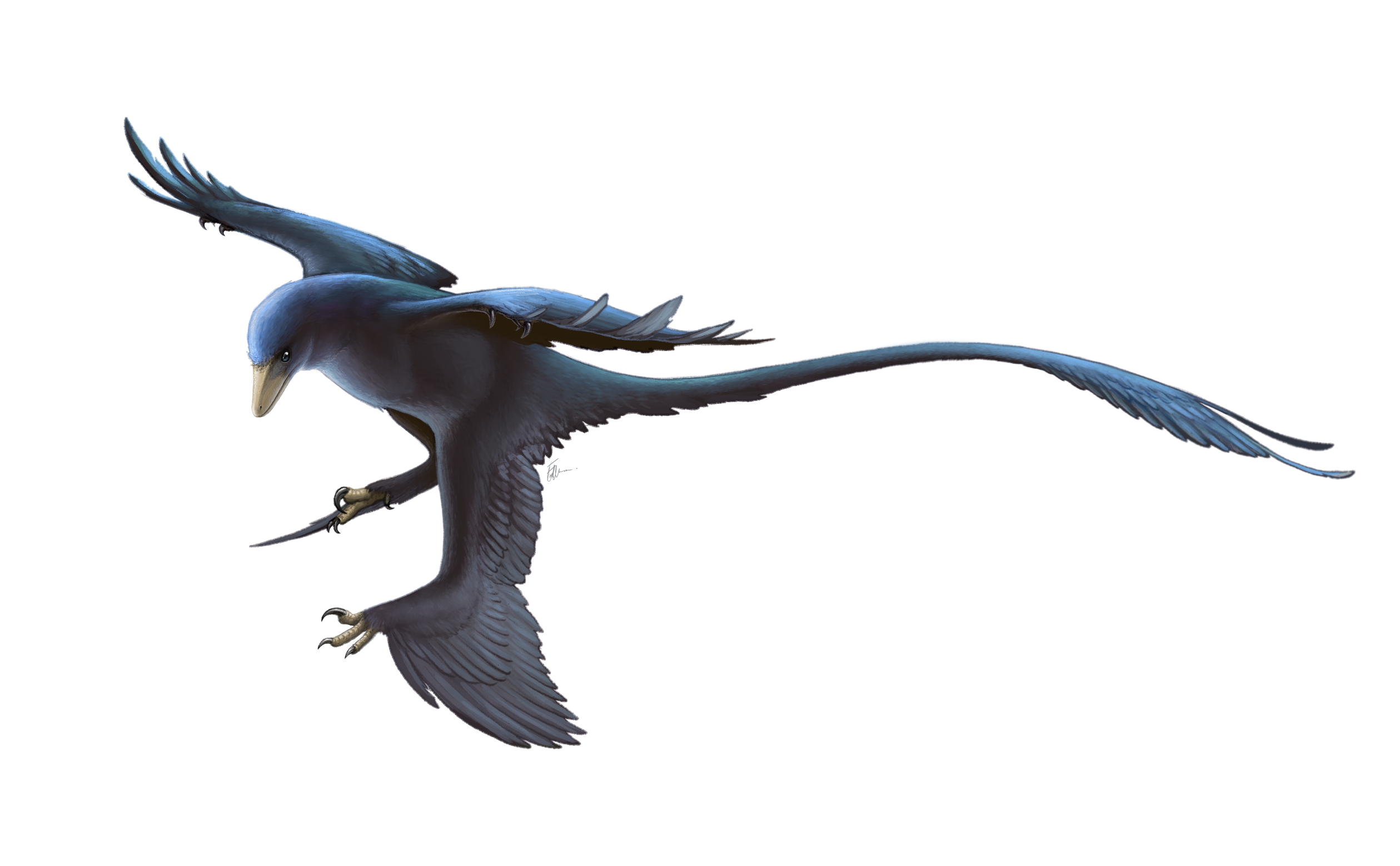
Restoration of M. gui with coloration based on fossilized melanosomes

In March 2012, Quanguo Li et al. determined the plumage coloration of Microraptor based on the new specimen BMNHC PH881, which also showed several other features previously unknown in Microraptor. By analyzing the fossilized melanosomes (pigment cells) in the fossil with scanning electron microscope techniques, the researchers compared their arrangements to those of modern birds. In Microraptor, these cells were shaped in a manner consistent with black, glossy coloration in modern birds. These rod-shaped, narrow melanosomes were arranged in stacked layers, much like those of a modern starling, and indicated iridescence in the plumage of Microraptor. Though the researchers state that the true function of the iridescence is yet unknown, it has been suggested that the tiny dromaeosaur was using its glossy coat as a form of communication or sexual display, much as in modern iridescent birds.

== Classification ==
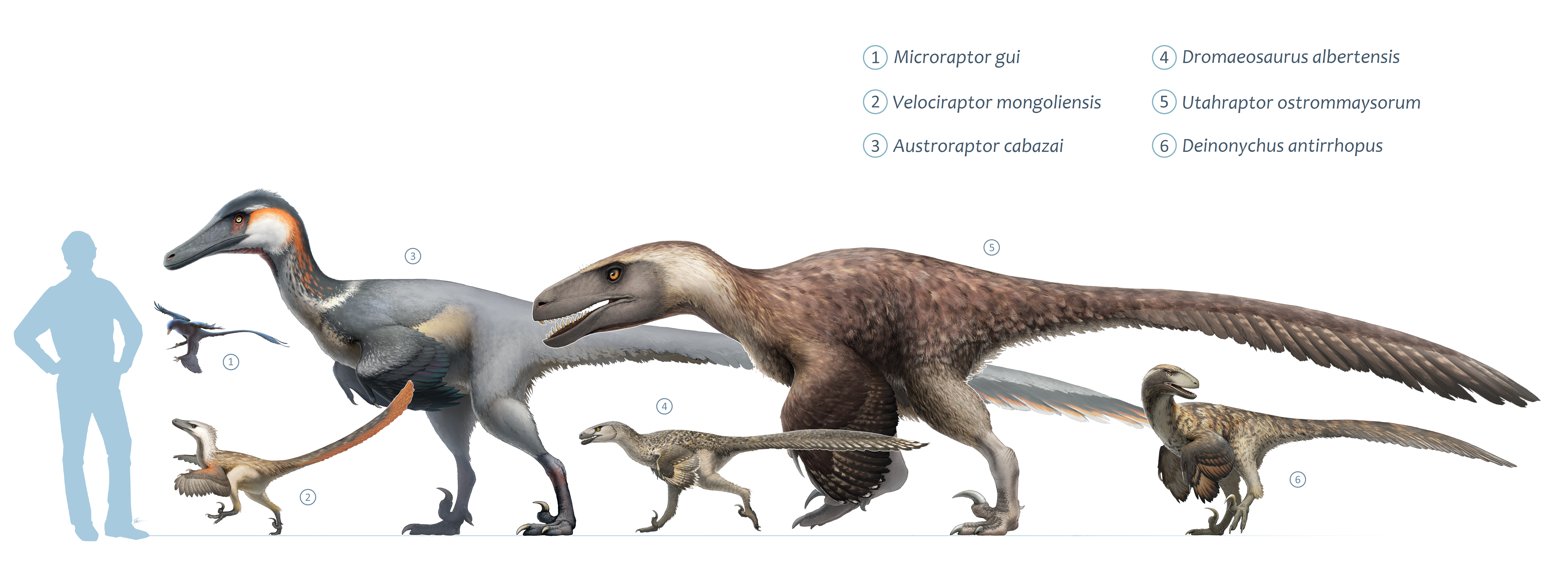
Size of Microraptor (1) compared with other dromaeosaurs

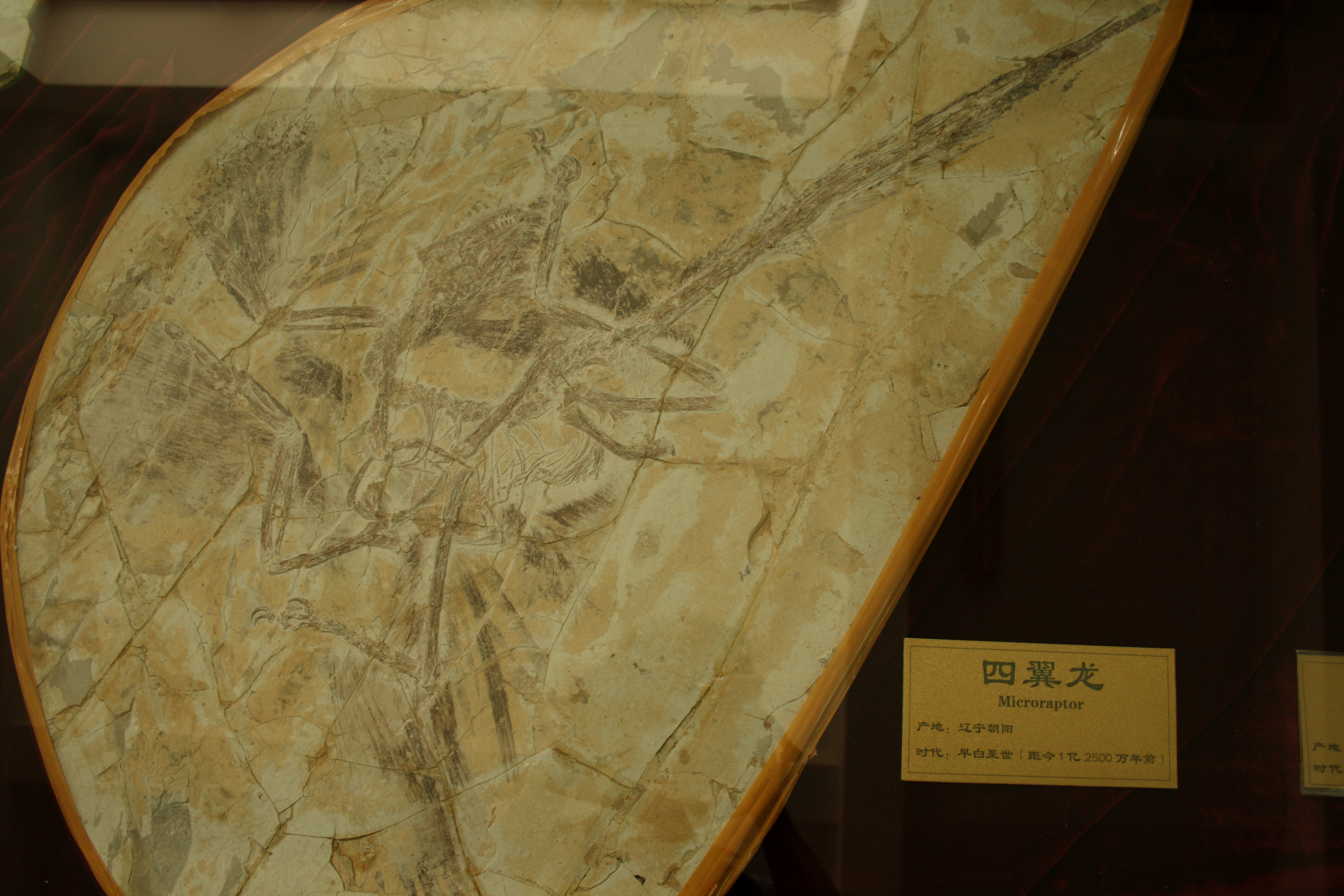
Specimen in the Shandong Tianyu Museum of Nature

The cladogram below follows a 2012 analysis by paleontologists Phil Senter, James I. Kirkland, Donald D. DeBlieux, Scott Madsen and Natalie Toth.

- Dromaeosauridae
  - Xiaotingia
  - - Unenlagiinae
    - - Shanag
      - - Eudromaeosauria
          - Saurornitholestinae
          - - Velociraptorinae
            - Dromaeosaurinae
        - Microraptoria
          - Tianyuraptor
          - - Hesperonychus
            - - - Microraptor sp.
                - - Microraptor gui
                  - Microraptor zhaoianus
              - - Cryptovolans
                - Graciliraptor
                - Sinornithosaurus

In a 2024 paper which reported the smallest known juvenile specimen of Microraptor, Wang and Pei included microraptorians and eudromaeosaurians within a new clade Serraraptoria.

== Paleobiology ==
=== Wings and flight ===
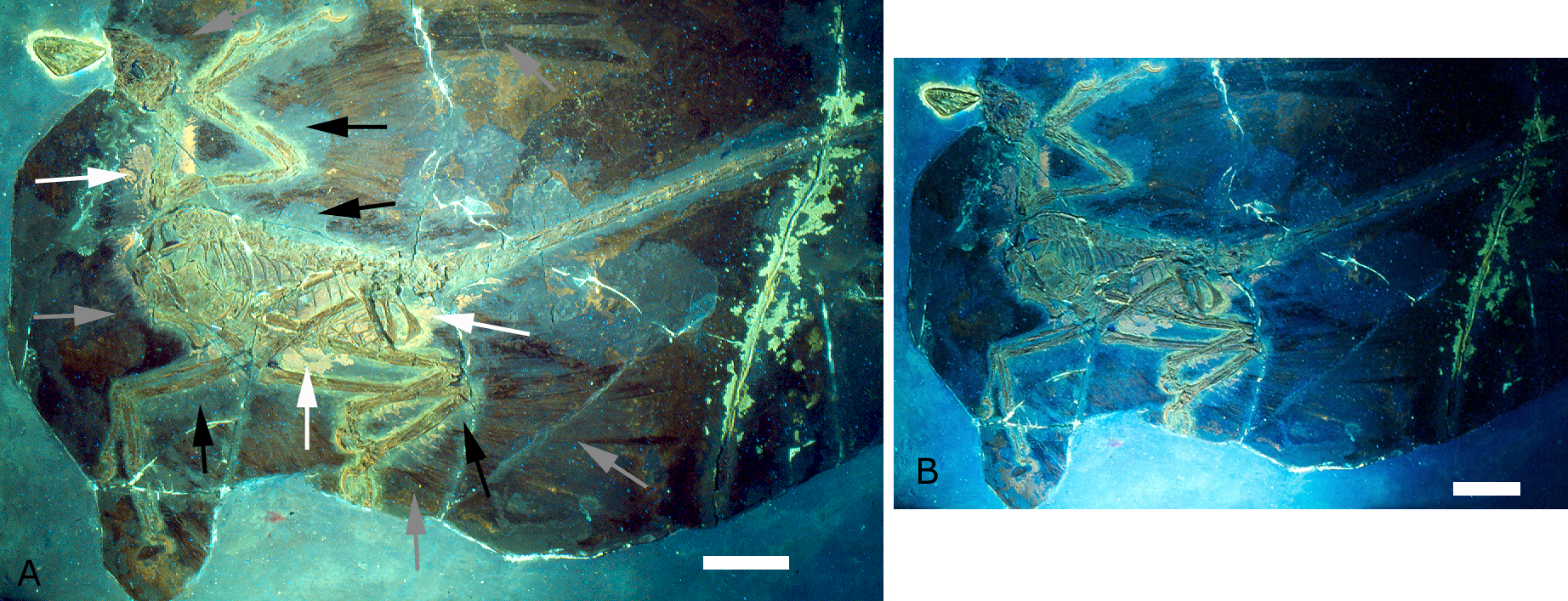
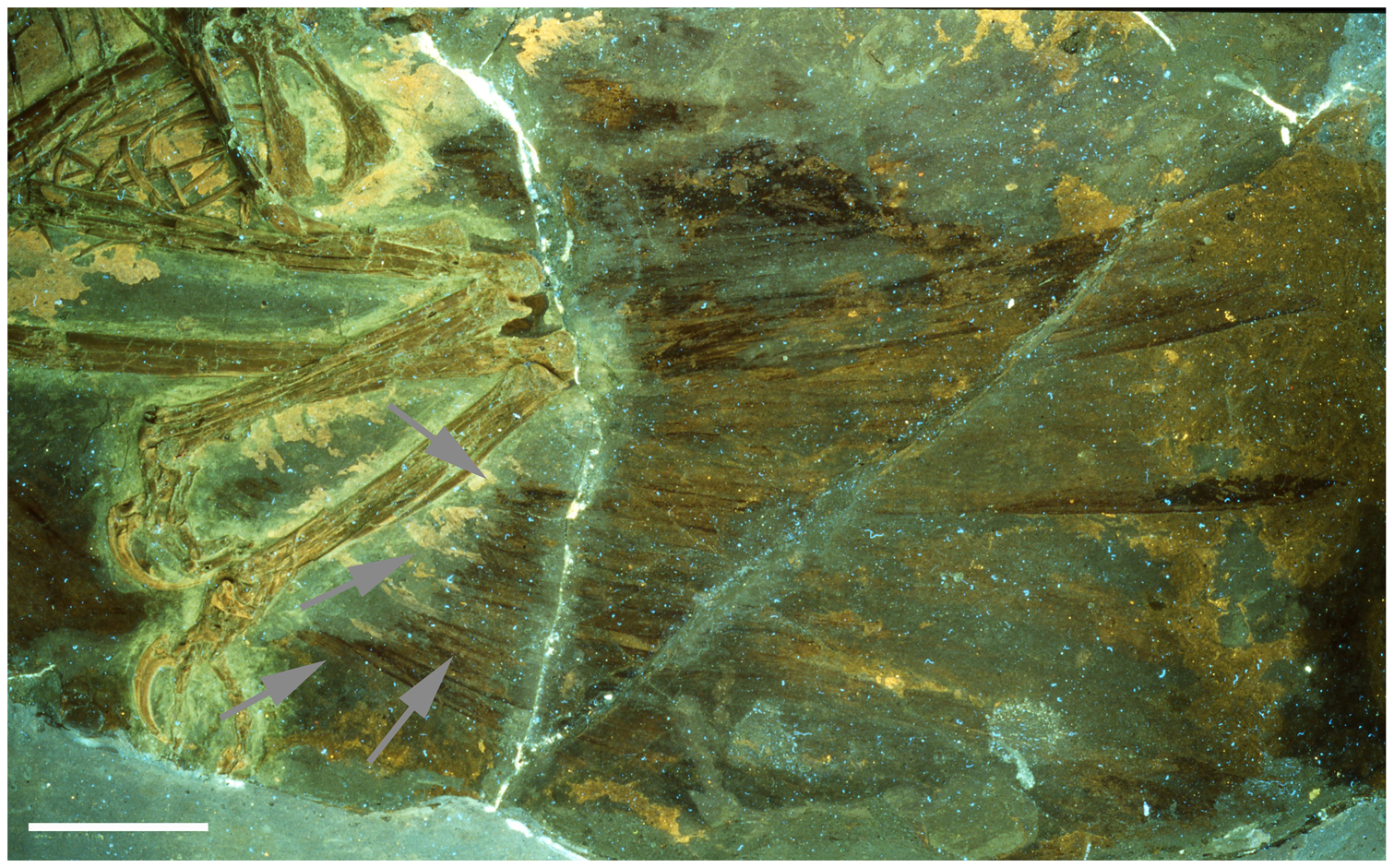
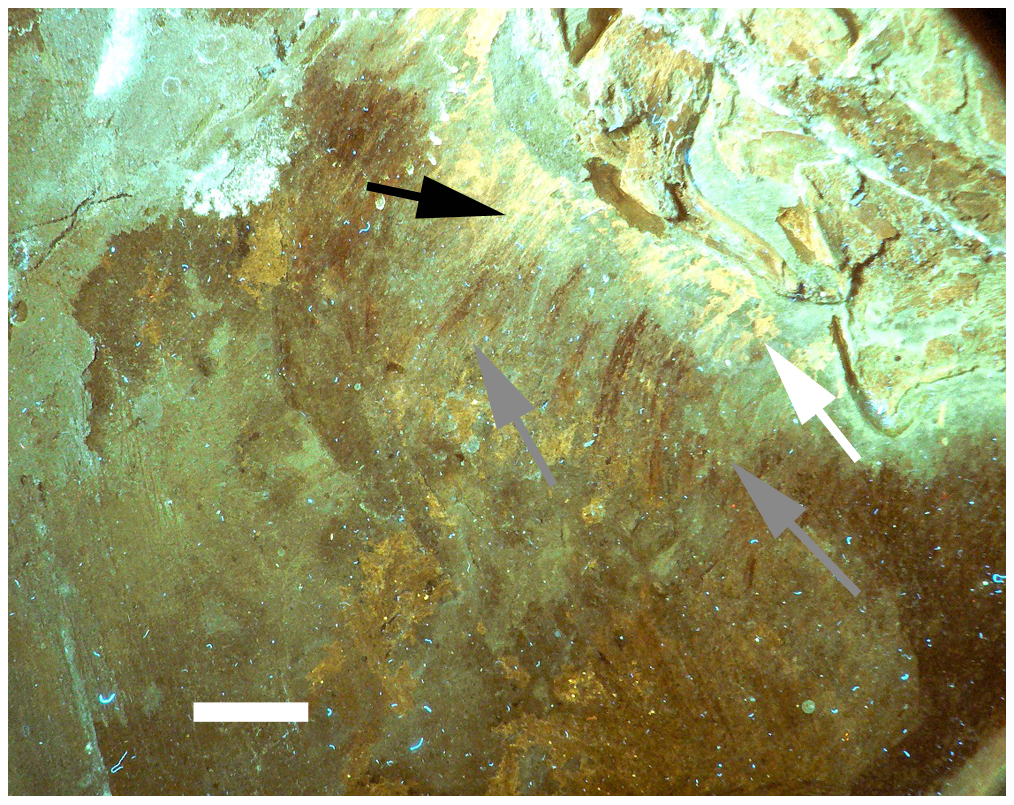
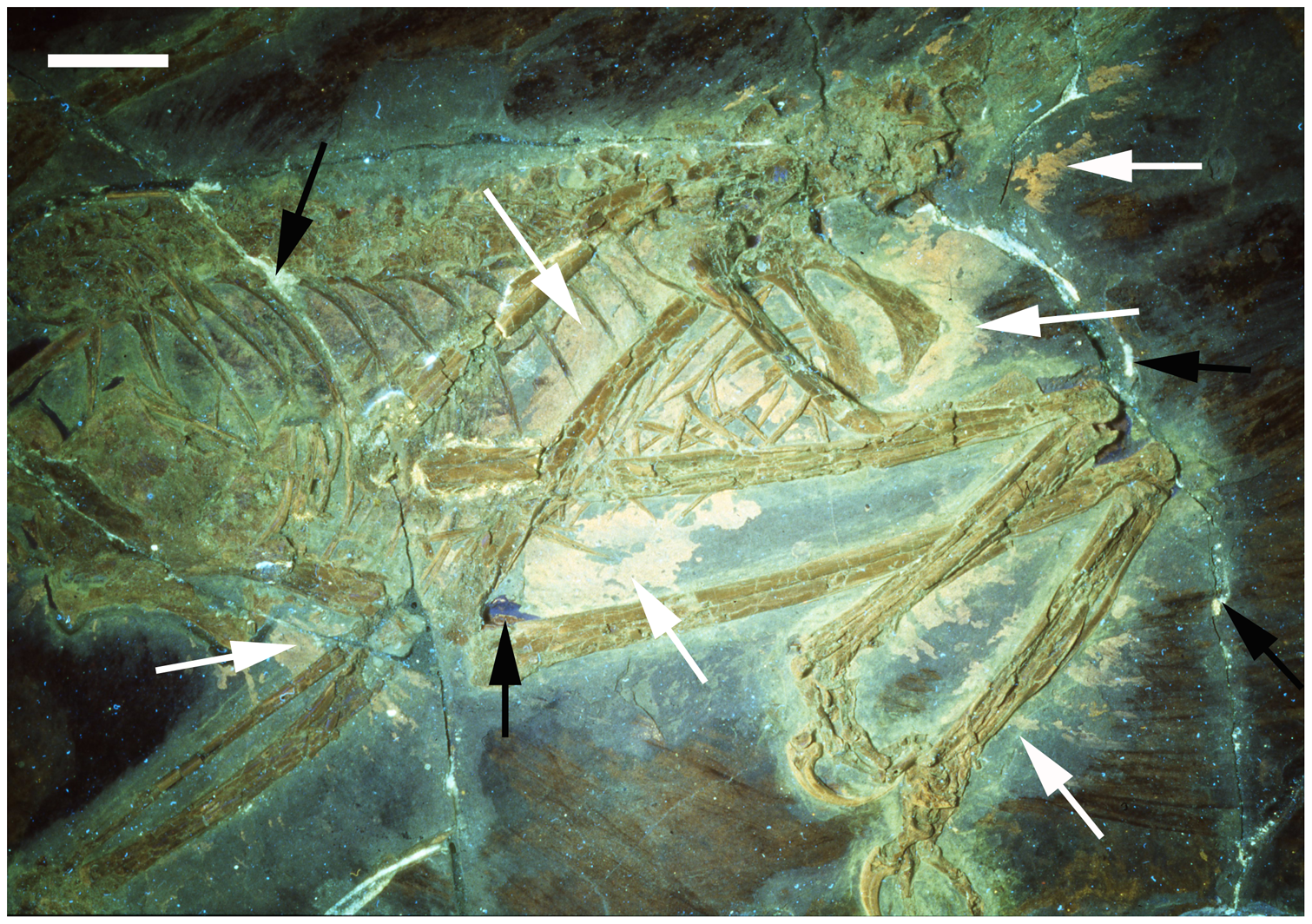
M. gui holotype (IVPP V 13352) under two different UV light filters, revealing the extent of preserved feathers and soft tissue

Microraptor had four wings, one on each of its forelimbs and hindlimbs, somewhat resembling one possible arrangement of the quartet of flight surfaces on a tandem wing aircraft of today. It had long pennaceous feathers on arms and hands 10–20 cm long (3.9–7.9 in) with legs and feet 11–15 cm long (4.3–5.9 in). The long feathers on the legs of Microraptor were true flight feathers as seen in modern birds, with asymmetrical vanes on the arm, leg, and tail feathers. As in modern bird wings, Microraptor had both primary (anchored to the hand) and secondary (anchored to the arm) flight feathers. This standard wing pattern was mirrored on the hindlegs, with flight feathers anchored to the upper foot bones as well as the upper and lower leg. Though not apparent in most fossils under natural light, due to obstruction from decayed soft tissue, the feather bases extended close to or in contact with the bones, as in modern birds, providing strong anchor points.

It was originally thought that Microraptor was a glider, and probably lived mainly in trees, because the hindwings anchored to the feet of Microraptor would have hindered their ability to run on the ground. Some paleontologists have suggested that feathered dinosaurs used their wings to parachute from trees, possibly to attack or ambush prey on the ground, as a precursor to gliding or true flight. In their 2007 study, Chatterjee and Templin tested this hypothesis as well, and found that the combined wing surface of Microraptor was too narrow to successfully parachute to the ground without injury from any significant height. However, the authors did leave open the possibility that Microraptor could have parachuted short distances, as between closely spaced tree branches. Wind tunnel experiments have demonstrated that sustaining a high-lift coefficient at the expense of high drag was likely the most efficient strategy for Microraptor when gliding between low elevations. Microraptor did not require a sophisticated, 'modern' wing morphology to be an effective glider. However, the idea that Microraptor was an arboreal glider relies on it to have regularly climbed or even lived in trees, when study of its anatomy have shown that its limb proportions fall in line with modern ground birds rather than climbers, and its skeleton shows none of the expected adaptations in animals specialized for climbing trees.

Describing specimens originally referenced as a distinctive species (Cryptovolans pauli), paleontologist Stephen Czerkas argued Microraptor may have been a powered flier, and indeed possibly a better flyer than Archaeopteryx. He noted that the fused sternum of Microraptor, asymmetrical feathers, and features of the shoulder girdle indicated that it could fly under its own power, rather than merely gliding. Today, most scientists agree that Microraptor had the anatomical features expected of a flying animal, though it would have been a less advanced form of flight compared to birds. For example, some studies suggest the shoulder joint was too primitive to allow a full flapping flight stroke. In the ancestral anatomy of theropod dinosaurs, the shoulder socket faced downward and slightly backward, making it impossible for the animals to raise their arms vertically, a prerequisite for the flapping flight stroke in birds. Studies of maniraptoran anatomy have suggested that the shoulder socket did not shift into the bird-like position of a high, upward orientation close to the vertebral column until relatively advanced avialans like the enantiornithes appeared. However, other scientists have argued that the shoulder girdle in some paravian theropods, including Microraptor, is curved in such a way that the shoulder joint could only have been positioned high on the back, allowing for a nearly vertical upstroke of the wing. This possibly advanced shoulder anatomy, combined with the presence of a propatagium linking the wrist to the shoulder (which fills the space in front of the flexed wing and may support the wing against drag in modern birds) and an alula, much like a "thumb-like" form of leading edge slot, may indicate that Microraptor was capable of true, powered flight.

Other studies have demonstrated that the wings of Microraptor were large enough to generate the lift necessary for powered launching into flight even without a fully vertical flight stroke. A 2016 study of incipient flight ability in paravians demonstrated that Microraptor was capable of wing-assisted incline running, as well as wing-assisted leaping and even ground-based launching.

Stephen Czerkas, Gregory S. Paul, and others have argued that the fact Microraptor could fly and yet is also very clearly a dromaeosaurid suggests that the Dromaeosauridae, including later and larger species such as Deinonychus, were secondarily flightless. The work of Xu and colleagues also suggested that the ancestors of dromaeosaurids were probably small, arboreal, and capable of gliding, although later discoveries of more primitive dromaeosaurids with short forelimbs unsuitable for gliding have cast doubt on this view. Work done on the question of flight ability in other paravians, however, showed that most of them probably would not have been able to achieve enough lift for powered flight, given their limited flight strokes and relatively smaller wings. These studies concluded that Microraptor probably evolved flight and its associated features (fused sternum, alula, etc.) independently of the ancestors of birds. In 2024, Kiat and O'Connor analyzed that Mesozoic birds and Microraptor had remex morphologies that are consistent with modern volant birds, while anchiornithids and Caudipteryx were secondarily flightless.

=== Hindwing posture ===
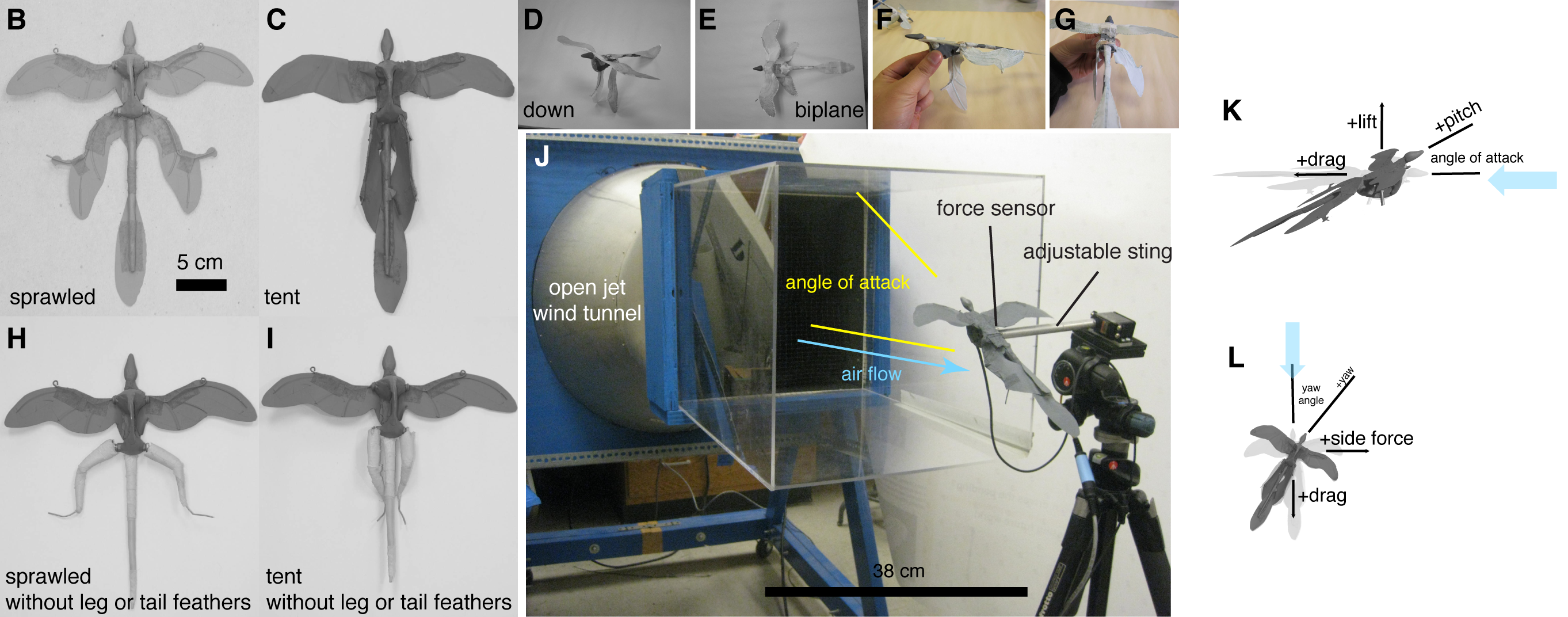
Wind tunnel experiments with different wing configurations

Sankar Chatterjee suggested in 2005 that, in order for Microraptor to glide or fly, the forewings and hindwings must have been on different levels (as on a biplane) and not overlaid (as on a dragonfly), and that the latter posture would have been anatomically impossible. Using this biplane model, Chatterjee was able to calculate possible methods of gliding and determined that Microraptor most likely employed a phugoid style of gliding: launching itself from a perch, the animal would have swooped downward in a deep U-shaped curve and then lifted again to land on another tree. The feathers not directly employed in the biplane wing structure, like those on the tibia and the tail, could have been used to control drag and alter the flight path, trajectory, etc. The orientation of the hindwings would also have helped the animal control its gliding flight. Chatterjee also used computer algorithms that test animal flight capacity to test whether or not Microraptor was capable of true, powered flight, as opposed to or in addition to passive gliding. The resulting data showed that Microraptor did have the requirements to sustain level powered flight, so it is theoretically possible that the animal flew, as opposed to gliding.

Some paleontologists have doubted the biplane hypothesis, and have proposed other configurations. A 2010 study by Alexander et al. described the construction of a lightweight three-dimensional physical model used to perform glide tests. Using several hindleg configurations for the model, they found that the biplane model, while not unreasonable, was structurally deficient and needed a heavy-headed weight distribution for stable gliding, which they deemed unlikely. The study indicated that a laterally abducted hindwing structure represented the most biologically and aerodynamically consistent configuration for Microraptor. A further analysis by Brougham and Brusatte, however, concluded that Alexander's model reconstruction was not consistent with all of the available data on Microraptor and argued that the study was insufficient for determining a likely flight pattern for Microraptor. Brougham and Brusatte criticized the anatomy of the model used by Alexander and his team, noting that the hip anatomy was not consistent with other dromaeosaurs. In most dromaeosaurids, features of the hip bone prevent the legs from splaying horizontally; instead, they are locked in a vertical position below the body. Alexander's team used a specimen of Microraptor which was crushed flat to make their model, which Brougham and Brusatte argued did not reflect its actual anatomy. Later in 2010, Alexander's team responded to these criticisms, noting that the related dromaeosaur Hesperonychus, which is known from complete hip bones preserved in three dimensions, also shows hip sockets directed partially upward, possibly allowing the legs to splay more than in other dromaeosaurs. However, Hartman and colleagues suggested that Hesperonychus is not a dromaeosaur, but actually an avialan close to modern birds like Balaur bondoc based on phylogenetic analyses in 2019.

=== Ground movement ===
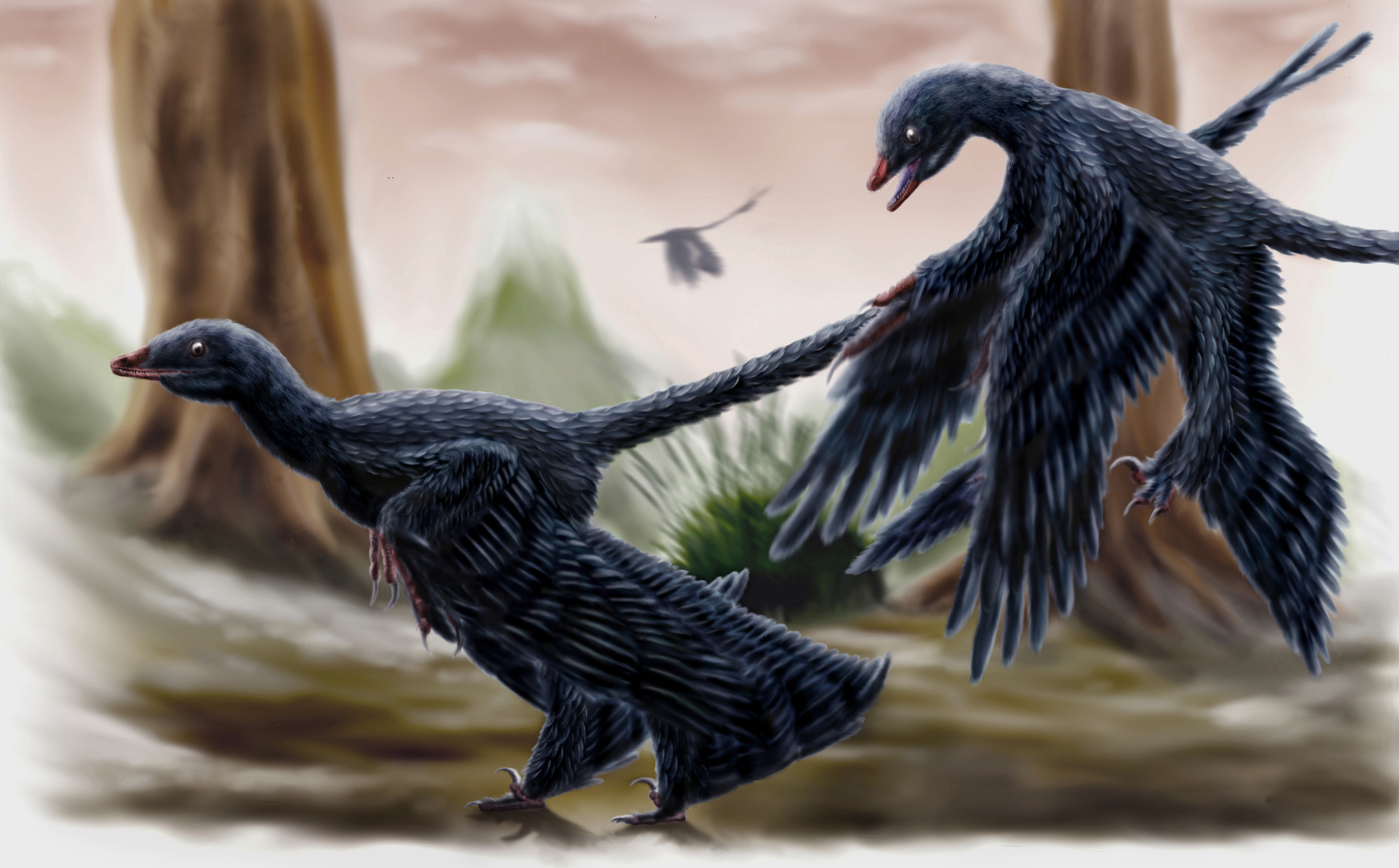
Restoration of two individuals by the ground

Due to the extent of the hindwings onto most of the animal's foot, many scientists have suggested that Microraptor would have been awkward during normal ground movement or running. The front wing feathers would also have hindered Microraptor when on the ground, due to the limited range of motion in the wrist and the extreme length of the wing feathers. A 2010 study by Corwin Sullivan and colleagues showed that, even with the wing folded as far as possible, the feathers would still have dragged along the ground if the arms were held in a neutral position, or extended forward as in a predatory strike. Only by keeping the wings elevated, or the upper arm extended fully backward, could Microraptor have avoided damaging the wing feathers. Therefore, it may have been anatomically impossible for Microraptor to have used its clawed forelimbs in capturing prey or manipulating objects.

=== Implications ===
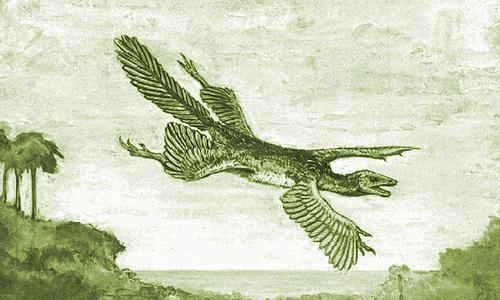
William Beebe's hypothetical "Tetrapteryx" with four wings, 1915

The unique wing arrangement found in Microraptor raised the question of whether the evolution of flight in modern birds went through a four-winged stage, or whether four-winged gliders like Microraptor were an evolutionary side-branch that left no descendants. As early as 1915, naturalist William Beebe had argued that the evolution of bird flight may have gone through a four-winged (or tetrapteryx) stage. Chatterjee and Templin did not take a strong stance on this possibility, noting that both a conventional interpretation and a tetrapteryx stage are equally possible. However, based on the presence of unusually long leg feathers in various feathered dinosaurs, Archaeopteryx, and some modern birds such as raptors, as well as the discovery of further dinosaurs with long primary feathers on their feet (such as Pedopenna), the authors argued that the current body of evidence, both from morphology and phylogeny, suggests that bird flight did shift at some point from shared limb dominance to front-limb dominance and that all modern birds may have evolved from four-winged ancestors, or at least ancestors with unusually long leg feathers relative to the modern configuration.

=== Feeding ===
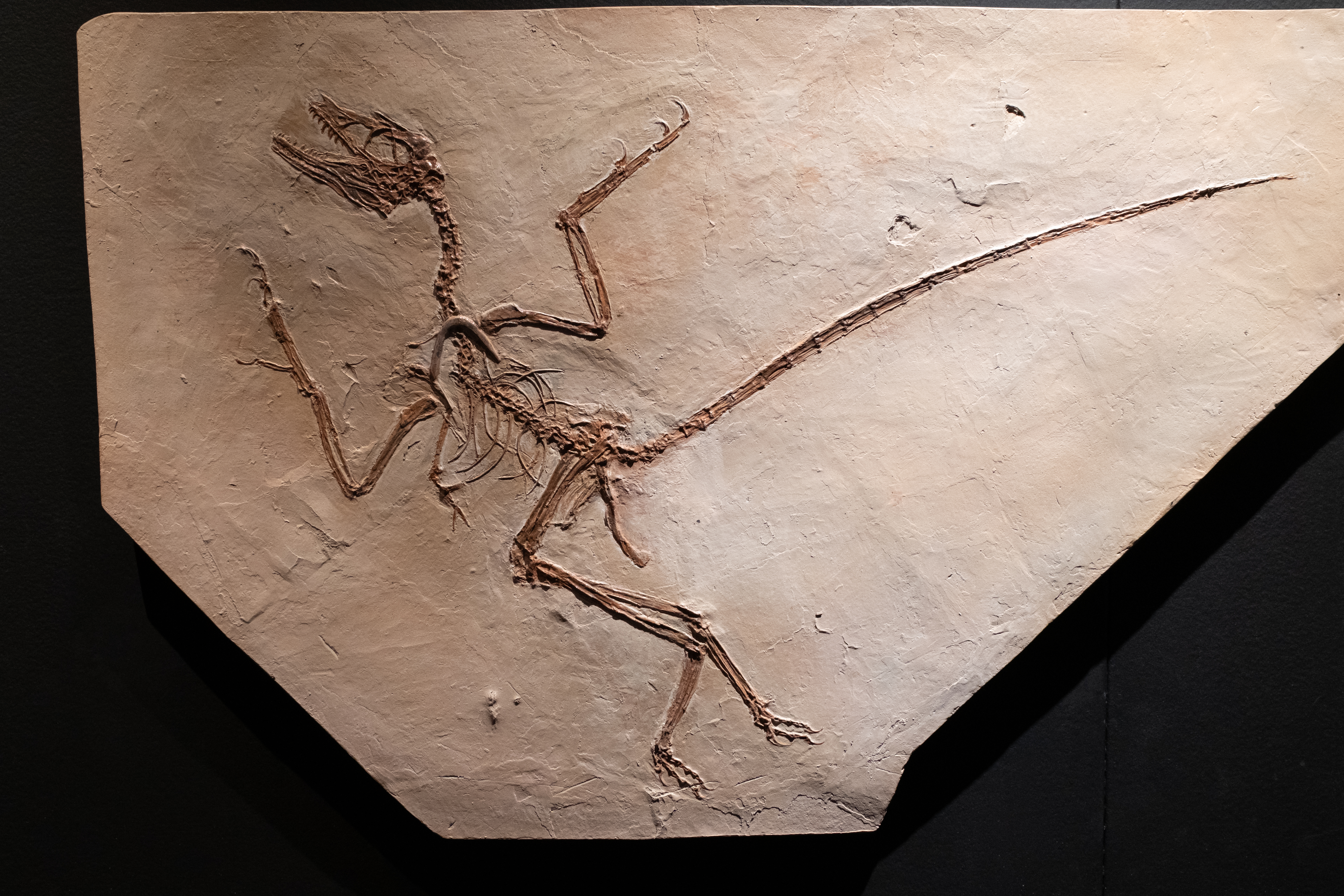
Cast in Horniman Museum

In 2010 researchers announced that further preparation of the type fossil of M. zhaoianus revealed preserved probable gut contents, and a full study on them was later published in 2022 by David Hone and colleagues. These consisted of the remains of a mammal, primarily a complete and articulated right foot (including all tarsals, metatarsals, and most of the phalanges) as well as the shafts of additional long bones and potentially other fragments. The foot skeleton is similar to those of Eomaia and Sinodelphys. It corresponds to an animal with an estimated snout to vent length of 80 mm (3.1 in) and a mass of 13–43 g (0.46–1.52 oz). The unguals of the foot are less curved than in Eomaia or Sinodelphys, indicating that the mammal could climb but less effectively than in the two latter genera and so was likely not arboreal but potentially scansorial.

It is ambiguous whether the mammal had been predated upon or scavenged by Microraptor, although the lack of other definitive body parts consumed may suggest the low-muscle mass foot may have been eaten during a late stage of carcass consumption, possibly through scavenging. The find is a rare example of a theropod definitively consuming a Mesozoic mammal. The only other two examples are the indeterminate tyrannosauroid specimen GMV 2124 (also known as NGMC 2124) and the holotype of Huadanosaurus, both of which are previously attributed to Sinosauropteryx.

In the 6 December 2011 issue of Proceedings of the National Academy of Sciences, Jingmai O'Connor and coauthors described a specimen of Microraptor gui containing bones of an arboreal enantiornithean bird in its abdomen, specifically a partial wing and feet. Their position implies the bird was swallowed whole and head-first, which the authors interpreted as implying that the Microraptor had caught and consumed the bird in the trees, rather than scavenging it.

In 2013 researchers announced that they had found fish scales in the abdominal cavity of another M. gui specimen. The authors contradicted the prior suggestion that M. gui hunted only in an arboreal environment, proposing that it was also an adept hunter of fish as well. They further argued that the specimen showed a probable adaptation to a fish-eating diet, pointing to the first three teeth of the mandible being inclined anterodorsally, a characteristic often associated with piscivory. They concluded that Microraptor was an opportunistic feeder, hunting the most common prey in both arboreal and aquatic habitats.

Both of these studies regarded each gut contents as instances of predation. However, Hone and colleagues (2022) questioned the reliability of these interpretations and wrote that both could just as equally be attributed to scavenging. Further, they argued against Microraptor being a specialist in either or both arboreal or aquatic hunting, citing the broad range of vertebrate gut contents (i.e. fish, mammals, lizards, birds) as evidence for a generalist hunting strategy, and that neither required that Microraptor being a specialist for hunting in either habitats.

Morphometric analysis of the size and shape of its pedal claws, paired with assessment of its joint articulations and pedal soft tissues using laser-stimulated fluorescence, suggests that Microraptor may have had a similar raptorial lifestyle to modern hawks.

In 2019, a new genus of scleroglossan lizard (Indrasaurus) was described from a specimen found in the stomach of a Microraptor. The Microraptor apparently swallowed its prey head first, a behavior typical of modern carnivorous birds and lizards. The Indrasaurus bones lacked marked pitting and scarring, indicating that the Microraptor died shortly after eating the lizard and before significant digestion had occurred.

Unlike its fellow paravian Anchiornis, Microraptor has never been found with gastric pellets, despite the existence of four Microraptor specimens that preserve stomach contents. This suggests that Microraptor passed indigestible fur, feathers, and bits of bone in its droppings instead of producing pellets.

Based on the morphology of the scleral ring of the eye, it has been suggested Microraptor hunted at night. However, the discovery of dark and glossy plumage in Microraptor may suggest otherwise, as no modern birds with comparable plumage are known to be nocturnal.

== See also ==
- Dinosaur coloration
- Timeline of dromaeosaurid research
