= Xu Xing =

Xu Xing, Hsü Hsing or Xing Xu may refer to:

- Xu Xing (philosopher) (許行; 4th century BCE), philosopher of Ancient China
- Xu Xing (paleontologist) (徐星; born 1969)
- Xu Xing (writer) (徐星；born 1956)
