= Ji Qiang =

Chinese paleontologist

Qiang Ji
- 季强
- Born: October 6, 1951 (age 75); Rudong County, Jiangsu, China
- Education: Nanjing University
- Known for: Research on conodonts, the Jehol Biota, feathered dinosaurs and the origin of birds
- Awards: Future Science Prize (2025)
- Scientific career
- Fields: Paleontology
- Workplaces: Chinese Academy of Geological Sciences; National Geological Museum of China; Nanjing Institute of Geology and Palaeontology; Senckenberg Museum of Natural History
- Doctoral advisor: Wang Chengyuan

Qiang Ji (born 6 October 1951) is a Chinese paleontologist from Rudong County, Jiangsu Province, China.

Ji graduated from the Department of Geology at Nanjing University. He subsequently pursued postgraduate studies in conodont research under Professor Wang Chengyuan at the Nanjing Institute of Geology and Palaeontology, Chinese Academy of Sciences. He later conducted postdoctoral research on conodonts under Professor Willi Ziegler at the Senckenberg Museum of Natural History in Germany, supported by an Alexander von Humboldt Foundation fellowship. After returning to China, Ji worked at the Chinese Academy of Geological Sciences and subsequently served as director of the National Geological Museum of China in Beijing from 1995 to 2000. He later returned to the Institute of Geology of the Chinese Academy of Geological Sciences, where he continued his research career. Ji initially gained recognition for his research on Late Devonian and Early Carboniferous conodont biostratigraphy and the Devonian–Carboniferous boundary stratotype. His work attracted considerable international attention. From 1995 onwards, he expanded his research to the Yanliao Biota and the Jehol Biota of western Liaoning and adjacent regions.

In the 1990s, Ji became internationally known for his research on feathered dinosaurs and the origin of birds, particularly following the discovery and description of Sinosauropteryx. His subsequent research contributed to the study of the evolutionary relationship between dinosaurs and birds In 2025, Ji, together with Xu Xing and Zhou Zhonghe, received the Future Science Prize in Life Sciences for their contributions to establishing the fossil evidence for the origin of birds from dinosaurs.
