= Stephen A. Czerkas =

American paleontologist

Stephen Andrew Czerkas
- Born: September 19, 1951; Alhambra, California
- Died: January 22, 2015 (aged 63)
- Spouse: Sylvia
- Scientific career
- Fields: Paleontology

Stephen Andrew Czerkas (born September 19, 1951, in Alhambra, California; died January 22, 2015) was an American sculptor and paleontologist. He frequently worked as a contributor to both museums and the motion picture industry, and was later the director and co-founder of The Dinosaur Museum, which purchased the Archaeoraptor fossil chimera. His life-sized replicas of dinosaurs, including members of the Deinonychus and Allosaurus genera, were among the first to incorporate accurate feathering and dorsal spines.

== Life and work ==
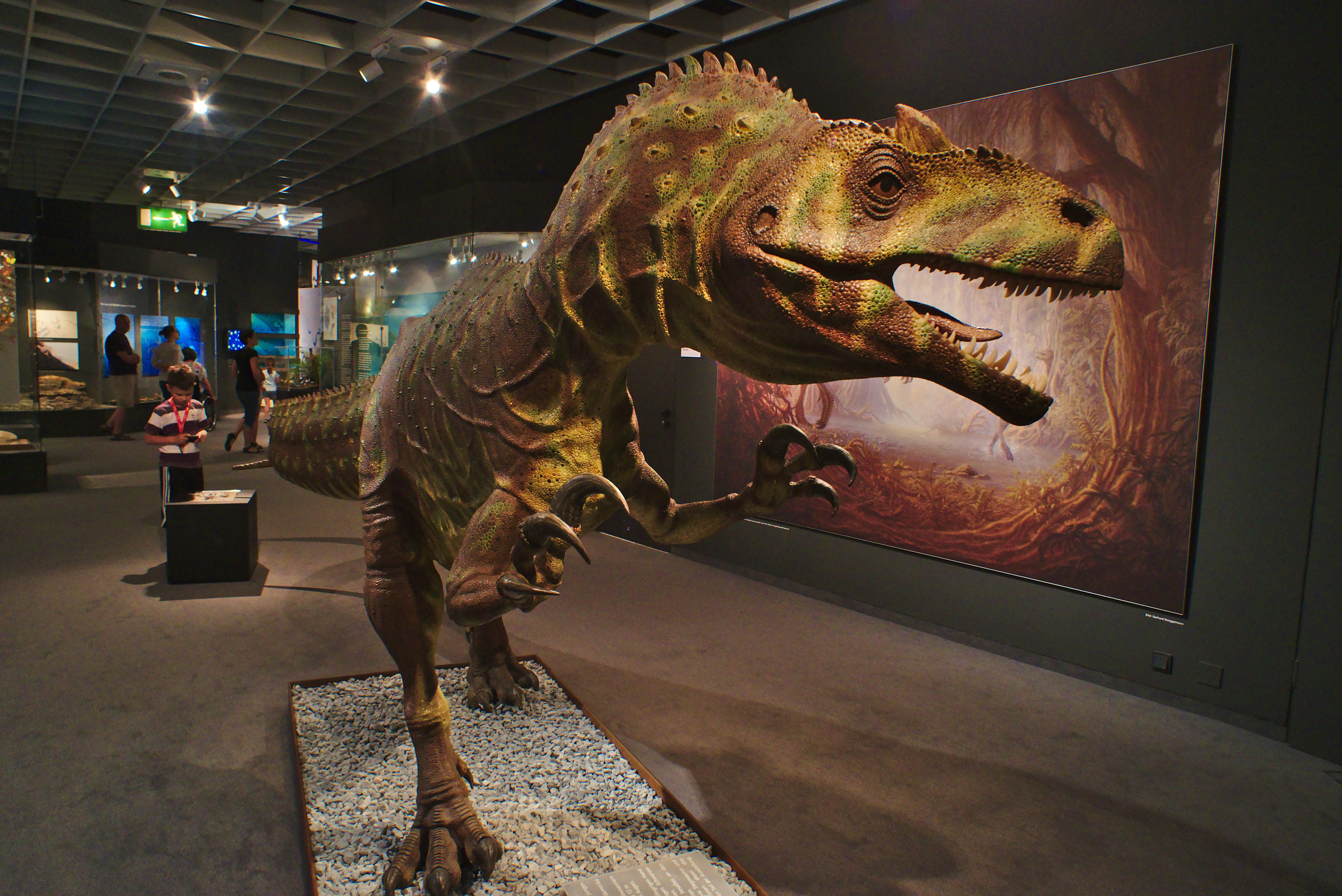
Sculpture of Allosaurus by Czerkas in Museum für Naturkunde, Münster

Czerkas' sculptural works have been featured in the National Museum of Natural History, the Vienna Museum of Natural History, and the Natural History Museum of Los Angeles County, among other museums. In addition, Czerkas contributed to the motion picture industry, notably producing photorealistic sculptures for the 1977 film Planet of Dinosaurs.

He is perhaps best known for his part in the Archaeoraptor controversy, in which Czerkas purchased a part-bird, part-dinosaur specimen for The Dinosaur Museum from a Chinese dealer. This fossil specimen courted a great deal of controversy, after which it was determined that the fossil had been glued together as a composite of multiple species. This controversy continues to circulate in creationist media sources as a purported example of widespread fraud in the evolutionary sciences.

Czerkas had a wife, Sylvia. Stephen Czerkas died on January 22, 2015, of liver cancer.
