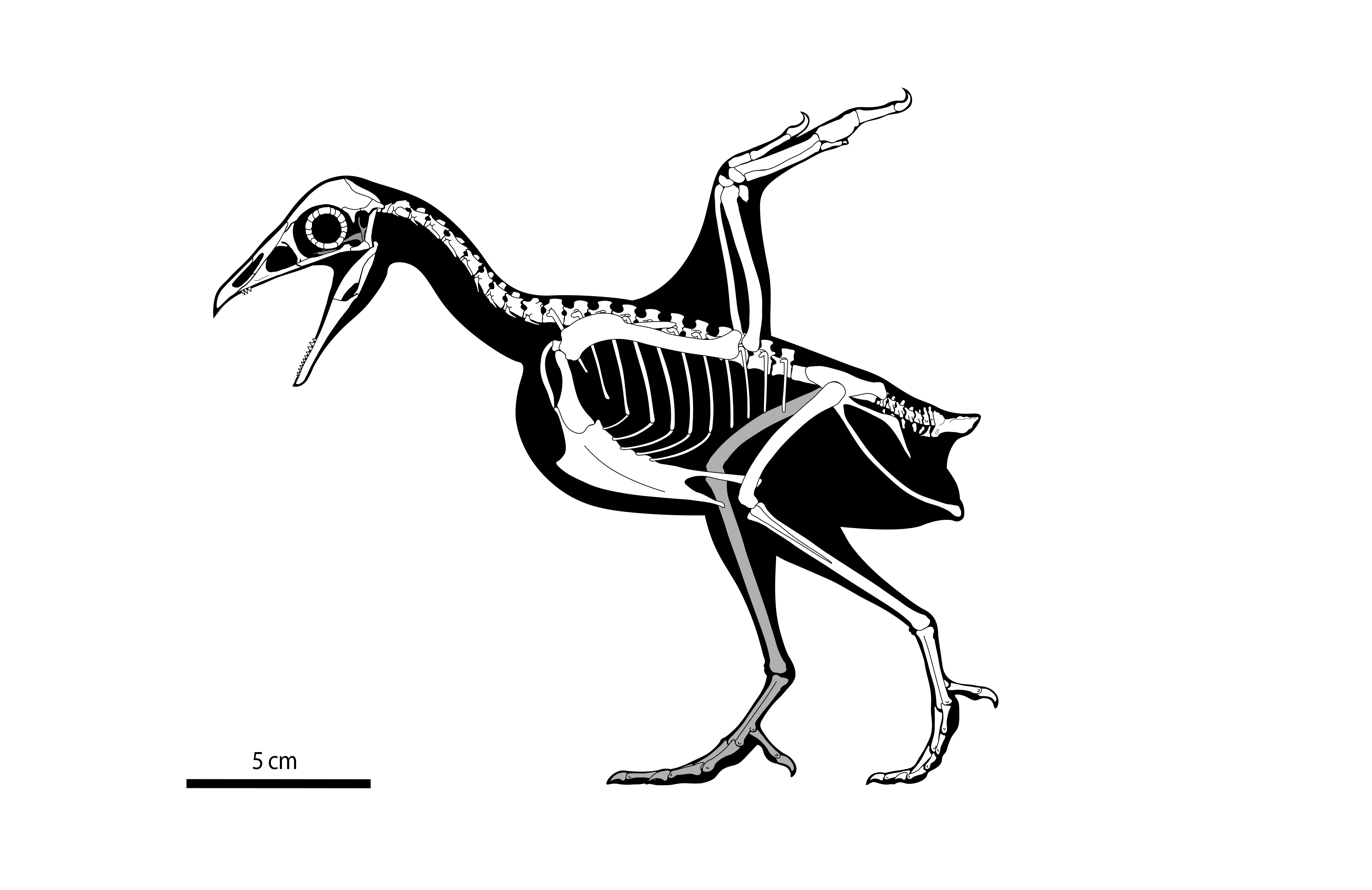
- Reconstructed skeleton

Scientific classification
- Kingdom: Animalia
- Phylum: Chordata
- Class: Reptilia
- Clade: Dinosauria
- Clade: Saurischia
- Clade: Theropoda
- Clade: Avialae
- Family: †Gansuidae
- Genus: †Shuilingornis; Wang et al., 2025
- Species: †S. angelai

Binomial name
- †Shuilingornis angelai Wang et al., 2025

= Shuilingornis =

Shuilingornis Temporal range: Early Cretaceous, Aptian

Genus of extinct gansuid birds

Shuilingornis (meaning "pretty and vivid bird") is an extinct genus of gansuid euornithean birds from the Early Cretaceous Jiufotang Formation of China. The genus contains a single species, S. angelai, known from a nearly complete articulated skeleton. As a member of the Gansuidae, Shuilingornis represents one of the earliest known birds known to demonstrate semi-aquatic adaptations.

== Discovery and naming ==
The Shuilingornis holotype specimen, LY2022JZ3002, was discovered in sediments of the Jiufotang Formation ('Lamadong locality') in Jianchang County of Huludao City, Liaoning Province, China. The specimen is a nearly complete and articulated skeleton, preserved on a single slab. Some feather imprints are visible around the hand of the holotype. An egg-shaped pigmented spot is preserved in the abdominal region, indicating some form of soft tissue. Similarly, a dark spot observed in the orbital region likely represents traces of the eye.

In 2024, Wang et al. announced Shuilingornis angelai as a new genus and species of gansuid avialans based on these fossil remains. The generic name, Shuilingornis, combines the Chinese word "shuiling", meaning "pretty and vivid", with the Greek word "ornis", meaning "bird". The specific name, angelai, honors Piero Angela, an Italian science communicator and journalist. The final version of the article describing Shuilingornis angelai was published in the following year.

== Description ==
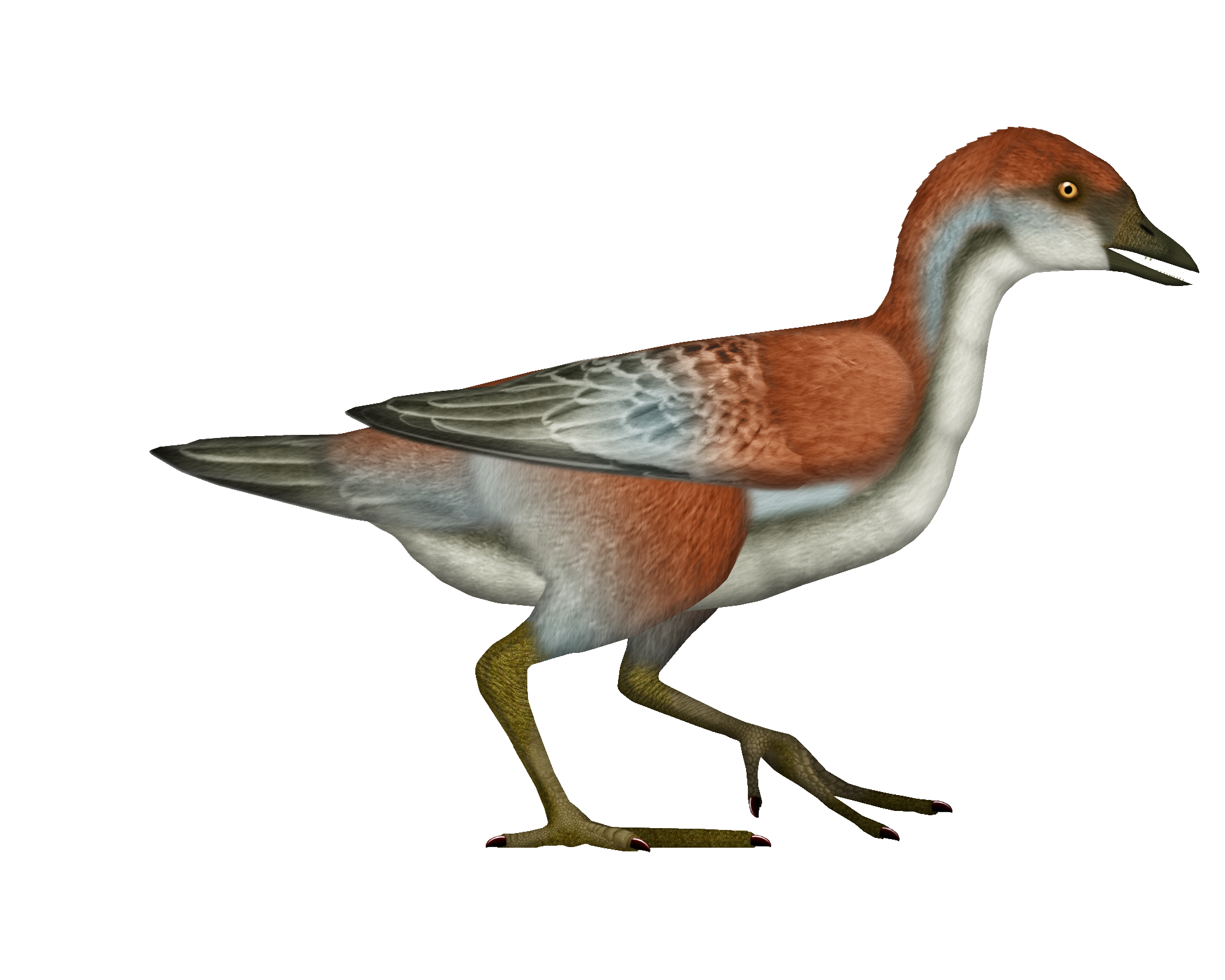
Speculative life restoration

Based on the length of the tibiotarsus, Shuilingornis was smaller than other members of the Gansuidae, 70% the size of Gansus, and 88% the size of Changzuiornis. Bone histology of the preserved ulna, indicates that the Shuilingornis holotype was a young adult when it died.

== Classification ==
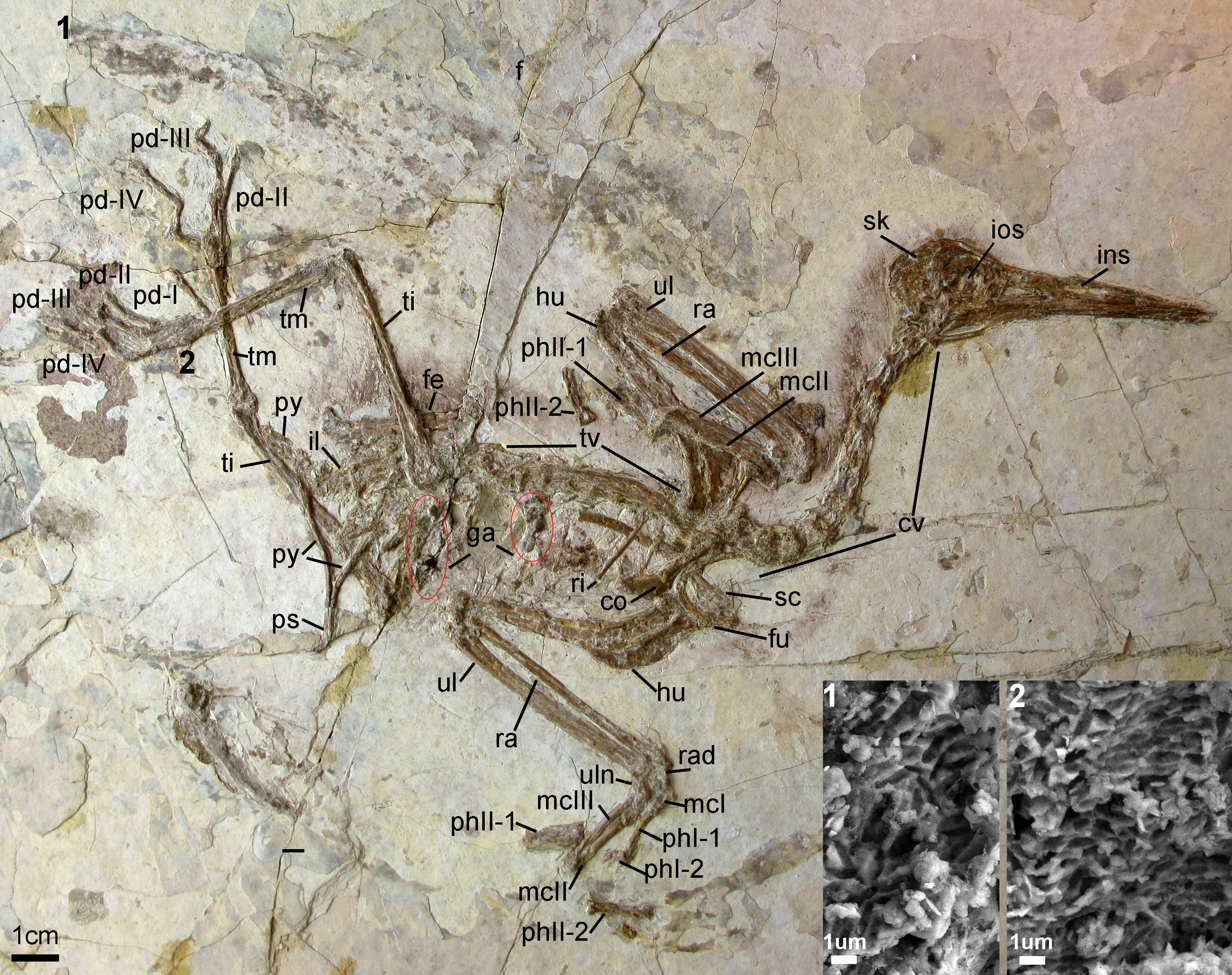
Fossil of the closely related Changzuiornis

In their phylogenetic analyses, Wang et al. (2025) recovered Shuilingornis as a member of the euornithean clade Gansuidae, closely related to Changzuiornis. Other members of this clade include Gansus, Iteravis, Khinganornis, and possibly Hollanda. Their results are displayed in the cladogram below:

- - †Enantiornithes
  - Euornithes
    - †Cruralispennia
    - - †Zhongjianornis
      - - - †Dingavis
          - - †Yumenornis
            - †Xinghaiornis
        - - †Archaeorhynchus
          - - †Schizooura
            - - - †Tianyuornis
                - †Archaeornithura
              - - - †Parahongshanornis
                  - †Longicrusavis
                  - †Hongshanornis
                - - †Yixianornis
                  - †Yanornis
                  - †Ambiortus
                  - - †Piscivoravis
                    - - †Gansuidae
                        - - †Iteravis
                          - †Gansus yumenensis
                        - - †Khinganornis
                          - - †Shuilingornis
                            - †Changzuiornis
                      - - Ornithuromorpha

== See also ==
- List of bird species described in the 2020s
