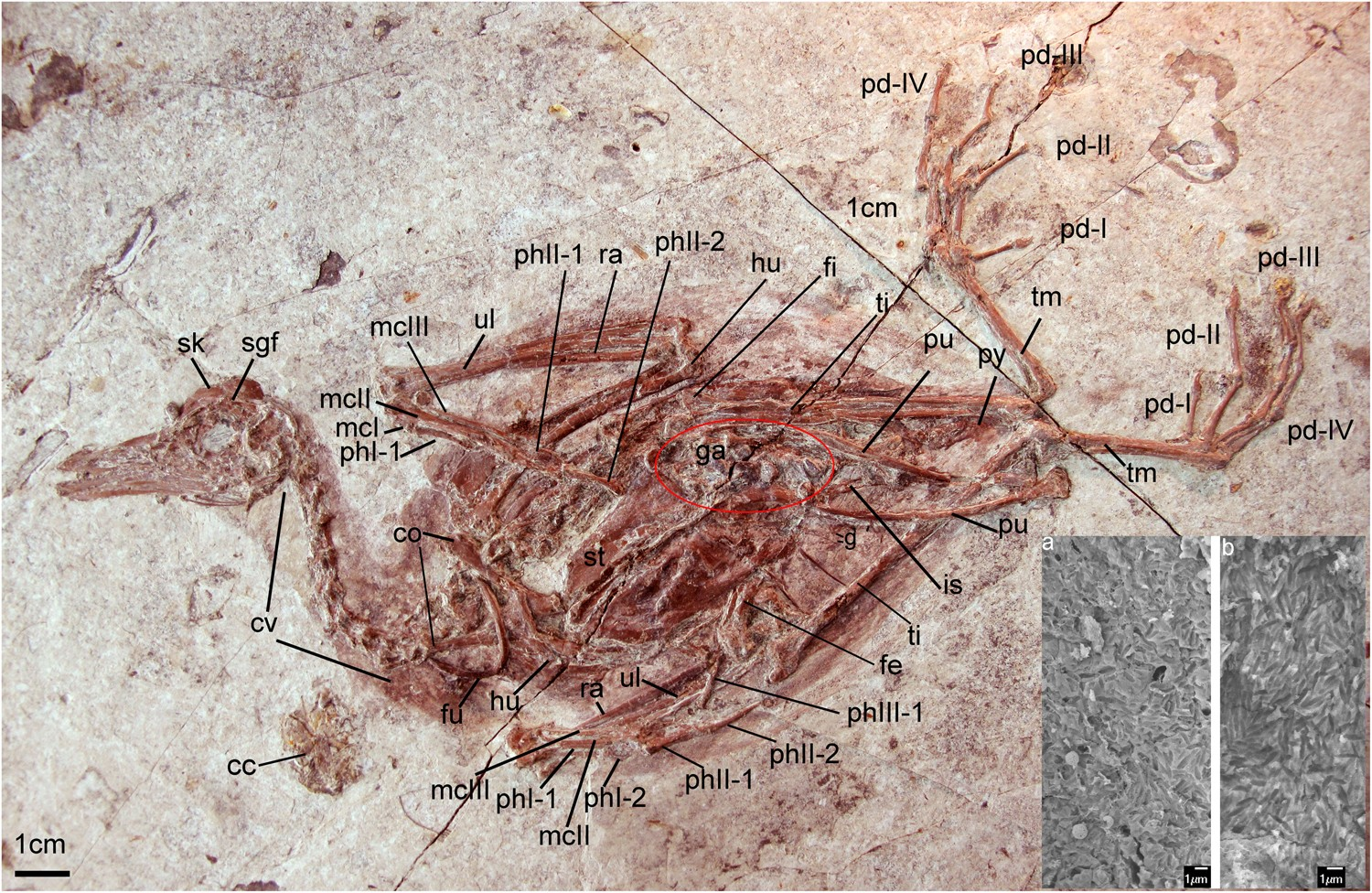
- AGB5841, a specimen referred to I. huchzermeyeri

Scientific classification
- Kingdom: Animalia
- Phylum: Chordata
- Class: Reptilia
- Clade: Dinosauria
- Clade: Saurischia
- Clade: Theropoda
- Clade: Avialae
- Clade: Ornithuromorpha
- Genus: †Iteravis; Zhou, Wang, & O'Connor, 2014

Type species
- †Iteravis huchzermeyeri Zhou, Wang, & O'Connor, 2014

Synonyms
- †Gansus zheni? Liu et al., 2014

= Iteravis =

Iteravis Temporal range: Early Cretaceous, ~125–120 Ma

Extinct genus of avialan

External image
- Speculative life restoration of Iteravis

Iteravis (lit. 'journey bird') is an extinct genus of ornithuromorph bird known from the Early Cretaceous Jiufotang Formation of what is today the Liaoning Province of China. The genus contains a single species, Iteravis huchzermeyeri, named in honor of the archosaur palaeontologist Dr. Fritz Huchzermeyer, who died shortly before Iteravis was described. The relationships between Iteravis and species of Gansus have been debated, with some researchers arguing for a synonymy between the former and G. zheni, and others recovering a closer relationship between the two genera within the family Gansuidae.

== Classification and taxonomy ==
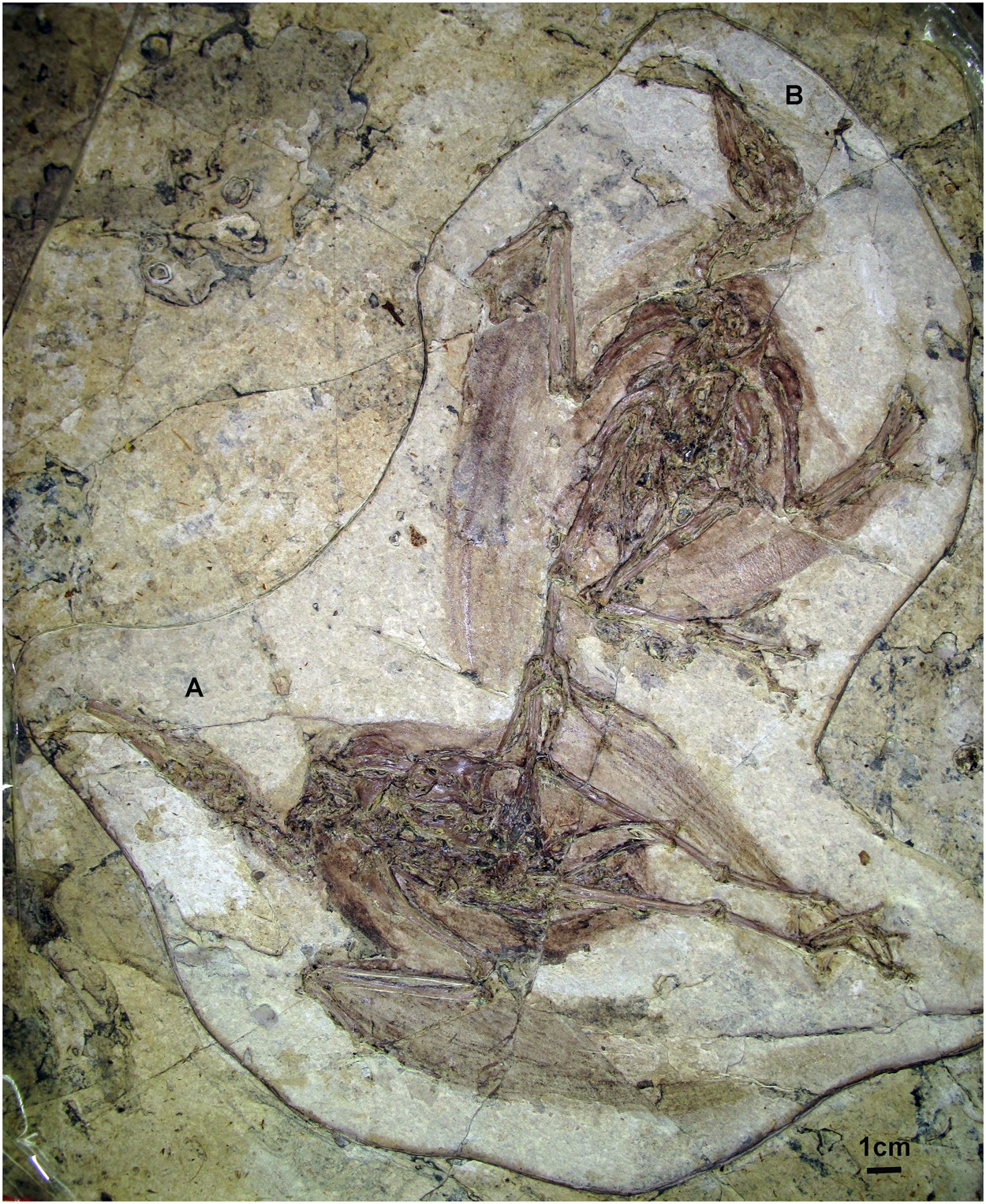
AGB5834-1 and 2, referred to I. huchzermeyeri

In 2018, Wang and colleagues described three new specimens similar to Iteravis huchzermeyeri and Gansus zheni, together comprising the only ornithurines described from the Sihedang locality of the Jiufotang Formation. Based on similarities between the three new specimens and the holotypes of the two named species, the authors concluded they all represented the same taxon, for which the species name Iteravis huchzermeyeri has priority. Furthermore, their phylogenetic analysis placed these in a single clade diverging before Gansus yumenensis, the type species of Gansus. These results are displayed as Topology A in an abbreviated cladogram below. Shortly thereafter, Ju and colleagues (2021) independently published a more detailed comparison of I. huchzermeyeri and G. zheni. Similar to Wang et al. (2018), these authors concluded that the two species are synonymous. They further emphasized the distinction between Iteravis and Gansus (G. yumenensis) at the genus level. O'Connor and colleagues (2021) expressed that there are small differences observed between I. huchzermeyeri and G. zheni of "uncertain taxonomic significance". As such, they treated the two species as distinct, pending more thorough research. Regardless, their phylogenetic analyses placed these species as very close relatives (either in an unresolved polytomy or as sister taxa), distantly related to G. yumenensis, reinforcing the generic distinction of the two Gansus species. These results are displayed as Topology B in an abbreviated cladogram below.

Topology A: Results of Wang et al. (2018)

- Ornithurae
  - - Hongshanornis
    - Longicrusavis
  - - - Yanornis
      - - Yixianornis
        - Songlingornis
    - - Changzuiornis
      - - - Iteravis
          - 'Gansus zheni'
          - AGB5841
        - - Gansus yumenensis
          - - - Baptornis
              - Hesperornis
            - - Ichthyornis
              - - Apsaravis
                - - Iaceornis
                  - Aves

Topology B: Implied weighting results of O'Connor et al. (2021)

- - - - Hongshanornis
      - Longicrusavis
    - - Iteravis
      - Gansus zheni (holotype and referred specimens)
  - - - Yixianornis
      - - Yanornis
        - - Songlingornis
          - - Hollanda
            - Archaeornithura
    - - - Yumenornis
        - - IVPP V26199
          - Gansus yumenensis
      - - Jiuquanornis
        - - - Apsaravis
            - Ambiortus
          - - Changmaornis
            - Ornithurae

Wang et al., 2025 (describing Shuilingornis angelai) and Huang et al., 2026 (describing Kunpengornis anhuimusei), both using phylogenetic matrices developed by Andrea Cau, recovered Iteravis as the sister taxon to Gansus yumenensis. The former analysis placed these taxa in a broader Gansuidae, also including Khinganornis, Shuilingornis, and Changzuiornis, while the latter analysis recovered Gansuidae as restricted to Iteravis and Gansus, diverging after a monophyletic clade comprising the aforementioned taxa. These results are displayed in the abbreviated cladograms below:

Topology A: Results of Wang et al. (2025)

- - †Yixianornis
  - †Yanornis
  - †Ambiortus
  - - †Piscivoravis
    - - †Gansuidae
        - - †Iteravis
          - †Gansus yumenensis
        - - †Khinganornis
          - - †Shuilingornis
            - †Changzuiornis
      - - Ornithuromorpha

Topology B: Results of Huang et al. (2026)

- - †Yanornithidae
  - - - †Kunpengornis
      - †Piscivoravis
    - - - †Khinganornis
        - - †Shuilingornis
          - - †Changzuiornis
            - †Hollanda
      - - †Gansuidae
          - †Iteravis
          - †Gansus yumenensis
        - - Ornithuromorpha

== Palaeobiology ==
Iteravis ate larger particles of food than Archaeorhynchus, although the exact details of its diet remain enigmatic.
