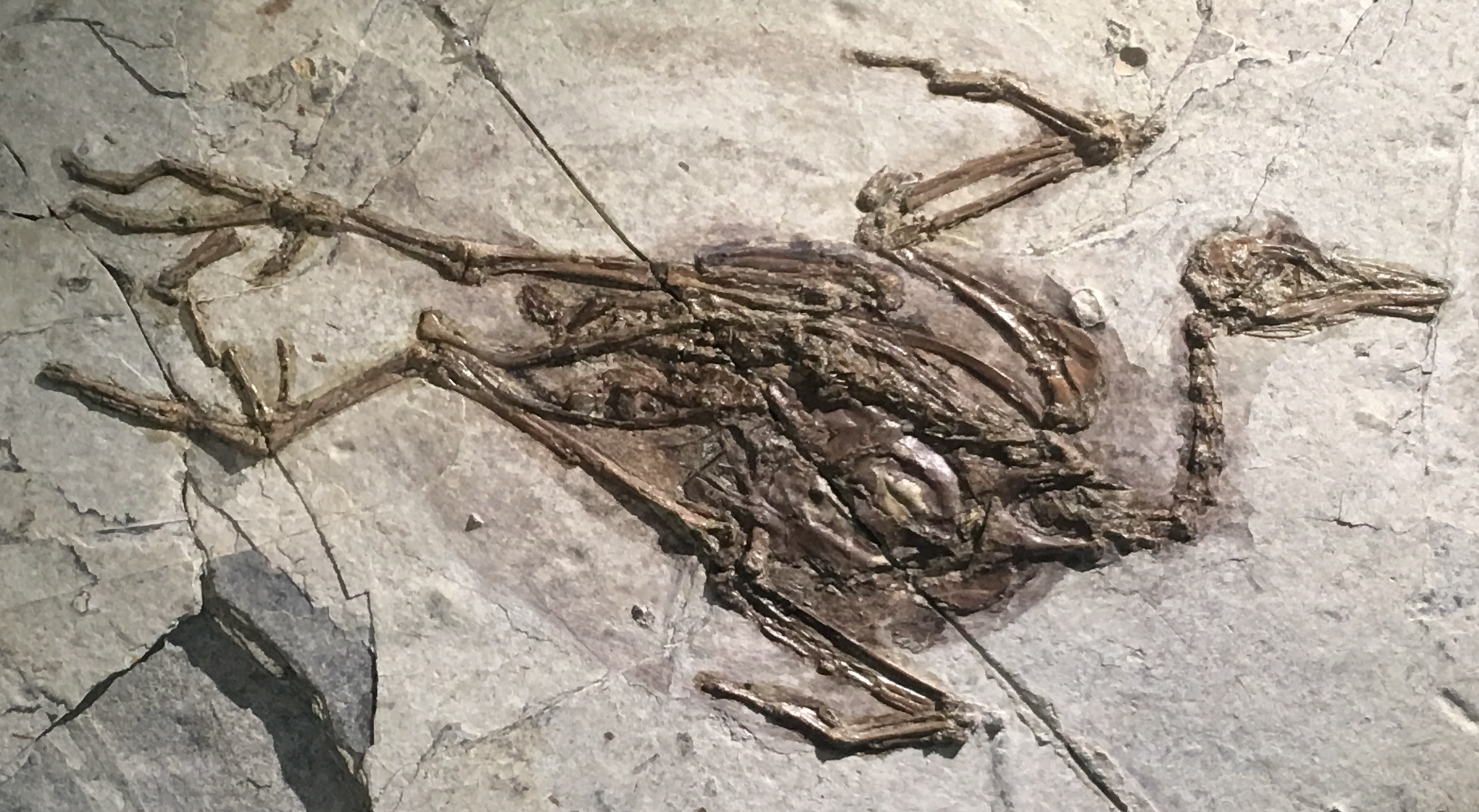
- Fossil specimen of Gansus zheni

Scientific classification
- Kingdom: Animalia
- Phylum: Chordata
- Class: Reptilia
- Clade: Dinosauria
- Clade: Saurischia
- Clade: Theropoda
- Clade: Avialae
- Clade: Euornithes
- Family: †Gansuidae; Hou & Liu, 1984

Type genus
- Gansus Hou & Liu, 1984

Genera
- †Changzuiornis; †Gansus; †Hollanda?; †Iteravis; †Khinganornis; †Shuilingornis

= Gansuidae =

Gansuids Temporal range: Cretaceous (Aptian–?Campanian)

Extinct family of Cretaceous birds

Gansuidae is an extinct family of euornithean birds known from the Early Cretaceous of China and possibly the Late Cretaceous of Mongolia.

== History and taxonomy ==
The Gansuidae was originally established as a monotypic family by Hou & Liu in their 1984 description of their new genus Gansus from the Xiagou Formation. Their characterization for this clade included shorebirds with slender toes, a long digit IV, and a laterally compressed tarsometatarsus shorter than the third and fourth digits. A second Gansus species, G. zheni, was described in 2014 from the Jiufotang Formation.

The clade received little attention in the following years, with most analyses failing to recover a substantial clade of taxa besides Gansus spp. However, the 2024 description of the genus Shuilingornis—also from the Jiufotang Formation—shed light on the relationships of several euornithean birds, with several taxa clustering in a monophyletic clade. Besides Gansus (the type genus of the family) and Shuilingornis, the group likely also includes Changzuiornis (Jiufotang Fm.), Iteravis (Yixian Formation), and Khinganornis (Longjiang Formation). These five genera were found in Aptian-aged (Early Cretaceous) outcrops in China.

The genus Hollanda is known from a fragmentary skeleton described in 2010 from the Campanian-aged (Late Cretaceous) Barun Goyot Formation of Mongolia. Originally identified as an ornithuromorphan, later analyses recovered conflicting phylogenetic positions, suggesting possible affinities with Songlingornis or even the Enantiornithes. In their description of Shuilingornis, Wang et al. (2024) noted Hollanda as one of several "wildcard taxa". When included in their phylogenetic analyses, it was recovered as a late-diverging member of the Gansuidae, as the sister taxon to Changzuiornis. However, they cautioned that these particular results were tentative and should not be considered definitive without the discovery of additional fossil material.

== Classification ==
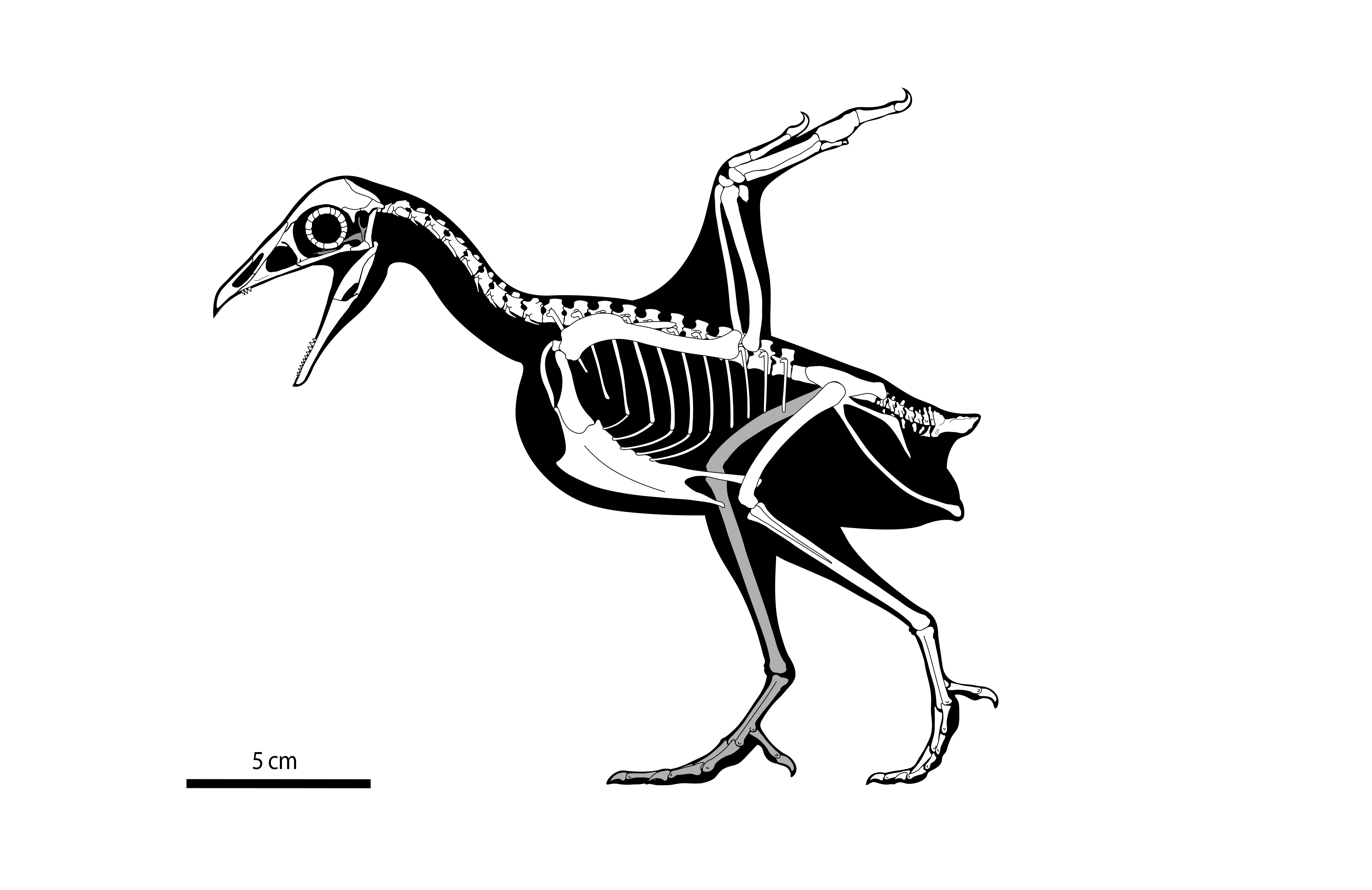
Reconstructed skeleton of Shuilingornis

In their phylogenetic analyses, Wang et al. (2024) recovered the Gansuidae as a clade of euornithean birds as the sister taxon to the Ornithuromorpha. Their results are displayed in the cladogram below:

- - †Enantiornithes
  - Euornithes
    - †Cruralispennia
    - - †Zhongjianornis
      - - - †Dingavis
          - - †Yumenornis
            - †Xinghaiornis
        - - †Archaeorhynchus
          - - †Schizooura
            - - - †Tianyuornis
                - †Archaeornithura
              - - - †Parahongshanornis
                  - †Longicrusavis
                  - †Hongshanornis
                - - †Yixianornis
                  - †Yanornis
                  - †Ambiortus
                  - - †Piscivoravis
                    - - Gansuidae
                        - - †Iteravis
                          - †Gansus yumenensis
                        - - †Khinganornis
                          - - †Shuilingornis
                            - †Changzuiornis
                      - - Ornithuromorpha
