= Khinganornis =

Khinganornis Temporal range: Early Cretaceous, ~121.23 Ma

Scientific classification
- Kingdom: Animalia
- Phylum: Chordata
- Class: Reptilia
- Clade: Dinosauria
- Clade: Saurischia
- Clade: Theropoda
- Clade: Avialae
- Family: †Gansuidae (?)
- Genus: †Khinganornis; Wang et al., 2020
- Species: †K. hulunbuirensis

Binomial name
- †Khinganornis hulunbuirensis Wang et al., 2020

Extinct bird genus

Khinganornis is an extinct genus of euornithean bird from the Early Cretaceous (Aptian age) Longjiang Formation of Inner Mongolia, China. The genus contains a single species, Khinganornis hulunbuirensis, known from a nearly complete skeleton preserved on a slab and counter slab. The toes and lower legs of Khinganornis are elongated, similar to modern birds with an amphibious or wading ecology. Phylogenetic analyses place it as a close relative or member of the family Gansuidae.

== Discovery and naming ==
Khinganornis type locality in Morin Dawa Banner, China

In May 2017, following fieldwork efforts at the 'Pigeon Hill locality', researchers collected the remains of an ornithuromorph bird. (Note: These authors used Ornithuromorpha in reference to a broader clade called Euornithes by later researchers. Using the updated definition of Ornithuromorpha, Khinganornis and Gansuidae are excluded from this clade.) This site represents outcrops of the Longjiang Formation, located in the Greater Khingan mountain range in Morin Dawa Daur Autonomous Banner of Inner Mongolia Autonomous Region, China. The specimen is housed at Hebei Geo University, where it is permanently accessioned as specimen SGM-AVE-2017001. It consists of a nearly complete skeleton, including the skull, preserved on a slab and counter slab.

Following their fieldwork conducted in May, Xuri Wang, Long Wang, and Qiang Ji published a preliminary note in October 2017, in which they reported the discovery of a new genus of ornithuromorph birds at Pigeon Hill. In 2020, X. Wang, Andrea Cau, and colleagues described Khinganornis hulunbuirensis as a new genus and species of ornithuromorph birds based on these fossil remains, establishing SGM-AVE-2017001 as the holotype specimen. The generic name, Khinganornis, combines a reference to the discovery in the Greater Khingan mountain range with the Greek word ornis, meaning 'bird'. The specific name, hulunbuirensis, references the city of Hulunbuir, in which the type locality is located.

The Pigeon Hill locality of the Longjiang Formation is situated in the northern Greater Khingan mountain range, part of the Dayangshu Basin. These rock layers are roughly equivalent to the more well-known Jehol Biota, albeit located around 500 kilometres (310 mi) northeast. While thousands of bird fossils have been discovered in the Jehol Group, with close to one hundred species having been described, none had been found in the Longjiang Formation. As such, SGM-AVE-2017001 represented the first bird fossil found and named in the formation and the broader Greater Khingan region at the time of its description. It was also the northernmost discovery of a Jehol-type bird in China. In 2022, Wang and colleagues described Beiguornis, a new enantiornithean from Pigeon Hill, increasing the avialan diversity from the locality.

== Description ==
Khinganornis is recognized as a medium-sized euornithean bird. Histology of the humerus and femur indicates that these bones in the holotype individual grew continuously throughout its life. The morphology of layered bone on the outside of the humerus, in addition to endosteal bone (lining of the inner bone cavity) in certain regions, indicates this individual was fully grown when it died. The skull is poorly preserved, yet it still has identifiable, distinctive traits. It has blunt, low-crowned teeth in the maxilla and dentary (upper and lower jaws), with those in the premaxilla being smaller but similar in shape. The teeth are loosely packed and not prominently curved. An ossified 'predentary' is present at the tip of the dentary. In Iteravis, Gansus, and hongshanornithids, which are otherwise anatomically similar, the teeth are longer, more curved, and more tightly packed.

There are at least nine cervical and seven caudal vertebrae, although some regions of the holotype are poorly preserved and incomplete. The forelimbs bear at least two manual unguals (hand claws). The pubis is slender and longer than the femur. The shaft of the pubis is mostly straight, with a dorsocaudal (up and back) curve at the end. In the closely related Gansus and Iteravis, the pubis is more gradually curved along its length. The tarsometatarsus is longer than the tibiotarsus, which is longer than the femur. The third pedal digit (toe) is the longest, followed by the fourth, then the second, which is much shorter than the others. The pedal unguals are straight on their ventral surfaces.

=== Paleobiology ===
The lower part of the hindlimbs is generally elongate compared to other Mesozoic avialans, especially the foot. These proportions, in addition to the lateral compression of the end of the tarsometatarsus and the high, recessed trochlea II, are similar to modern birds with a semiaquatic ecology. Gansus and Iteravis, two close relatives, have been interpreted as living in coastal or littoral (nearshore) regions, implying Khinganornis also preferred wading in a near-aquatic environment.

== Classification ==
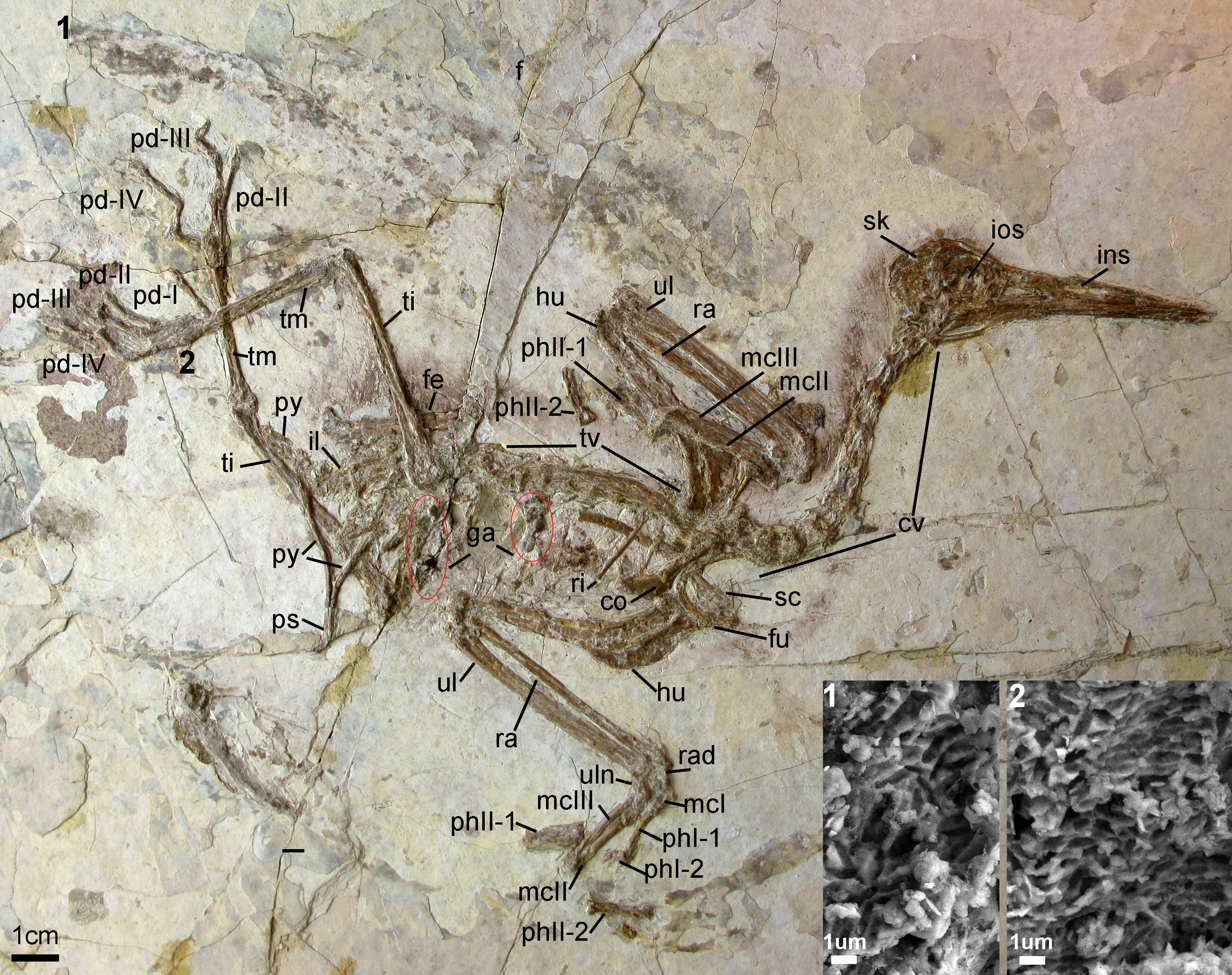
Fossil of the possible relative Changzuiornis

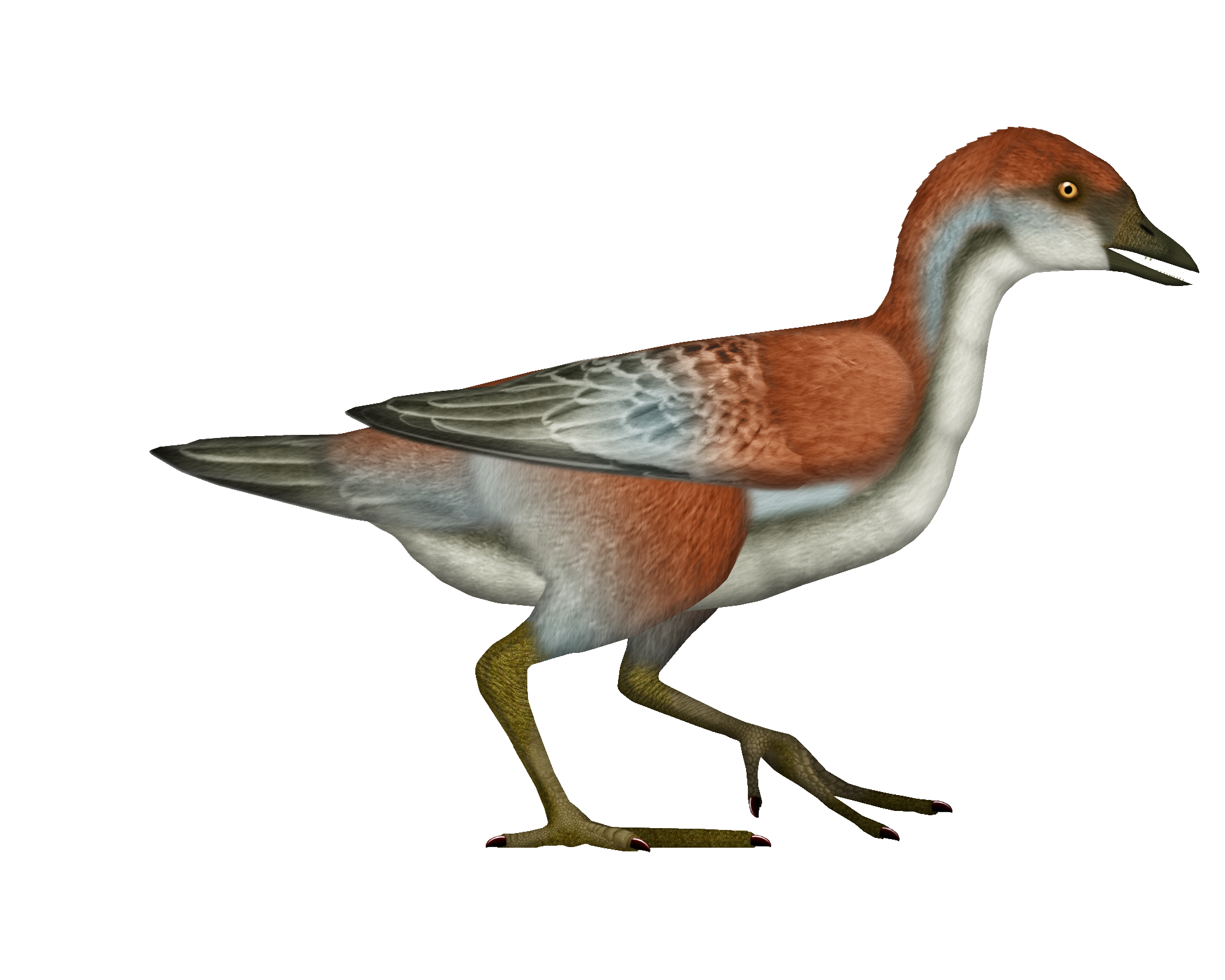
Speculative life restoration of the closely related Shuilingornis

In their 2020 description of Khinganornis, Wang and colleagues included it in a phylogenetic analysis using the matrix of Cau (2018). These results placed it within the Euornithes as the sister taxon to a clade containing Iteravis and Changzuiornis, with Gansus yumenensis diverging after these three genera. Similar results were recovered by subsequent authors using updated versions of Cau's matrix. Wang et al., 2025 (describing Shuilingornis from China's Jiufotang Formation) used an updated version of the original Khinganornis matrix recovered two contrasting tree topologies depending on the methodology used. With a K = 5, a clade was recovered with Iteravis as the earliest-diverging member, followed by Khinganornis, then Shuilingornis, with Changzuiornis and Hollanda as the most 'derived' members. Gansus yumenensis was recovered in a position diverging after this clade, reflecting the results of Wang et al. (2020). Using a K = 15, G. yumenensis was instead recovered as the sister taxon to Iteravis, in turn forming the sister group to the Khinganornis→Changzuiornis clade. since Gansus was a member of this larger clade, the family name Gansuidae could be used for it.

Huang and colleagues used the phylogenetic matrix of Cau (2024) in their 2026 description of Kunpengornis, another Jiufotang bird. Similar to the K = 5 results of Wang et al. (2025), Khinganornis was placed at the base of a Shuilingornis→Changzuiornis clade, although Iteravis moved crownward, as the sister to Gansus yumenensis. As such, the smaller clade containing G. yumenensis retained the name Gansuidae. These results are displayed in the cladogram below, with Gansuidae (following the strict definition) labeled, and 'gansuid-like taxa' highlighted, following the composition of the clade preferred by Wang et al. (2025).

- - †Archaeornithura
  - †Hongshanornithidae
  - - †Jianchangornis
    - - †Yanornithidae
        - - †Similiyanornis
          - †Songlingornis
        - - †Ambiortus
          - - †Yanornis
            - †Yixianornis
      - - - †Kunpengornis
          - †Piscivoravis
        - - - †Khinganornis
            - - †Shuilingornis
              - - †Changzuiornis
                - †Hollanda
          - - †Gansuidae
              - †Iteravis
              - †Gansus yumenensis
            - - Ornithuromorpha

'gansuid-like taxa'

== See also ==
- Beiguornis - another avialan from Pigeon Hill locality
- List of bird species described in the 2020s
