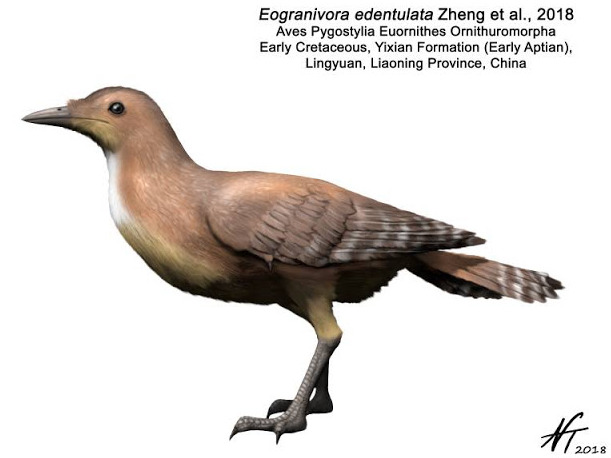

Scientific classification
- Kingdom: Animalia
- Phylum: Chordata
- Class: Reptilia
- Clade: Dinosauria
- Clade: Saurischia
- Clade: Theropoda
- Clade: Avialae
- Clade: Ornithuromorpha
- Genus: †Eogranivora

Type species
- †Eogranivora edentulata Zheng et al., 2018

= Eogranivora =

Eogranivora Temporal range: Early Cretaceous 125 Ma

Extinct genus of dinosaurs

Eogranivora is a bird genus, belonging to the Ornithuromorpha, that lived in the area of present-day China during the Early Cretaceous. Its type species is Eogranivora edentulata.

In 2011, a bird fossil, specimen STM35-3 found at Dawangzhangzi, was referred to Hongshanornis. Subsequently, that genus was proven to possess teeth, while STM35-3 is toothless. Additional research showed that the latter represented a species new to science.

In 2018, the type species Eogranivora edentulata was named and described by Zheng Xiaoting, Jingmai Kathleen O'Connor, Wang Xiaoli, Wang Yan and Zhou Zhonghe. The generic name combines a Greek eos, "dawn", with Neo-Latin granivora, "group of seed eaters", in reference to the species being the oldest known seed-eating ornithuromorph bird. The specific name means "toothless" in Latin. Eogranivora was the first fossil bird species to have been named in 2018.

The holotype, STM35-3, was discovered in a layer of the Yixian Formation dating from the early Aptian, at about 125 million years old. It consists of a nearly complete skeleton with a skull, compressed on a plate and counterplate. The splitting of the slabs damaged the bones of the fossil. It is largely articulated. Extensive but vague remains of the plumage have been preserved as well as a crop with seeds and a stomach with gastroliths.

Eogranivora is a medium-sized basal ornithuromorph. The describing authors indicated a distinguishing combination of traits, in themselves not unique. Both upper and lower jaws are toothless. The front of the lower jaws is fused into a symphysis for a fifth of their length. The coracoid does not have a clear process to contact the side of the breastbone. The outer and intermediate rear processes of the breastbone are thin and project to the rear to the same level. The central xiphoid process at the rear of the breastbone is V-shaped. The first finger is short but robust. The pubic bone at its top has a triangular process pointing to above and the inside, at a third of its shaft length. The first metatarsal and the first toe are completely lacking.

Eogranivora was placed in the Ornithuromorpha, in a rather basal position in a polytomy, below the Hongshanornithidae but above Archaeorhynchus.

The combination of a crop with seeds—the first time for a Mesozoic ornithuromorph—a mass of small gastroliths and a toothless beak was seen as a specialisation to eat seeds. Ornithuromorphs which still possessed teeth were hypothesised to have been omnivores. The loss of the first toe would be an adaptation to a running lifestyle.
