= Andrea Cau =

Italian paleontologist

Andrea Cau is an Italian vertebrate paleontologist. He specialises in the study of dinosaur cladistics, in particular that of tyrannoraptorans. Cau has named over a dozen new species of extinct animals, including the controversial dromaeosaurid theropod taxon Halszkaraptor in 2017. He also reanalysed the theropod Balaur, placing it as a basal avialan (primitive bird) rather than a dromaeosaur, which it was previously believed to be.

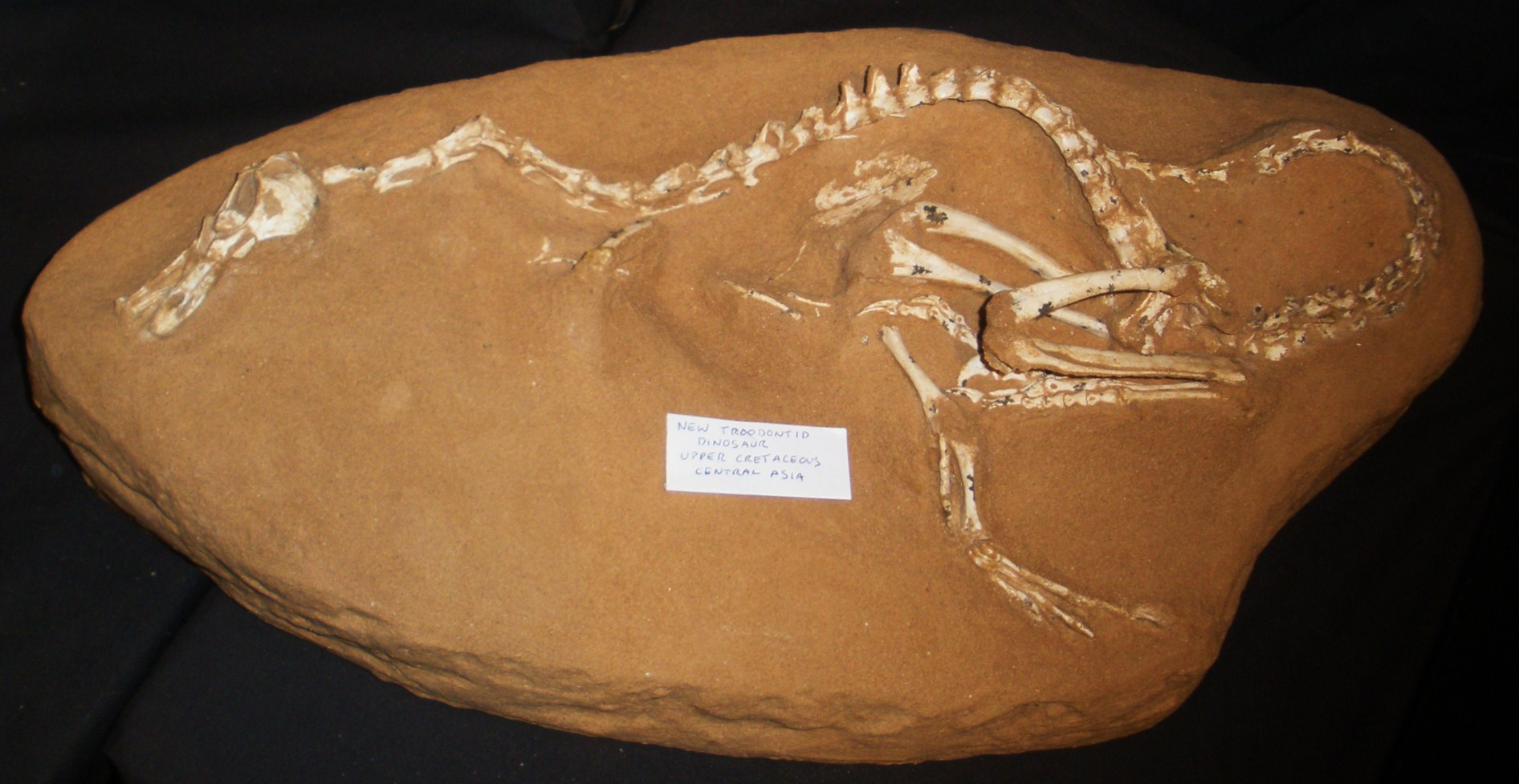
Halszkaraptor escuilliei fossil

Below is a list of taxa that Cau has contributed to naming:

Year	Taxon	Authors
2026	Norellraptor barsboldi gen. et sp. nov.	Wang, Ji, Cau, Kundrát, Liu, Wang, & Ji
2026	Carinthiasuchus kandutschi gen. et sp. nov.	Dalla Vecchia & Cau
2026	Kunpengornis anhuimusei gen. et sp. nov.	Huang, Wang, Cau, Mao, Liu, & Wang
2025	Shri rapax sp. nov.	Moutrille, Cau, Chinzorig, Escuillié, Tsogtbaatar, Ganzorig, Mallet, & Godefroit
2025	Shuilingornis angelai gen. et sp. nov.	Wang, Cau, Wang, Kundrát, Zhang, Liu, & Chiappe
2023	Migmanychion laiyang gen. et sp. nov.	Wang, Cau, Wang, Yu, Wu, Wang, & Liu
2022	Musivavis amabilis gen. et sp. nov.	Wang, Cau, Luo, Kundrát, Wu, Zhu, Guo, Liu, & Ji
2021	Khinganornis hulunbuirensis gen. et sp. nov.	Wang, Cau, Kundrát, Chiappe, Ji, Wang, Li, & Wu
2021	Ceratosuchops inferodios gen. et sp. nov.	Barker, Hone, Naish, Cau, Lockwood, Foster, Clarkin, Schneider, & Gostling
2021	Riparovenator milnerae gen. et sp. nov.	Barker, Hone, Naish, Cau, Lockwood, Foster, Clarkin, Schneider, & Gostling
2020	Kompsornis longicaudus gen. et sp. nov.	Wang, Huang, Kundrát, Cau, Liu, Wang, & Ju
2020	Huinculsaurus montesi gen. et sp. nov.	Baiano, Coria, & Cau
2017	Halszkaraptor escuilliei gen. et sp. nov.	Cau, Beyrand, Voeten, Fernandez, Tafforeau, Stein, Barsbold, Tsogtbaatar, Currie, & Godefroit
2017	Serikornis sungei gen. et sp. nov.	Lefèvre, Cau, Cincotta, Hu, Chinsamy, Escuillié, & Godefroit
2013	Aurornis xui gen. et sp. nov.	Godefroit, Cau, Dong-Yu, Escuillié, Wenhao, & Dyke
2013	Tataouinea hannibalis gen. et sp. nov.	Fanti, Cau, Hassine, & Contessi
2013	Sauroniops pachytholus gen. et sp. nov.	Cau, Dalla Vecchia, & Fabbri
2011	Samrukia nessovi gen. et sp. nov.	Naish, Dyke, Cau, Escuillié, & Godefroit
2011	Neptunidraco ammoniticus gen. et sp. nov.	Cau & Fanti

== Personal life ==
Cau graduated in 2017 with a PhD in Life, Earth and Environmental Sciences.

== Works ==
- La rivoluzione piumata. I nuovi dinosauri e l'origine degli uccelli, 5 volumes, self-publishing, 2019-2023.
- Ricostruire i dinosauri. La scienza che dà un volto ai fossili, self-publishing, 2024.
- Il dilemma dei dinosauri, Torino, Bollati Boringhieri, 2025.
