= Hongshanornithidae =

Hongshanornithids Temporal range: Early Cretaceous, 130.7–120 Ma

Scientific classification
- Kingdom: Animalia
- Phylum: Chordata
- Class: Reptilia
- Clade: Dinosauria
- Clade: Saurischia
- Clade: Theropoda
- Clade: Avialae
- Clade: Ornithuromorpha
- Family: †Hongshanornithidae; O'Connor, Gao & Chiappe, 2010

Type species
- †Hongshanornis longicresta Zhou & Zhang, 2005

Genera
- †Archaeornithura; †Hongshanornis; †Longicrusavis; †Parahongshanornis; †Tianyuornis

Extinct family of birds

Hongshanornithidae is an extinct group of early ornithuromorph birds from the early Cretaceous period of China. It includes the genera Hongshanornis (the type genus) and Tianyuornis from the Yixian Formation of Inner Mongolia, Longicrusavis from the Yixian Formation of Liaoning Province, Parahongshanornis from the Jiufotang Formation of Liaoning Province, and Archaeornithura, the oldest known member, from the Huajiying Formation of Hebei Province.

== Description ==
Hongshanornithids were small, approximately the size of modern phoebes. Their legs are proportionally long in comparison to the wings, suggesting that they were aquatic wading birds. They most likely lacked beaks and had teeth in their jaws.

== Classification ==
Hongshanornithidae was defined as a node-based clade including the last common ancestor of Hongshanornis longicresta and Longicrusavis houi plus all its descendants.

Beginning in 2012, several studies began to find that the hongshanornithids were more closely related to songlingornithids (yanornithiformes) than to other early birds, making them part of the same clade.
