= Xinghaiornis =

Xinghaiornis Temporal range: Early Cretaceous, 125 Ma

Scientific classification
- Domain: Eukaryota
- Kingdom: Animalia
- Phylum: Chordata
- Clade: Dinosauria
- Clade: Saurischia
- Clade: Theropoda
- Clade: Avialae
- Clade: Ornithothoraces
- Genus: †Xinghaiornis; Wang et al., 2013

Type species
- †Xinghaiornis lini Wang et al., 2013

Extinct genus of dinosaurs

Xinghaiornis is an extinct genus of toothless basal ornithothoracine dinosaur known from the Early Cretaceous Yixian Formation (Aptian stage) of western Liaoning Province, northeastern China. Xinghaiornis was first named by Xuri Wang, Luis M. Chiappe, Fangfang Teng and Qiang Ji in 2013 and the type species is Xinghaiornis lini. Xinghaiornis was prepared by Maureen Walsh at the Dalian Museum of Prehistory, Dalian, China.
