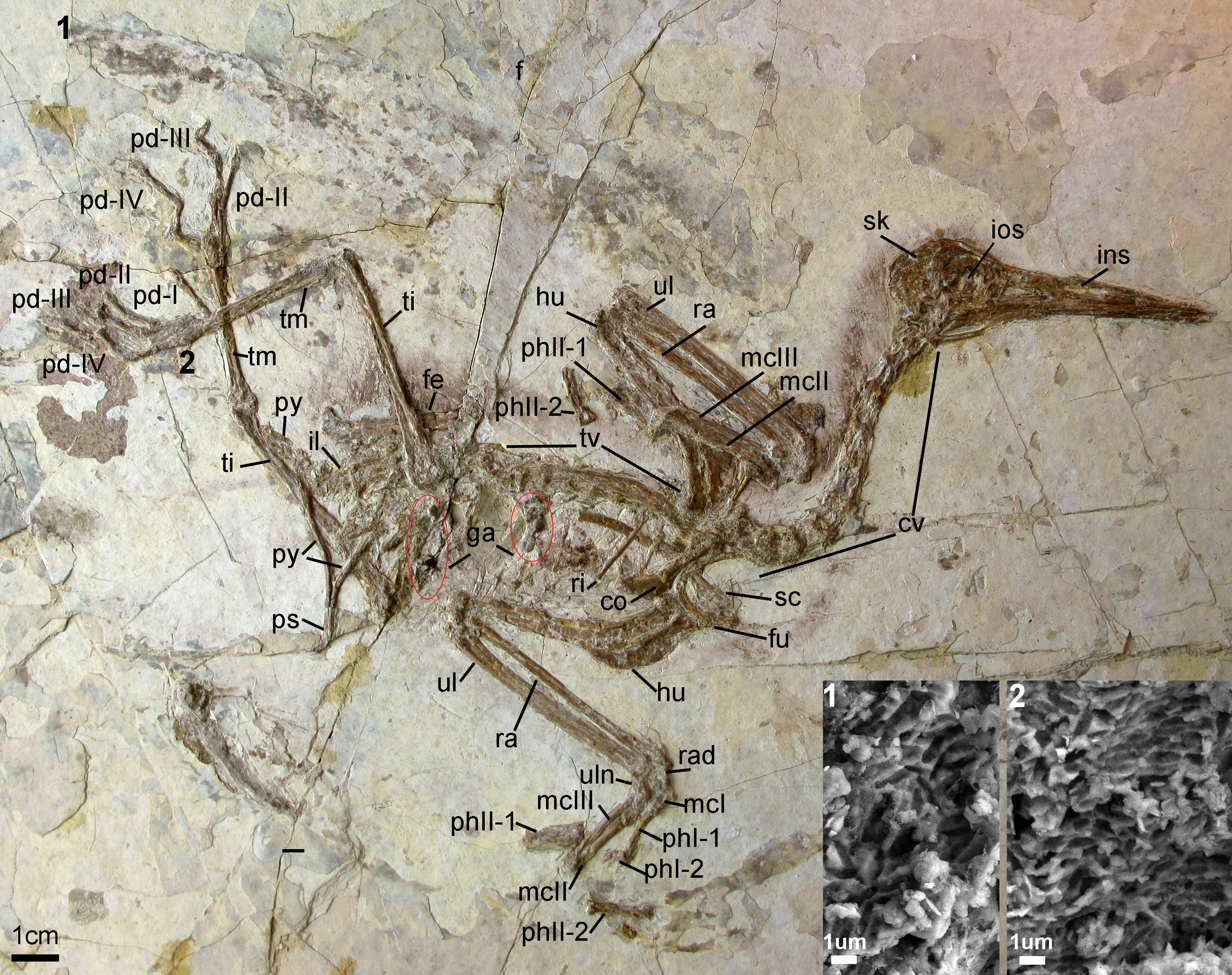
- Holotype specimen of Changzuiornis

Scientific classification
- Kingdom: Animalia
- Phylum: Chordata
- Class: Reptilia
- Clade: Dinosauria
- Clade: Saurischia
- Clade: Theropoda
- Clade: Avialae
- Family: †Gansuidae (?)
- Genus: †Changzuiornis; Huang et al., 2016

Type species
- †Changzuiornis ahgmi Huang et al., 2016

= Changzuiornis =

Changzuiornis Temporal range: 122.1 Ma

Extinct genus of birds

Changzuiornis is an extinct genus of ornithuromorph bird from the Early Cretaceous of present-day China. It contains a single species, C. ahgmi.

== Discovery and naming ==
At Sihedang near Lingyuan in Liaoning, a bird skeleton was excavated which was acquired by the Anhui Gushengwu Bowugan, the paleontological museum of Anhui. In 2016 the type species Changzuiornis ahgmi was named and described by Huang Jiandong, Wang Xia, Hu Yuanchao, Liu Jia, Jennifer A. Peteya and Julia A. Clarke. The generic name combines the Chinese chángzuì, "the longest", a reference to the long beak, with a Greek ὄρνις, ornis, "bird". The specific name is the Latin genitive of the acronym AHGM, the Anhui Geological Museum.

The holotype, AGB5840, was found in a layer of the Jiufotang Formation dating from the Aptian. It consists of an almost complete and associated skeleton with skull, compressed on a plate. It preserves feather remains and gastroliths. It represents an adult individual.

== Description ==
Changzuiornis has an unusually long rostrum, (beak) which reaches 68% of the total skull length. They had many teeth, most of which were located on the bottom jaw, yet they were very small, considering this bird was on the way to modern evolution.

== Classification ==
Changzuiornis was placed in the Ornithurae. The describers suggested that Changzuiornis might be cogeneric to the closely related Juehuaornis found in the same formation, in which case the latter genus would have priority.

== See also ==
- Dinosaur coloration
