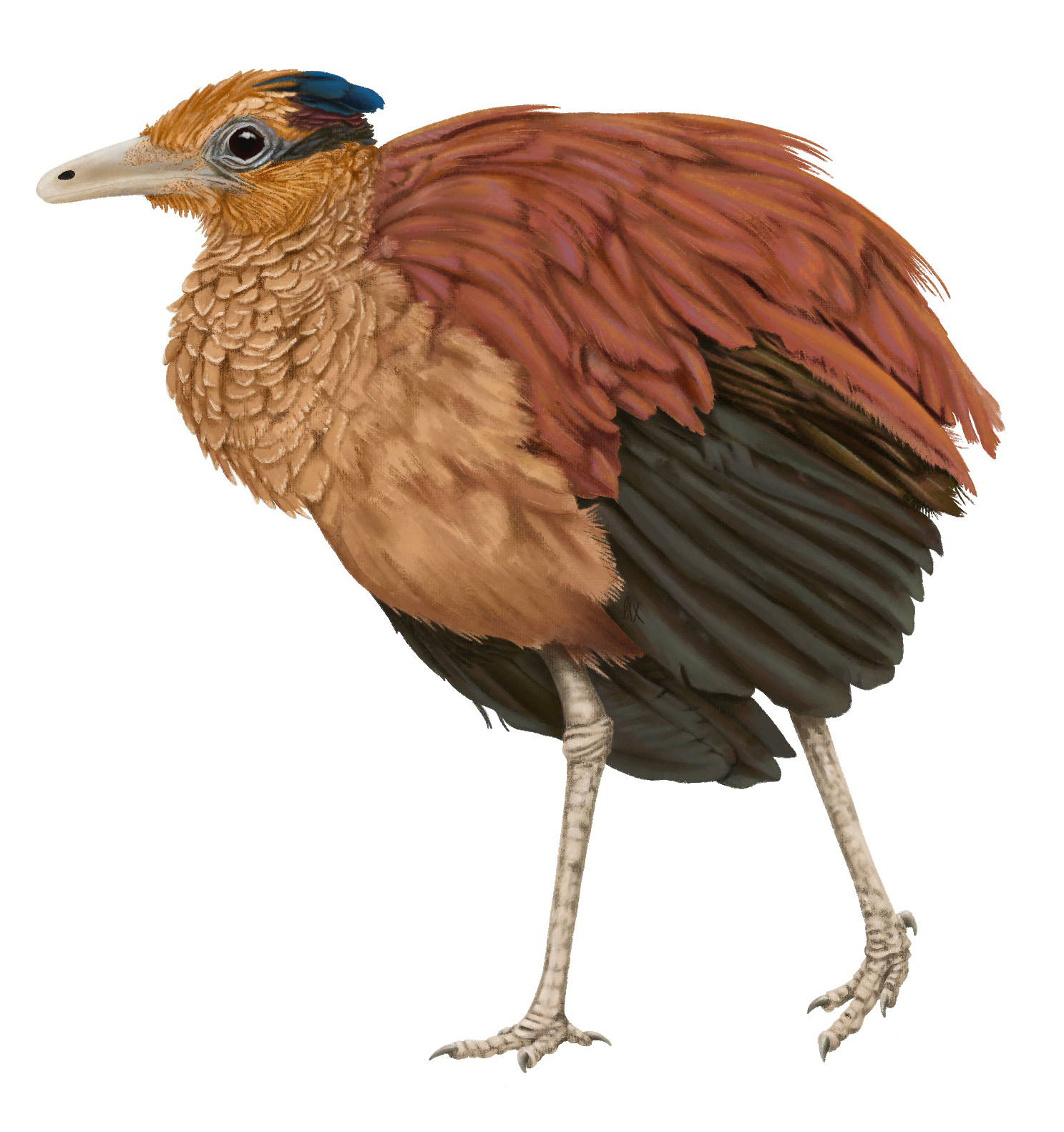
- Reconstruction of Hollanda luceria.

Scientific classification
- Kingdom: Animalia
- Phylum: Chordata
- Class: Reptilia
- Clade: Dinosauria
- Clade: Saurischia
- Clade: Theropoda
- Clade: Avialae
- Clade: Pygostylia
- Clade: Ornithothoraces
- Genus: †Hollanda; Bell et al., 2010
- Species: †H. luceria

Binomial name
- †Hollanda luceria Bell et al., 2010

= Hollanda luceria =

Hollanda luceria Temporal range: Late Cretaceous, 75 Ma

Extinct species of dinosaur

Hollanda is a genus of small ground birds known from fossils found in the Barun Goyot Formation of Mongolia. Found at Khermeen Tsav, it dates from the late Cretaceous period (Campanian stage), about 75 million years ago. Known only from partial hind limbs, Hollanda has long legs with an unusual configuration of the toes. These indicate that it was a fast-running ground bird, possibly similar to the modern Roadrunner. Its relationships are uncertain. Some studies have found that it was a relatively advanced bird, a member of the Ornithurae, related to birds like Ichthyornis. Other studies have recovered it as a member of the primitive family Songlingornithidae or 'derived' member of the family Gansuidae. A more expansive study found it as an enantiornithean. Dinosaur Institute at the Natural History Museum of Los Angeles County project lead and researcher, Alyssa Bell, named the new species after the Holland family (donors to the project) and the rock band Lucero.
