= Tianyuornis =

Tianyuornis Temporal range: Barremian-Aptian, 125.45–122.46 Ma

Scientific classification
- Kingdom: Animalia
- Phylum: Chordata
- Class: Reptilia
- Clade: Dinosauria
- Clade: Saurischia
- Clade: Theropoda
- Clade: Avialae
- Family: †Hongshanornithidae
- Genus: †Tianyuornis
- Species: †T. cheni

Binomial name
- †Tianyuornis cheni Zheng et al., 2014

Genus of birds (fossil)

Tianyuornis is a genus of ornithuromorph birds from the Early Cretaceous period (Barremian to Aptian stages). Tianyuornis was unearthed from lake deposits in the Yixian Formation of Inner Mongolia, China. Tianyuornis, like its other relatives, was similar in size to modern phoebes.

A nearly complete and articulated subadult individual has been recovered from the Yixian Formation, this individual had a small body and elongate hindlimbs, features that are similar to other members of the family Hongshanornithidae. Tianyuornis however, also possesses several autapomorphies such as a straight dentary, and teeth that were preserved in the maxilla and mandible. The possession of teeth reveals new and important morphological information of hongshanornithids, as well as confirms the controversial presence of teeth of the members of Hongshanornithidae.
