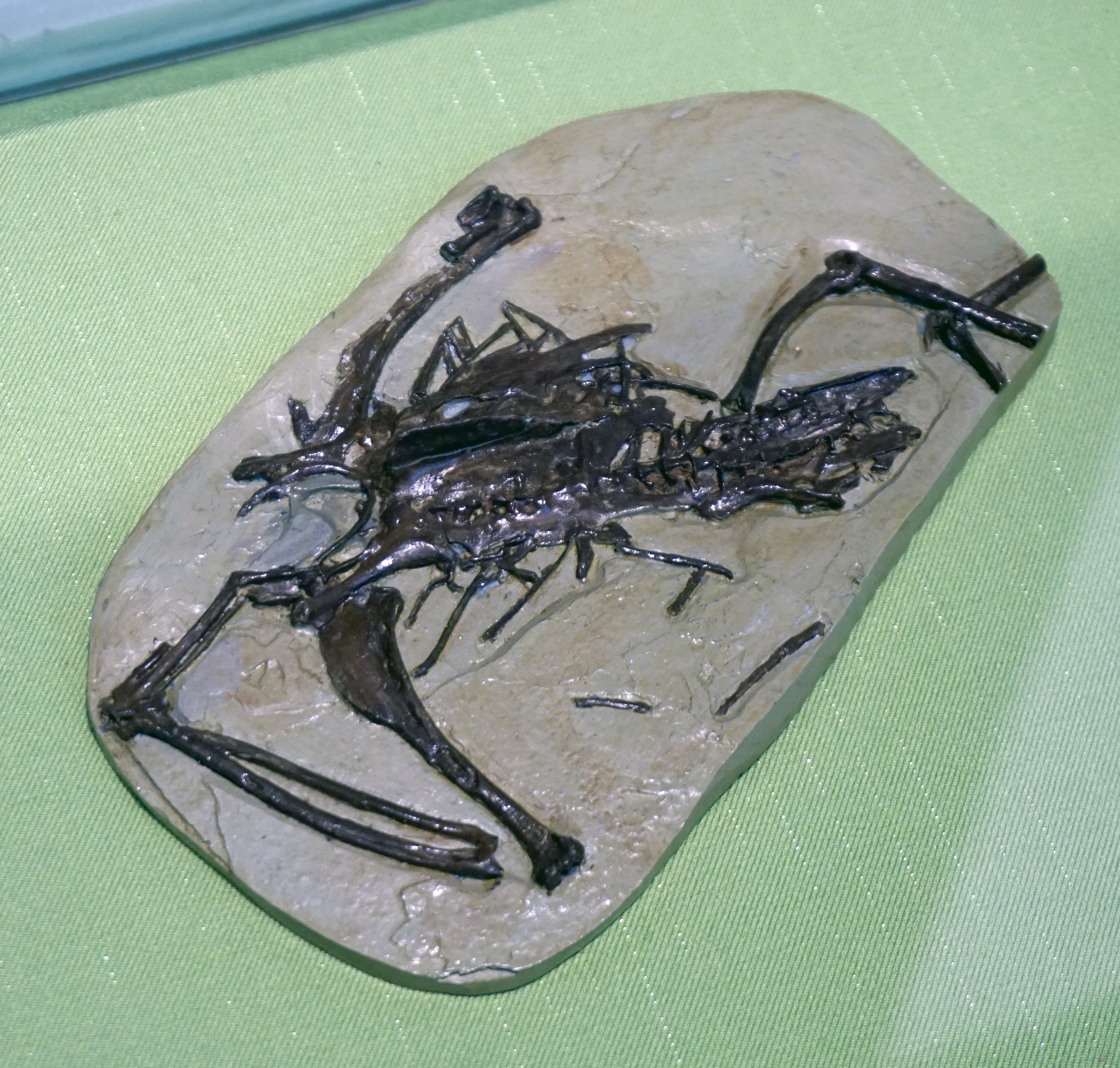
- Fossil specimen of G. yumenensis, the Gansu Provincial Museum.

Scientific classification
- Kingdom: Animalia
- Phylum: Chordata
- Class: Reptilia
- Clade: Dinosauria
- Clade: Saurischia
- Clade: Theropoda
- Clade: Avialae
- Family: †Gansuidae
- Genus: †Gansus; Hou & Liu, 1984

Type species
- †Gansus yumenensis Hou & Liu, 1984

Other species
- †Gansus zheni? Liu et al., 2014

= Gansus =

Gansus Temporal range: Early Cretaceous, 120 Ma

Extinct genus of dinosaurs

Gansus is a genus of aquatic avialans that lived during the Aptian age of the Early Cretaceous (Aptian-Albian) period in what are now Gansu and Liaoning provinces, western China. The rock layers from which their fossils have been recovered are dated to 120 million years ago. It was first described in 1984 on the basis of an isolated left leg. It is the oldest-known member of the Ornithurae, the group which includes modern birds (Neornithes) and extinct related groups, such as Ichthyornis and Hesperornithes.

== Description ==
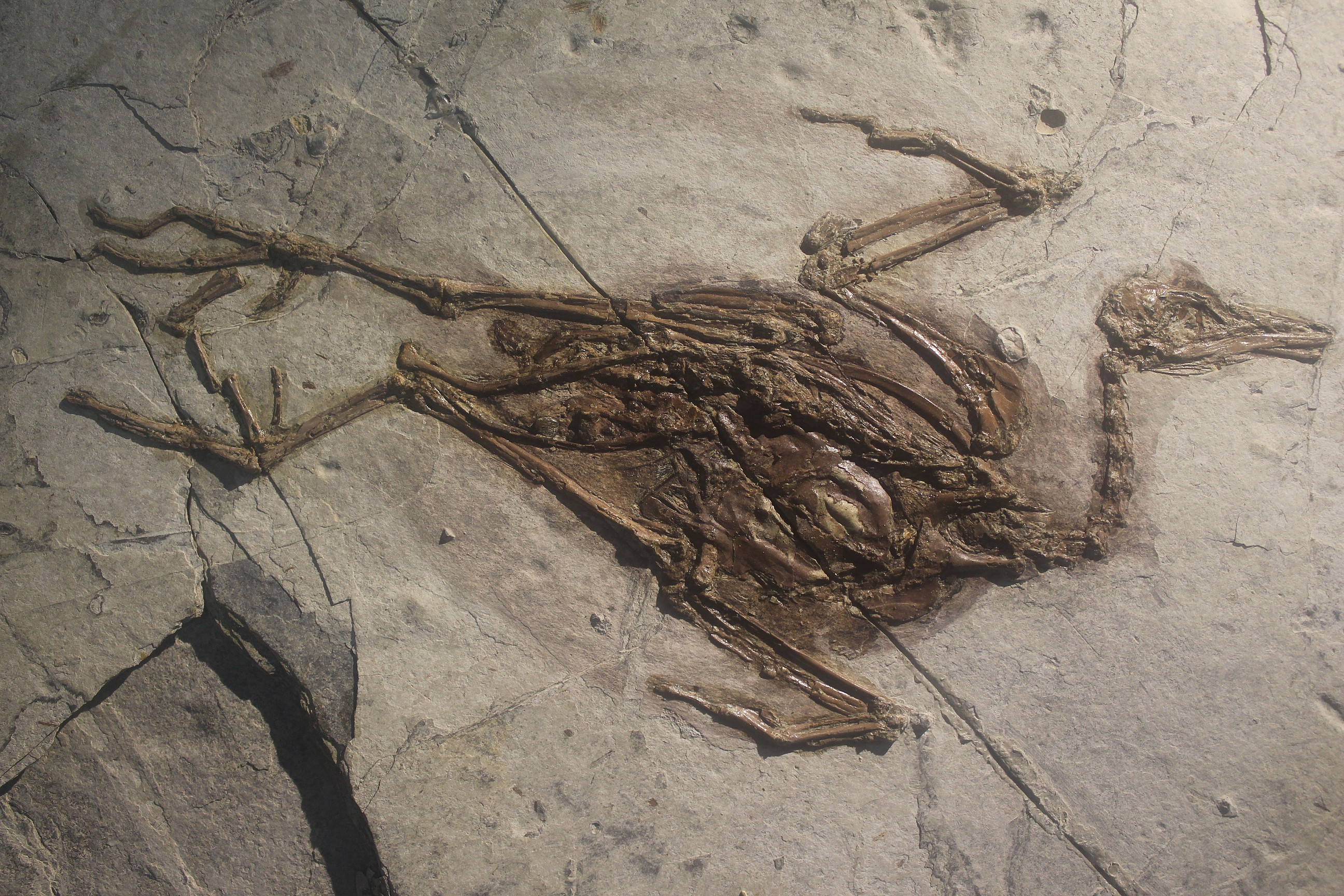
Fossil specimen of G. zheni, which is sometimes considered as a synonym of Iteravis, in the Beijing Museum of Natural History.

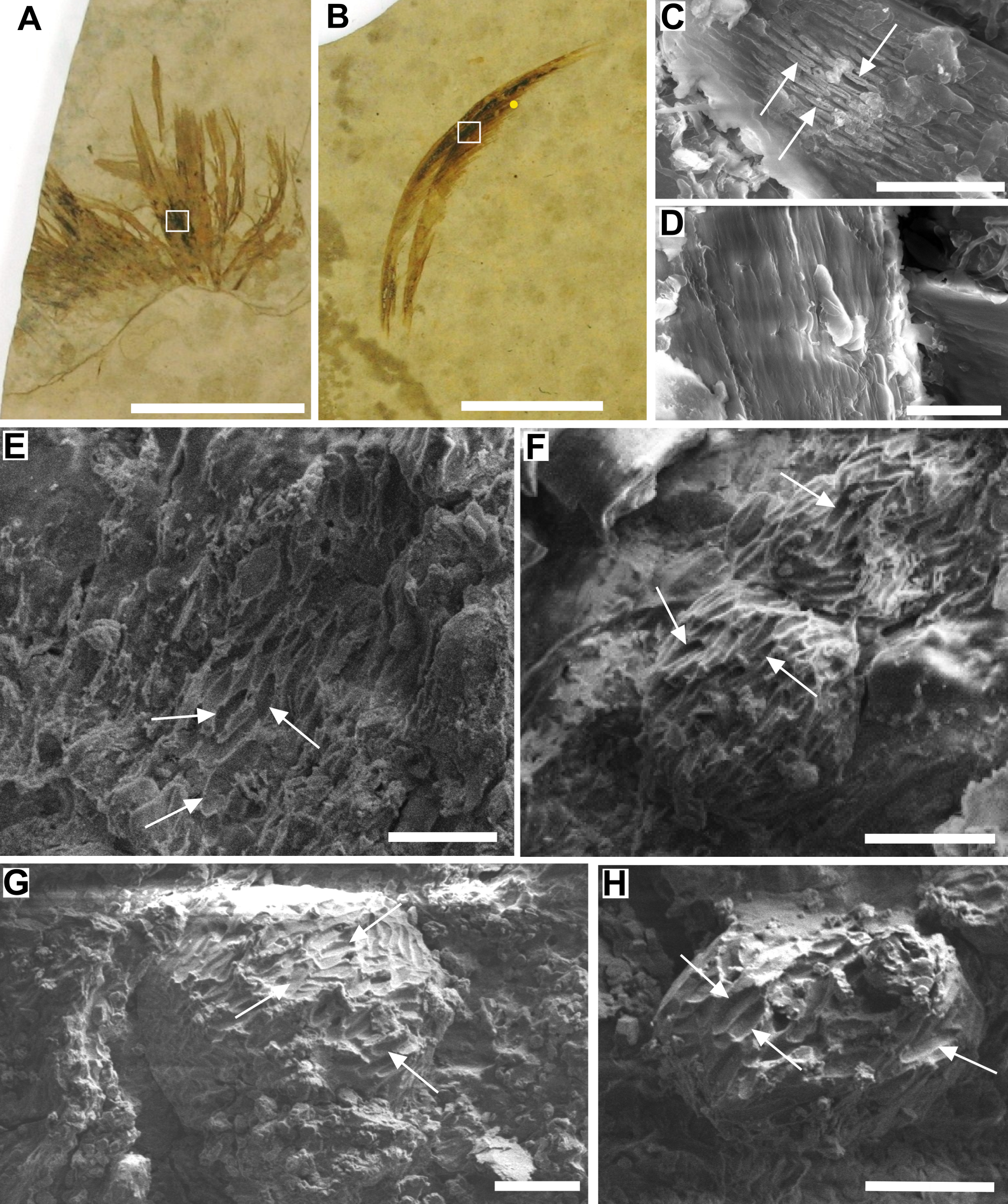
Images showing the presence of melanosomes in Gansus and extant (C, D) feathers

The genus Gansus originally contained a single species, G. yumenensis. In 2014, new species G. zheni is described, but some researchers consider this species to be a synonym of Iteravis huchzermeyeri. It was about the size of a pigeon and similar in appearance to loons and diving ducks. It had many features common among modern birds, and also retained some basal traits such as its clawed wings.

Gansus was discovered in the form of a single fossil foot in 1981. Five more well-preserved fossils were found in 2003–2004 in mudstone at the site of an ancient lake at Changma, Gansu; the geological stratum in which the fossils were found is the Xiagou Formation. Their bodies had settled in anoxic mud and were soon covered with further extremely fine silty sediments. Without oxygen, their remains resisted decay: these specimens preserved remains of flight feathers and traces of the webbing between their toes. In 2011, there were described nine additional specimens, that supported on the basis of a statistic analysis of the sternum and elements of the legs, the hypothesis that Gansus was a volant bird.

You et al. (2006) concluded that the anatomical characteristics of Gansus were similar to foot-propelled diving birds, such as Hesperornis (from the Cretaceous) and the loons (Gaviidae) and grebes (Podicipedidae). On the other hand, Li et al. (2011) concluded that Gansus showed a more similar morphology to ducks. Two years later, Nudds et al. (2013) showed that the pectoral limb length proportions of Gansus were most similar to swifts and hummingbirds (Apodiformes), while the pelvic limb length proportions fell within the modern birds (Neornithes), showing similarities with grebes (Podicipedidae), albatross (Diomedeidae) and cormorants (Phalacrocoracidae), suggesting that Gansus was both volant and capable of diving to some degree using either foot-propelled or, perhaps, both its wings and its feet for underwater locomotion.

== Classification ==
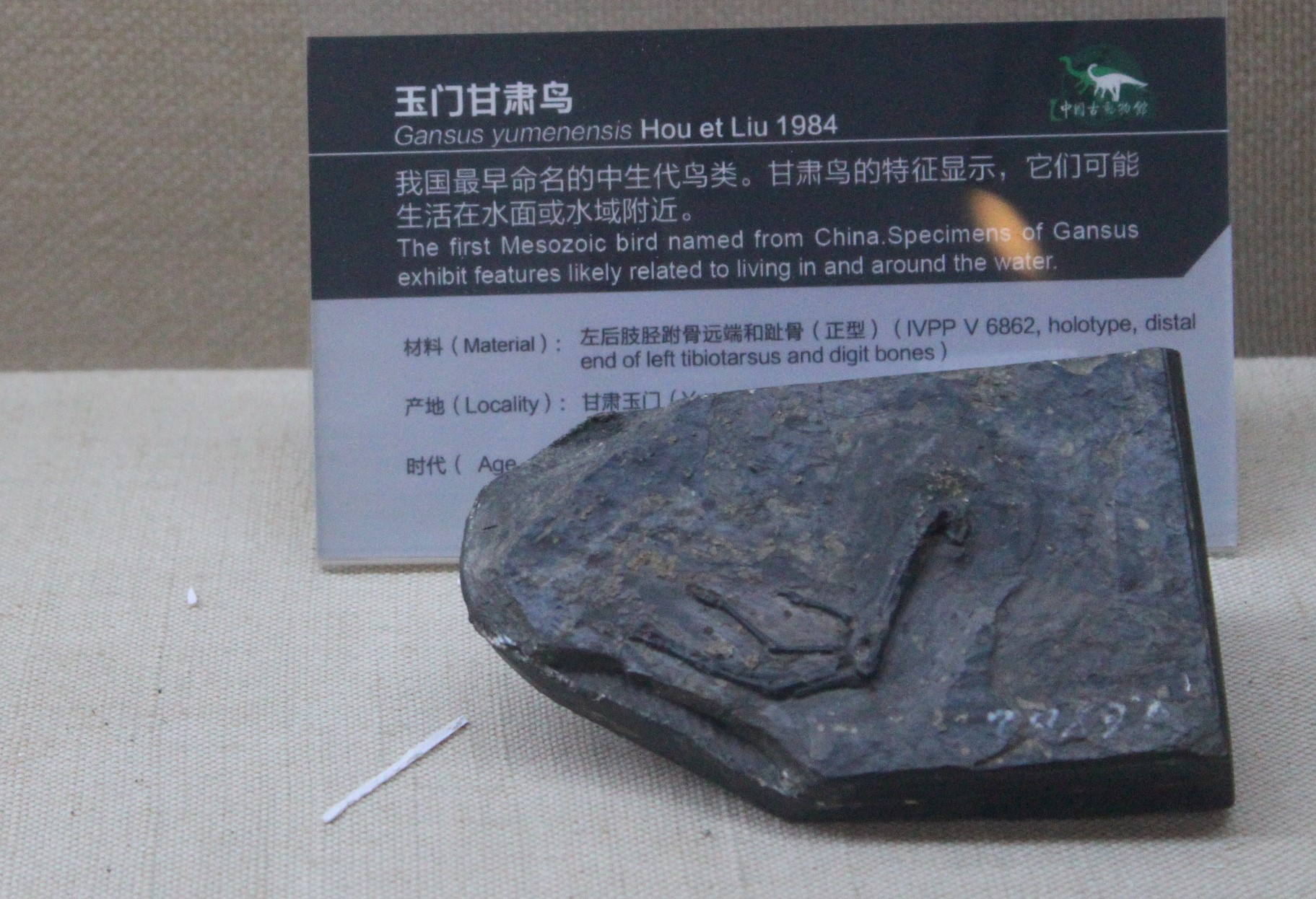
Holotype foot, Paleozoological Museum of China

Gansus was described as the oldest known ornithuran. The Ornithurae, however, has been given several very different definitions. In the definition used by You and colleagues (that is, the clade containing all living birds plus Hesperornis and Ichthyornis), Gansus is indeed the oldest known member. However, several birds from the older Yixian Formation and contemporary Jiufotang Formation are considered ornithurans under other definitions. Under any definition, all living birds, including taxa as diverse as ostriches, hummingbirds and eagles, are descended from basal ornithurans, many of which were semi-aquatic. It is now thought possible that all modern birds descended specifically from a semi-aquatic bird similar to Gansus. Thus, while Gansus is not necessarily a direct ancestor of today's birds, it is closely related to such an ancestral species. This hypothesis was corroborated by later phylogenetic studies that included this taxon.
