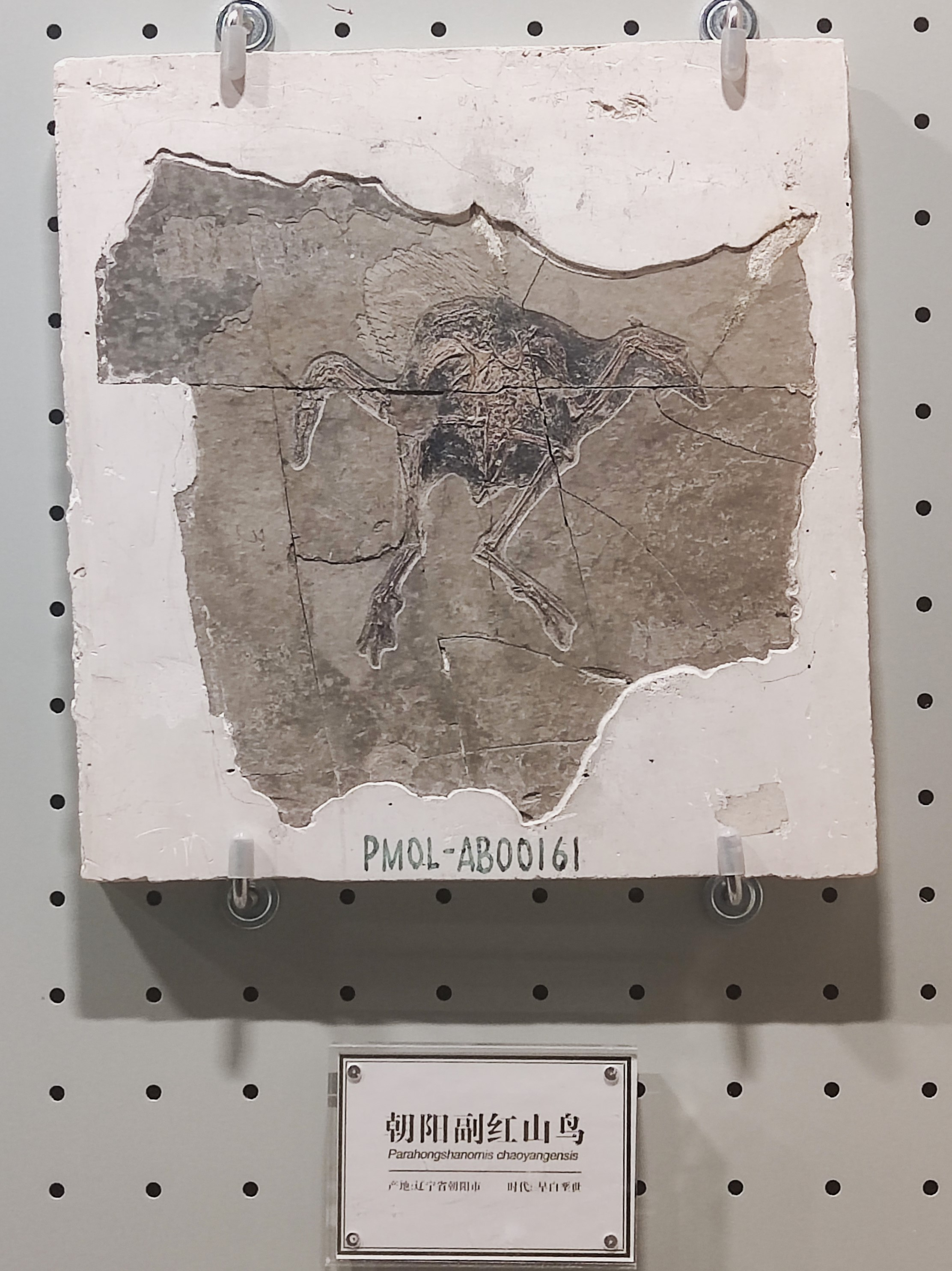
- Fossil in Liaoning Palaeontological Museum

Scientific classification
- Kingdom: Animalia
- Phylum: Chordata
- Class: Reptilia
- Clade: Dinosauria
- Clade: Saurischia
- Clade: Theropoda
- Clade: Avialae
- Family: †Hongshanornithidae
- Genus: †Parahongshanornis; Li et al., 2011
- Species: †P. chaoyangensis

Binomial name
- †Parahongshanornis chaoyangensis Li et al., 2011

= Parahongshanornis =

Parahongshanornis Temporal range: Early Cretaceous, 120 Ma

Extinct genus of birds

Parahongshanornis is an extinct genus of early bird from the lower Cretaceous (Aptian stage) of what is now Liaoning Province, north-eastern China.

Parahongshanornis was first named by Li Li, Wang Jingqi and Hou Shilin in 2011 and the type species is Parahongshanornis chaoyangensis. The generic name refers to an assumed close relationship with Hongshanornis. The specific name refers to Chaoyang.

Parahongshanornis is known from the holotype PMOL-AB00161, which was found near Yuanjiawa, Chaoyang, in the middle Aptian Jiufotang Formation of the Jehol Biota, about 120 million years old. It consists of a nearly complete and articulated skeleton missing the skull but showing remains of the soft parts of the body, including some feathering. Most of the vertebral column is obscured by the sternum and pelvis.

Parahongshanornis is a small species with a femur length of twenty-four millimetres. The furcula is U-shaped. The coracoid is elongated but with a broad end touching the sternum. The sternum has a keel over its entire length and two pairs of deep indentations at its back edge. The pubis is narrow and long with a distinctive pubic foot. The upper arm is somewhat longer than the lower arm. The sub-equal second and third metacarpals are fused to each other and the wrist, but the first is not. The first phalanx of the second finger is stout and short; the second phalanx is long and narrow.

Parahongshanornis was assigned to the Hongshanornithidae, based on comparative anatomy rather than a cladistic analysis. It would be the youngest hongshanornithid known.
