= Longicrusavis =

Longicrusavis Temporal range: Early Cretaceous, 122 Ma

Scientific classification
- Kingdom: Animalia
- Phylum: Chordata
- Class: Reptilia
- Clade: Dinosauria
- Clade: Saurischia
- Clade: Theropoda
- Clade: Avialae
- Clade: Ornithuromorpha
- Family: †Hongshanornithidae
- Genus: †Longicrusavis; O'Connor et al., 2010
- Species: †L. houi

Binomial name
- †Longicrusavis houi O'Connor et al., 2010

Extinct genus of birds

Longicrusavis (meaning "long shin bird" in Latin) is an extinct genus of basal ornithuromorph bird found only at Dawangzhangzi village in Liaoning Province, China. Longicrusavis was a ground dwelling carnivore, a wader, and part of biological family Hongshanornithidae, considered to have been a dominant species in the Jehol Biota, the prehistoric Chinese ecosystem which supported them. The name Hongshanornithidae refers to one of China's oldest recorded cultures in the region, the Hongshan culture.

== Description ==
Longicrusavis is a ground dwelling carnivore known from the holotype specimen PKUP V1069, found from the Lower Cretaceous Yixian Formation in Liaoning Province, China., which consists of shale slab and counter slab. The skeleton is nearly complete and belongs to an adult individual, with carbonized feathers preserved in full plumage with visible colouration around the head and forelimbs.

Like the closely related genus Hongshanornis, Longicrusavis has hindlimbs that are very long relative to the forelimbs. Longicrusavis has a rostrum that is more robust than that of Hongshanornis. The skull, though broken in the individual specimen, would be roughly triangular in shape with large eye socket orbits. In lateral view, the dorsal margin of the skull is slightly concave, but not as much as the dorsal margin of the skull of Hongshanornis, where there is an abrupt constriction at the rostrum.

Although no teeth are preserved, they were likely present in the upper jaw owing to the presence of alveoli, or tooth sockets, in the premaxilla and maxilla. Otherwise, Longicrusavis is one of the closest examples to a toothless bird with an evolving beak. Hongshanornis also appears to have alveoli, despite being described as toothless when it was first named. No alveoli are found in the mandible, indicating that it was likely edentulous. Longicrusavis exhibits an obvious long, thin, pointed beak.

Comparison of the tail feathers to another similar discovery, both possessing a long fan shaped tail improving flight, suggests these to be the oldest form of bird with this type of tail.

== Implications ==
Longicrusavis is important because detailed evidence of transitioning dinosaurs to birds are rare. Specimen PKUP V1069 also gives us, in conjunction with another palaeontological discovery five years before, evidence a range of small specialised birds from the early Cretaceous, 120-130 million years ago.

The holotype evidencing the discovery is held at the Beijing Institute of Vertebrate Paleontology and Paleoanthropology (IVPP) as part of a collection.

== Jehol Biota ==
The Longicrusavis fossil was part the Jehol Biota from which is unearthed a whole range of palaeontological finds including dinosaurs, mammals, birds, fishes and invertebrates. "The Jehol Biota never fails to stop giving, and the research to be done on these fossils is virtually endless!" said O'Connor who has determined at least three evolutionary stages to divide history based on the Dabeigou (130ma), Yixian (125ma), and Jiufotang (120ma) Formation periods issuing the Longicrusavis are the earlier Yixian and Jiufotang.
