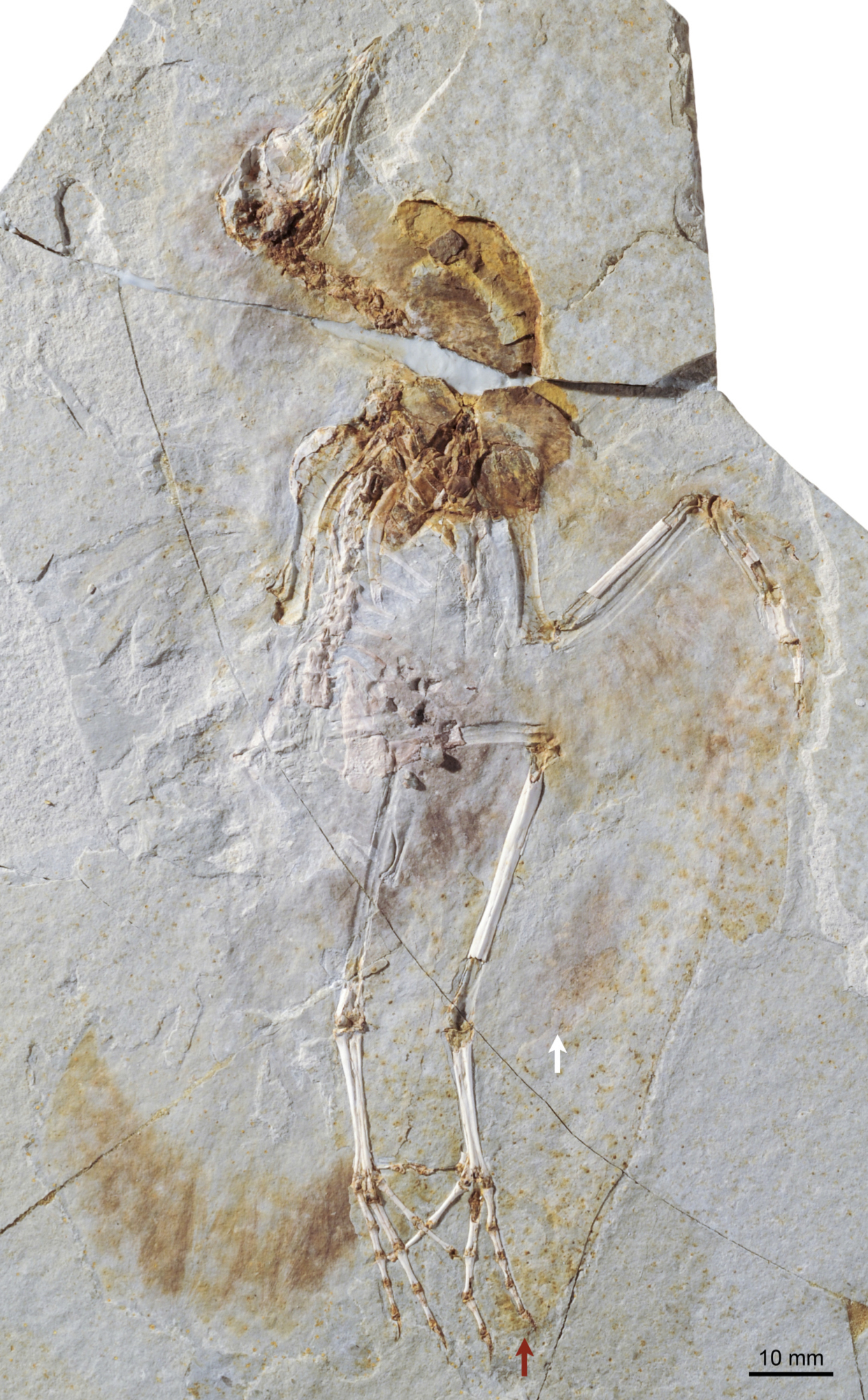
- Referred fossil specimen

Scientific classification
- Kingdom: Animalia
- Phylum: Chordata
- Class: Reptilia
- Clade: Dinosauria
- Clade: Saurischia
- Clade: Theropoda
- Clade: Avialae
- Clade: Ornithuromorpha
- Family: †Hongshanornithidae
- Genus: †Hongshanornis; Zhou & Zhang, 2005
- Species: †H. longicresta

Binomial name
- †Hongshanornis longicresta Zhou & Zhang, 2005

= Hongshanornis =

Hongshanornis Temporal range: Early Cretaceous, 124.6–122 Ma

Extinct genus of birds

Hongshanornis is a genus of ornithuromorph birds known from early Cretaceous lake deposits of the Yixian Formation, Inner Mongolia, China. The holotype specimen, recovered in 2005, is currently held by the Institute of Vertebrate Paleontology and Paleoanthropology in Beijing. It was found in the Jianshangou fossil beds, dated to 124.6 million years ago. Three additional specimens have been reported, though only one of those has been definitively identified as belonging to Hongshanornis. This latter specimen was found in the Dawangzhangzi fossil beds, which are about 122 million years old.

Hongshanornis is a member of the group Hongshanornithidae, to which it lent its name. It is closely related to Longicrusavis, which existed alongside Hongshanornis in the Dawangzhangzi ecosystem, and is very similar to the later Parahongshanornis from the Jiufotang Formation.

== Description ==
Hongshanornis longicresta was a small species, especially compared to other early ornithuromorphs (birds with a modern tail anatomy), about the size of a thrush, and adult specimens are estimated to have weighed about 50 grams (1.8 oz) in life, with a wingspan of about 320 millimetres (1.05 ft).

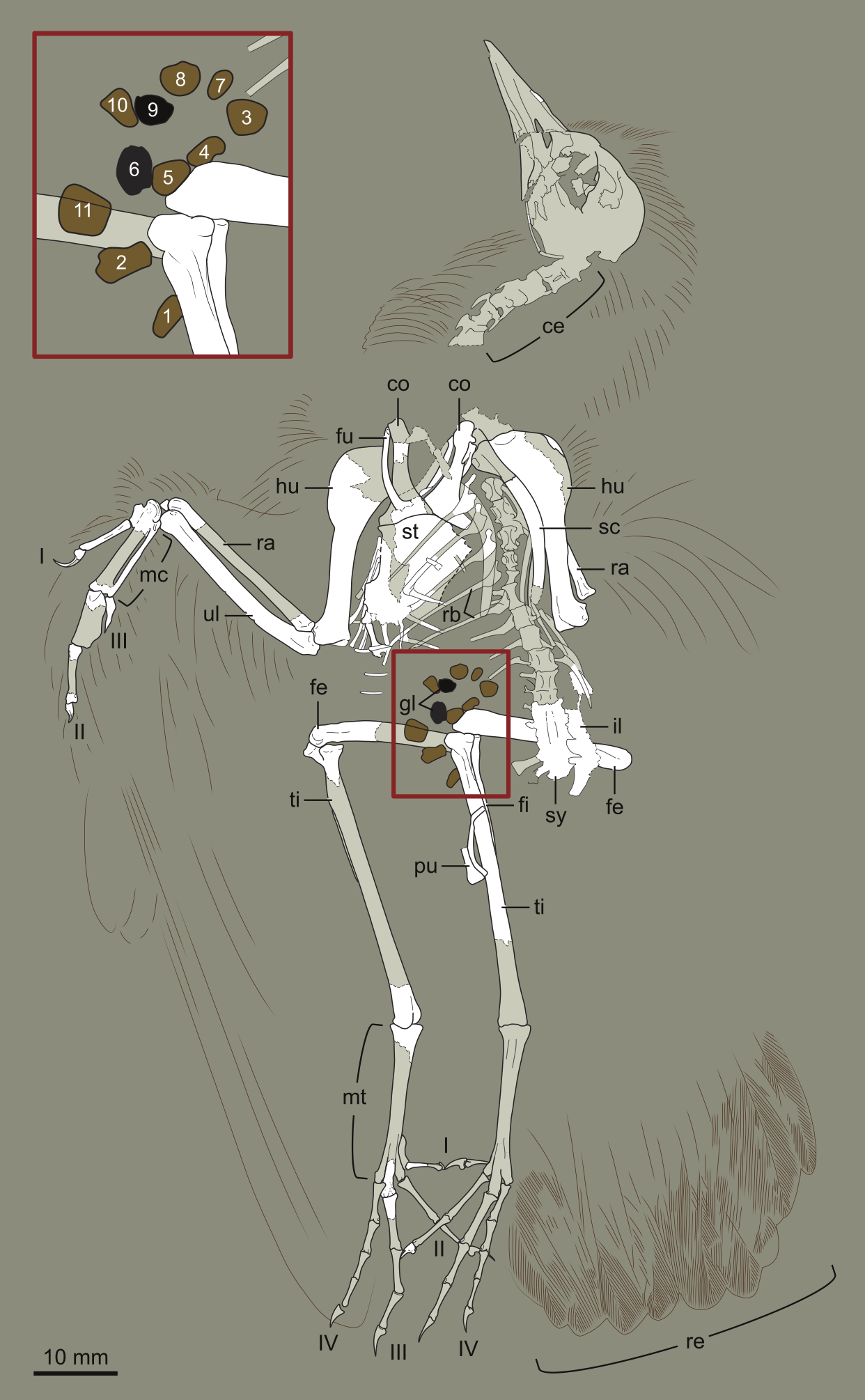
Interpretive drawing of specimen DNHM D2946, showing location of gizzard stones

The skull in all known specimens is poorly preserved, but in general appears to have had a narrow snout compared to the closely related Longicrusavis. The teeth were very small and are poorly preserved in all known specimens. At first, this led scientists to conclude that the teeth were absent in both the upper and lower jaws, probably replaced with a beak. However, later study of the type specimen showed that tooth sockets were present in the preserved parts of the jaw, and comparison with related forms showed that it did have teeth. The discovery of a more well preserved specimen confirmed the presence of teeth in at least the maxilla (middle of the upper jaw) and dentary (lower jaw). The snout appears to have lacked feathers, though whether it was only covered in skin or some parts bore a beak is currently unknown. The describers of Hongshanornis noted a unique bone in the end of the lower jaw which they equated with the beak-bearing "predentary bone" similar to the one found in ornithischian dinosaurs. Such bones have also been found in more advanced birds like Hesperornis. However, other scientists have pointed out that the "predentary" (or, technically, mandibular symphysial ossification) of Hongshanornis lacks the characteristic pits and grooves associated with the beak in early beaked birds like Archaeorhynchus, and that the presence or absence of any beak is unclear.

The original describers of Hongshanornis noted the apparent presence of a large feathered crest on the head, though the feather traces are poor quality and it may be an artifact of preservation. A second specimen from different fossil beds did not have long feathers on the head, but rather showed feathers which became shorter closer to the snout. In their 2024 description of the enantiornithine Neobohaiornis, Shen et al. noted a superficially crest-like arrangement of feathers at the top of the bird's head. They proposed that this (and similar arrangements in other compressed fossil birds like Hongshanornis) was the result of post-mortem taphonomic distortion.

The wings were long and broad, but tapered and pointed at the tips. The first few primary flight feathers were much shorter than the rest. The total wing area was 0.016 square meters. The wing digits bore small claws, with the claw on the first finger (the alular digit) much larger than that of the second finger (major digit). Hongshanornis is characterized by very long legs, with the lower leg (tibiotarsus) more than one and a half times longer than the upper leg (femur). The toes were long and thin, with small claws. The first toe (hallux) was very small, and the second toe was much shorter than the fourth. The third toe was longest.

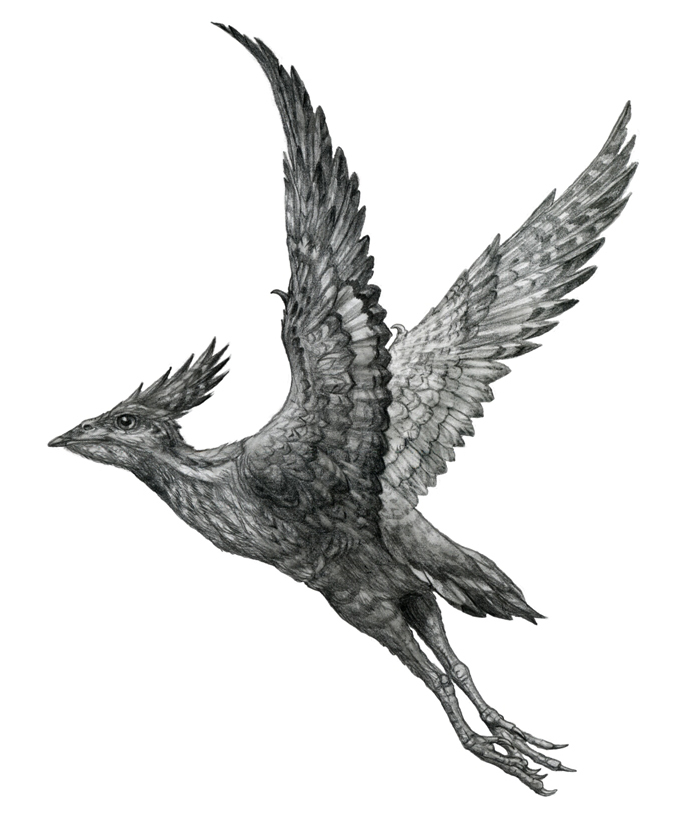
Life restoration with a speculative feather crest

The bones of the tail have not been preserved in any known specimen, but comparison with related species suggest it was short with a small, plowshare-shaped pygostyle bone, to which the tail feathers anchored. A mass of muscles, called the rectorial bulb, probably was present to control the fanning of the trail feathers. The tail feathers were long, with symmetrical vanes. There were at least 10 tail feathers (rectrices), more than in other primitive fan-tailed birds. The overall shape of the tail was rounded and wedge-shaped when viewed from above; due to the symmetrical feathers, the sides of the tail were probably not held fully fanned into the wind but swept back, forming a partially fanned wedge, as in some modern birds like accipiters, tyrant flycatchers and sunbitterns.

== Biology ==
=== Diet and ecology ===
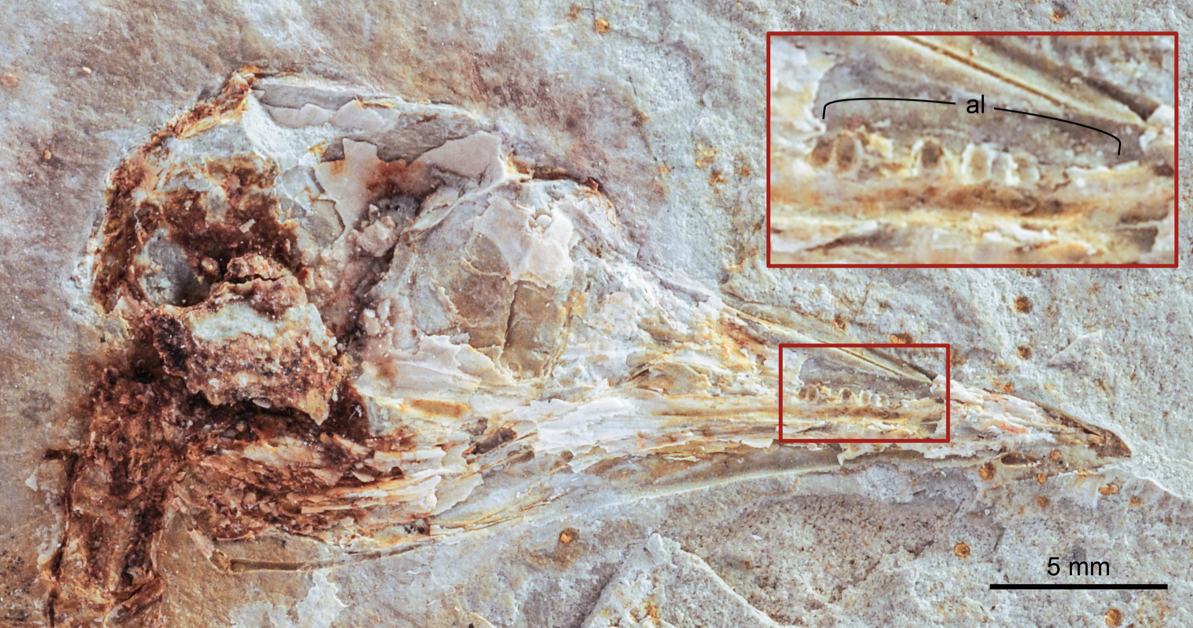
Skull of specimen DNHM D2945, highlighting teeth

Due to the assumption of toothlessness, hongshanornithids were originally interpreted as having a very specialized diet and ecology, perhaps as waders or shorebirds due to their slim snouts and long legs. However, the confirmation that they did in fact have teeth in both jaws has led to a re-interpretation of their ecological niche. Though still considered probably wading birds, they probably had a more generalized diet than previously assumed, with the different snout shapes present in different members of the group indicating niche portioning within a general wading ecology (Hongshanornis lived alongside the closely related Longicrusavis, and both were very similar to each other except for the shape of the snout). One specimen of Hongshanornis preserved several gizzard stones (gastroliths) of various sizes, which is usually an indication of an herbivorous diet. Another specimen originally assigned to the genus Hongshanornis preserved fossilized seeds in the crop; however, this specimen was subsequently transferred to a distinct taxon Eogranivora edentulata.

=== Flight ===
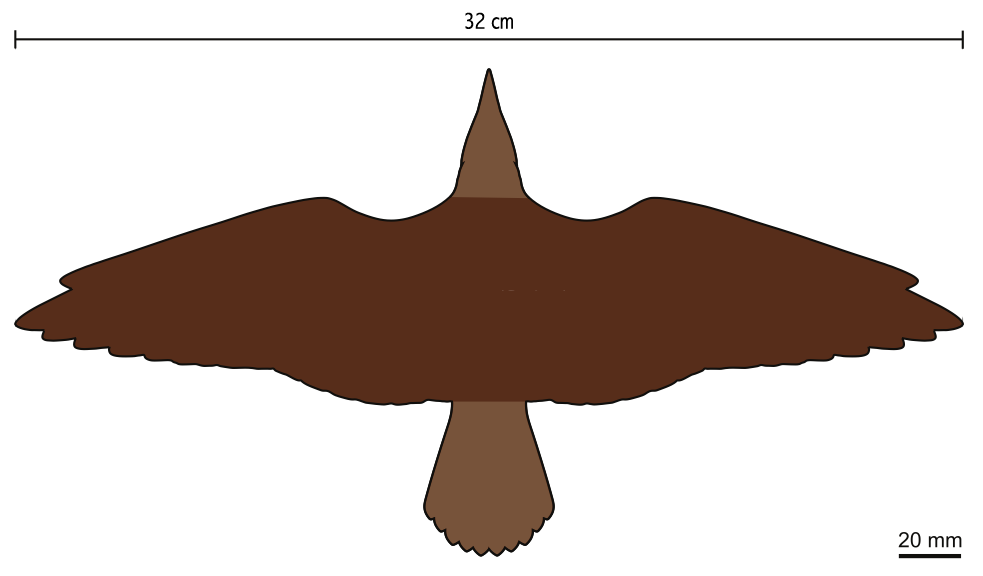
Diagram of the wing and tail profile

The wings of H. longicresta were broad and tapered, with an average wing area and wing loading compared to modern birds in the same size range. The presence or absence of slotting at the wing tips cannot be determined with known specimens, but modern birds with similar size and wing shape tend to lack wing slotting. The absence of wing slotting would suggest that Hongshanornis tended to fly mainly at relatively high speeds. Given the overall wing shape and comparison to modern birds, Hongshanornis probably flapped continuously when flying at lower speeds, and switched to bounding flight (rapid flapping alternating with periods of ballistic forward motion with the wings partly folded) at higher speeds. Overall, the wing and tail anatomy, and therefore probably flight style, of Hongshanornis was similar to many medium-sized passerine birds.
