= Heishanosaurus =

Heishanosaurus Temporal range: Aptian–Albian

Scientific classification
- Kingdom: Animalia
- Phylum: Chordata
- Class: Reptilia
- Order: †Choristodera
- Genus: †Heishanosaurus; Dong et al., 2020

Type species
- †Heishanosaurus pygmaeus Dong et al., 2020

Extinct genus of reptiles

Heishanosaurus is an extinct genus of choristodere reptile from the Early Cretaceous of China. The type and currently only known species is Heishanosaurus pygmaeus. It is unusual as it is much more primitive than other known choristoderes from the Early Cretaceous of Asia, and retains many plesiomorphic characters.

== Discovery ==
The type specimens are represented by the blocks IVPP V25322, 25323 and 25324, were discovered in September 2003 at the Badaohao locality, in Heishan County, Liaoning Province, China, in sediments belonging to the Shahai Formation. The Shahai Formation is generally thought to overlie the Jiufotang Formation and has an uncertain Aptian-Albian age, based on the radiometric dating of the Jiufotang Formation. The remains are disarticulated inside the blocks, and were scanned using microcomputed tomography.

== Description ==
Remains include disarticulated skull bones, along with limited postcranial remains. Based on the size of the skull, the animal likely around 16 cm long, similar in size to Cteniogenys. The skull retains an open lower temporal fenestra, as in Cteniogenys, Coeruleodraco and neochoristoderes, but which is closed in the majority of Early Cretaceous Asian "non-neochoristoderans".

== Phylogeny ==
In a strict consensus phylogenetic analysis, it was recovered as a basal choristodere, more derived than Cteniogenys, but more primitive than neochoristoderes or the weakly supported clade containing all other Asian Early Cretaceous "non-neochoristoderans" with closed lower temporal fenestrae, which was informally named the "allochoristoderes" in the study. Heishanosaurus was recovered in a polytomy with the Late Jurassic Coeruleodraco, despite its much younger age.

- Choristodera
  - Cteniogenys sp.
  - - Heishanosaurus pygmaeus
    - Coeruleodraco jurassicus
    - - Neochoristodera
        - Ikechosaurus pijiagouensis
        - Ikechosaurus sunailinae
        - Tchoiria namsari
        - Tchoiria klauseni
        - Champsosaurus
          - C. gigas
          - C. albertensis
        - Simoedosaurus
          - S. lemoinei
          - S. dakotensis
      - "Allochoristodera"
        - Monjurosuchus splendens
        - Philydrosaurus proseilus
        - - Lazarussuchus
            - L. inexpectatus
            - Lazarussuchus sp.
            - L. dvoraki
          - - Khurendukhosaurus orlovi
            - Hyphalosaurus sp.
            - - Hyphalosaurus lingyuanensis
              - Shokawa ikoi
