= Tzaganosuchus =

Tzaganosuchus Temporal range: Upper Paleocene (Thanetian) 55.8–58.7 Ma

Scientific classification
- Kingdom: Animalia
- Phylum: Chordata
- Class: Reptilia
- Order: Crocodylia
- Family: Crocodylidae
- Subfamily: Crocodylinae
- Genus: †Tzaganosuchus; Efimov, 1983

Type species
- †Tzaganosuchus infansis Efimov, 1983

Extinct genus of reptiles

Tzaganosuchus is an extinct monospecific genus of fossil crocodile from the Gobi Desert of southern/southeastern Mongolia. The type and only known species for this genus, Tzaganosuchus infansis was discovered during a joint paleontological expedition conducted by the Soviet Union and Mongolia. That same expedition also described several other reptiles including several species of Shamosuchus and the archosauromorph genus Irenosaurus (originally named Tchoiria egloni). The prefix of the name "Tzaganosuchus" is a Mongol word derived from the locality where its fossils were first found: the Tsagan Khushu Quarry, which dates to the Paleogene epoch (Thanetian stratigraphic stage) and is part of the Naran-Bulak Formation. The suffix suchus is a Latin word for crocodile.

== Taxonomy ==
When it was described in 1983, along with a number of other reptile species, Tzaganosuchus was put in the subfamily Crocodylinae, which contains the genus Crocodylus and most of the extant crocodile species.

== Description ==
Based purely on its taxonomic location, it is clear that Tzaganosuchus is closely related to many modern crocodile species, such as the Nile crocodile, as well as several fossil species that have only recently (from the standpoint of geologic time) become extinct, such as Rimasuchus or Voay. Therefore, Tzaganosuchus must retain several traits common to these groups, such as the long, pointed snout, amphibious lifestyle, and so on.

== Distribution and habitat ==
Tzanganosuchus lived in the Gobi Desert during the Paleocene–Eocene Thermal Maximum, a time of increased temperature and humidity worldwide, that was most extreme during the last stages of the Paleocene. The time in which this crocodile lived also corresponds closely to the Gashatan age of Asian land mammals, which Tzangosuchus may have preyed upon.
