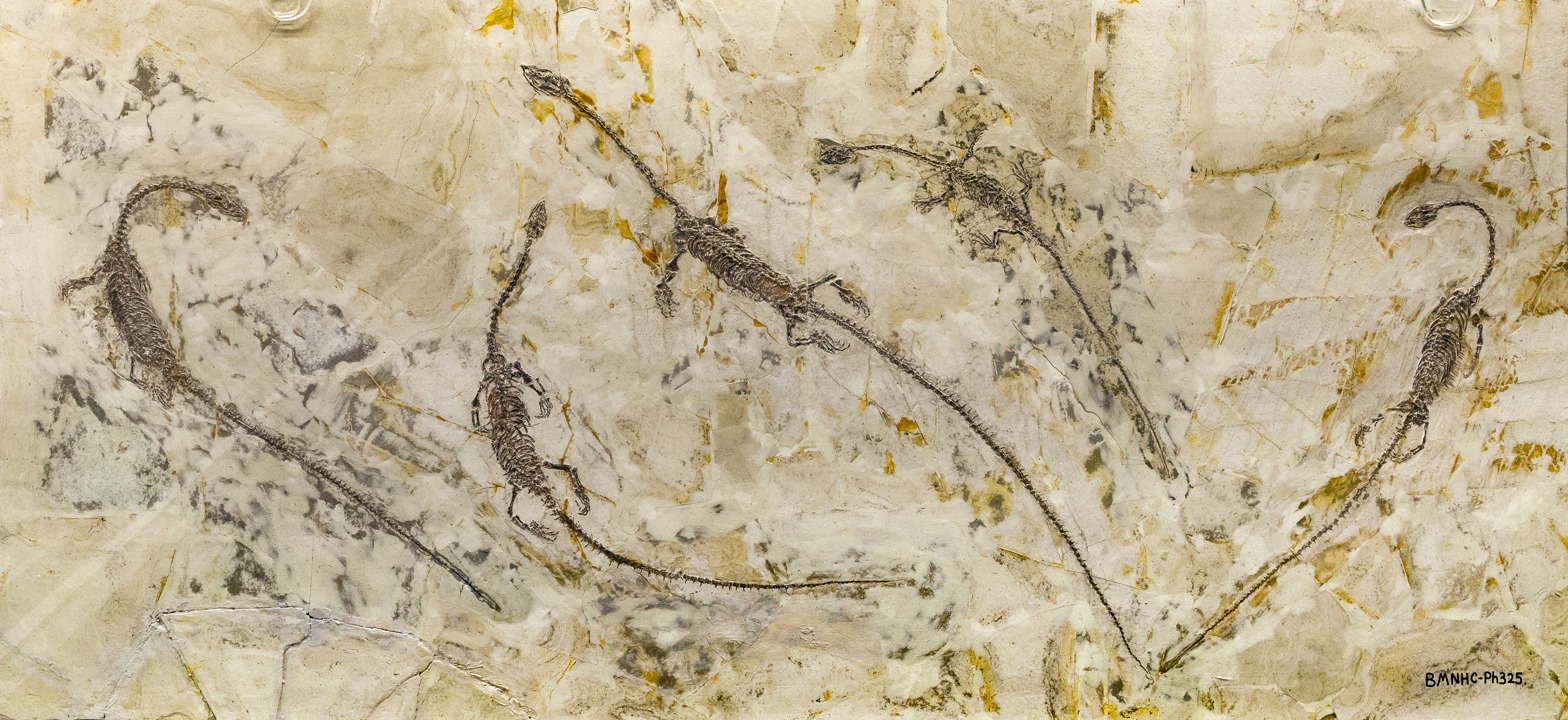
- Fossil specimen, on display at the National Museum of Natural Science

Scientific classification
- Kingdom: Animalia
- Phylum: Chordata
- Class: Reptilia
- Order: †Choristodera
- Family: †Hyphalosauridae
- Genus: †Hyphalosaurus; Gao, Tang & Wang 1999

Type species
- †Hyphalosaurus lingyuanensis Gao, Tang & Wang, 1999

Species
- †H. lingyuanensis Gao et al., 1999; †H. baitaigouensis Ji et al., 2004

Synonyms
- Sinohydrosaurus Li, Zhang & Li, 1999

= Hyphalosaurus =

Hyphalosaurus Temporal range: Early Cretaceous, 123–120 Ma

Genus of extinct freshwater aquatic reptiles

Hyphalosaurus (meaning "submerged lizard") is a genus of freshwater aquatic reptiles, belonging to the extinct order Choristodera. They lived during the early Cretaceous period (late Barremian to early Aptian age), about 123-120 million years ago. The genus contains two species, H. lingyuanensis from the Yixian Formation and H. baitaigouensis from both the Yixian and Jiufotang Formation of Liaoning Province, China. They are among the best-known animals from the Jehol Biota, with thousands of fossil specimens representing all growth stages in scientific and private collections.

== Description and biology ==
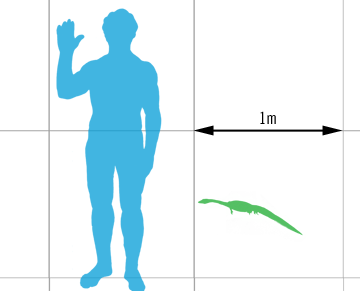
Size compared to a human

Hyphalosaurus fossils are relatively widespread in the Jehol beds, which represent a series of freshwater lakes. Several specimens of H. lingyuanensis and thousands of H. baitaigouensis specimens are known from the Yixian Formation, including entire growth series from embryos in eggs to fully grown adults. H. baitaigouensis was originally reported from the younger Jiufotang Formation, though subsequent study showed that the fossil beds it was found in might also belong to the Yixian Formation, specifically from younger rocks and a different region than H. lingyuanensis. However, a 2024 study confirmed the presence of H. baitaigouensis from the Jiufotang Formation. H. lingyuanensis and H. baitaigouensis were largely similar in anatomy, both achieved a maximum adult body size of about 0.8 metres (2 ft 7 in). They had small heads with numerous needle-like teeth, and extremely long tails with more than 55 vertebrae. The primary difference between the two species is the number of vertebrae in the neck. H. lingyuanensis had 19 neck vertebrae, while H. baitaigouensis had 26.

=== Skin ===
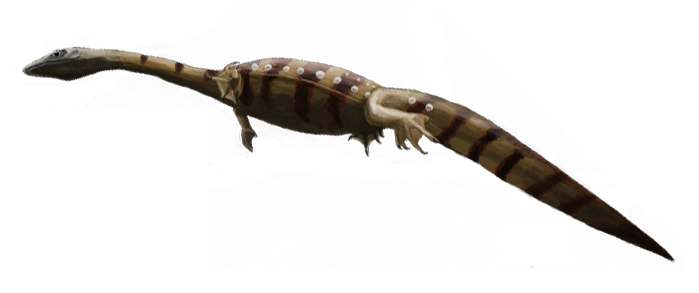
Restoration of H. lingyuanensis

Several specimens of Hyphalosaurus have been described with clear impressions of the skin. One specimen represents H. lingyuanensis, and another (with clearer impressions) cannot be assigned to a species because part of the neck (the length of which is a key indicator of species) was destroyed when fossil dealers grafted a skull from a different specimen onto the slab. However, both specimens show nearly identical patterns of scales.

Hyphalosaurus was covered mostly in small, irregularly patterned polygonal scales, though these varied across the body. The scales of the hind legs were smaller, finer and more irregular than those of the torso, while the scales of the tail were nearly square and arranged in more regular rows. In addition to the small scales, two rows of large, round scutes with shallow keels were along the sides. One row ran directly along the flank, with the other either slightly higher or lower and composed of scutes only 1/4 the size of the flank scutes. The flank row of larger scutes extended all the way to the base of the tail, and remained uniform in size across the entire row.

The tail itself has preserved soft tissue extending well beyond the margins of the skeleton. This, combined with the already flattened appearance of the tail vertebrae, suggests that a ridge of skin may have extended from the top and bottom of the tail creating a small fin. The feet and hands also appear to have been webbed.

A third specimen, attributable to H. lingyuanensis, was described in 2023, which preserves partial scales from most areas of the body. The preserved portion of the head scales were rhomboid in shape, while those of the neck were rectangular. The webbed nature of the feet was confirmed. The integument was considered comparable to that of crocodilians.

=== Reproduction ===
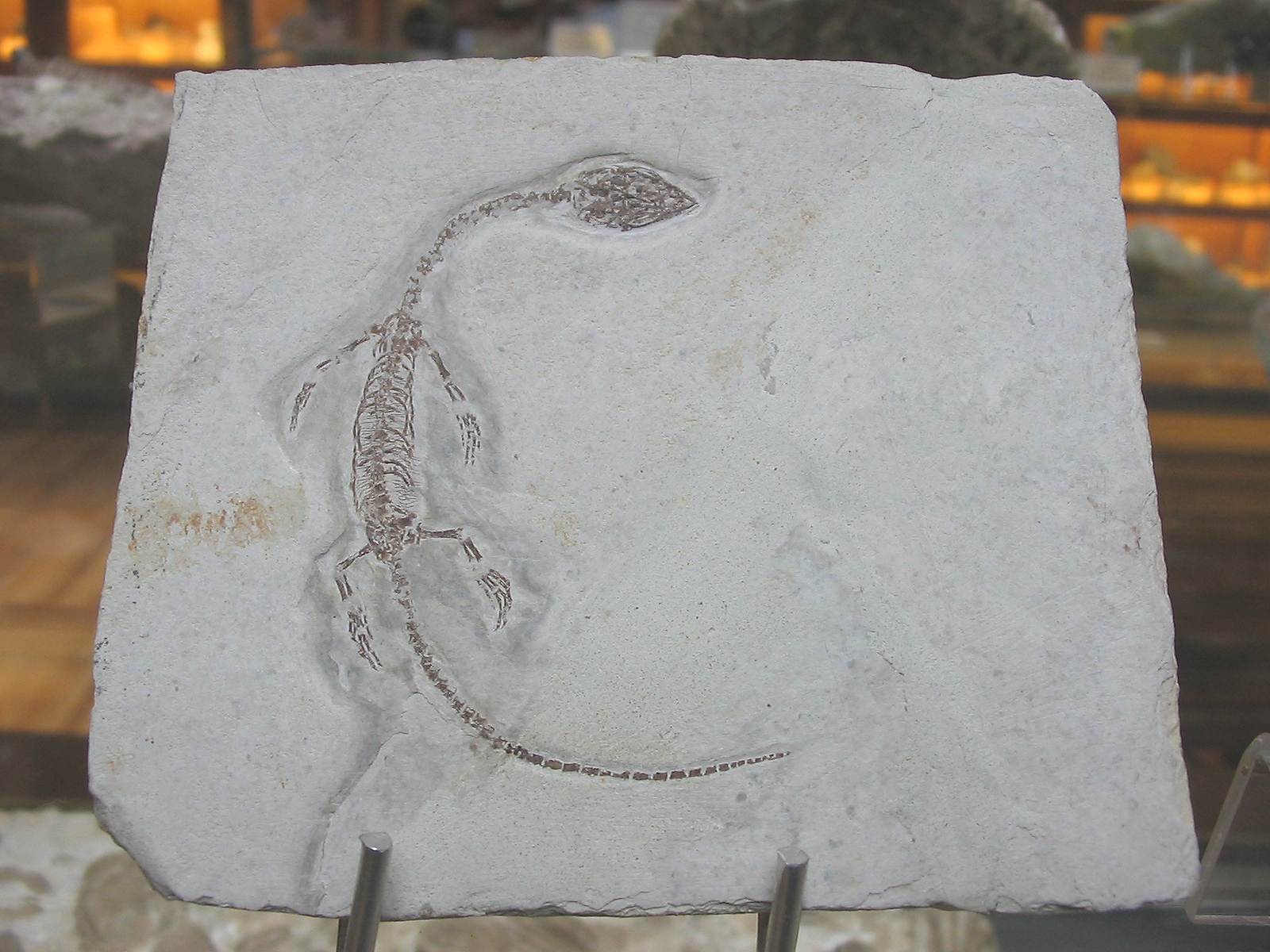
Juvenile H. lingyuanensis

Numerous embryonic and/or newborn specimens of Hyphalosaurus have been recovered from the Yixian Formation, dating 122 million years ago.

In the holotype specimen of H. baitaigouensis, several eggs containing embryos were preserved in and around the body. These eggs appeared to lack mineralized shells, which Ji and colleagues later interpreted as evidence that Hyphalosaurus gave birth to live young and that egg shells never fully developed inside the body of the mother. However, in 2006, Ji and colleagues re-examined the holotype specimen and noted clearly defined, though thin and leathery, shells. They agreed, however, that these eggs must have developed inside the mother which would later have given live birth (a reproductive method sometimes called ovoviviparity), but were likely expelled from the body when the mother died. Hou and colleagues (2010) also described several eggs with flexible shells, containing H. baitaigouensis embryos. These shells were soft, and more similar to the eggs of lizards than to those of crocodiles, but nonetheless possessed a thin mineralized shell.

Another fossil specimen of H. baitaigouensis, described by Ji and colleagues in 2010, appeared to be pregnant, containing 18 fully developed embryos arranged in pairs. One of the rear-most embryos was positioned in a reverse, head-first position, a complication which may have killed the mother. This confirmed that Hyphalosaurus and other choristoderans were viviparous, the only known Mesozoic fresh-water reptiles to give birth to live young.

In 2007, a two-headed embryonic or neonate individual of H. lingyuanensis was reported, the first recorded time that such a reptile has been found fossilized and the oldest known case of polycephaly.

== Ecology ==
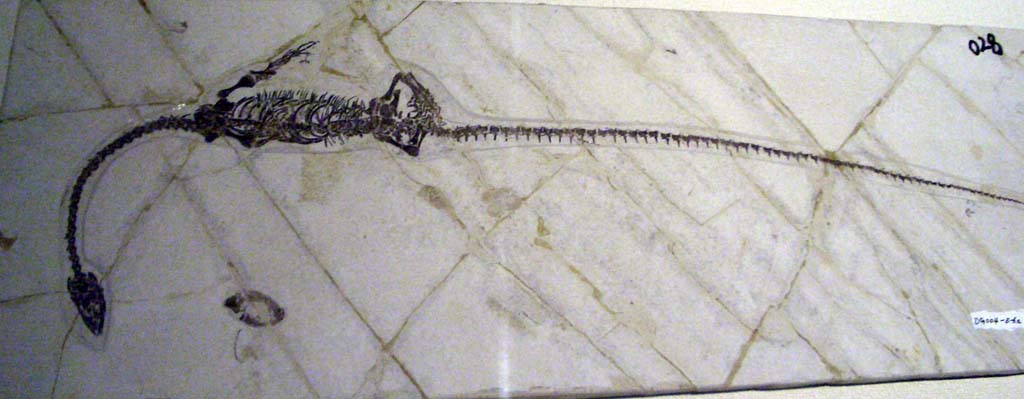
Fossil specimen of H. baitaigouensis

Both Hyphalosaurus species were aquatic, a lifestyle reflected by their long necks and tails and relatively small limbs. Superficially, they resembled miniature plesiosaurs, though this resemblance arose convergently and does not reflect a close relationship. Hyphalosaurus was among the most aquatically adapted choristoderans, with smoother, flatter scales than its relatives, a tall and flattened tail for swimming, a long neck and webbed feet. Because the torso was fairly inflexible and the limbs were not particularly adapted for aquatic life, Hyphalosaurus probably swam using mainly its tall, flattened tail. The chest was barrel-shaped and made up of thick, heavy rib bones which would have helped Hyphalosaurus stay submerged.

Hyphalosaurus appears to have exclusively inhabited deep-water lakes. All specimens are preserved in silt characteristic of the deepest part of the lake environment, and are often preserved alongside deep-water fish and crustaceans. Hyphalosaurus is also conspicuously absent from the aquatic sediments of the Jiufotang Formation, which preserved a more swampy, shallow-water ecosystem.

Hyphalosaurus is the most abundant tetrapod (four-limbed vertebrate) in the Yixian Formation, and probably played an important role in the aquatic food chain. Its long and highly flexible neck and small, flattened skull indicates that it captured small prey animals like fish or arthropods using a sideways-strike, similar to modern aquatic predators with flattened skulls. Unlike other choristoderans, Hyphalosaurus was likely an active predator, rather than one that used a "sit and wait" ambush strategy. Its fossils are often found preserved alongside the small fish Lycoptera, which may have been a prey item, and at least one specimen preserved fish ribs as stomach contents. However, the lack of preserved stomach contents among the thousands of known specimens may indicate that they ate mainly soft-bodied prey.

== Classification and species ==
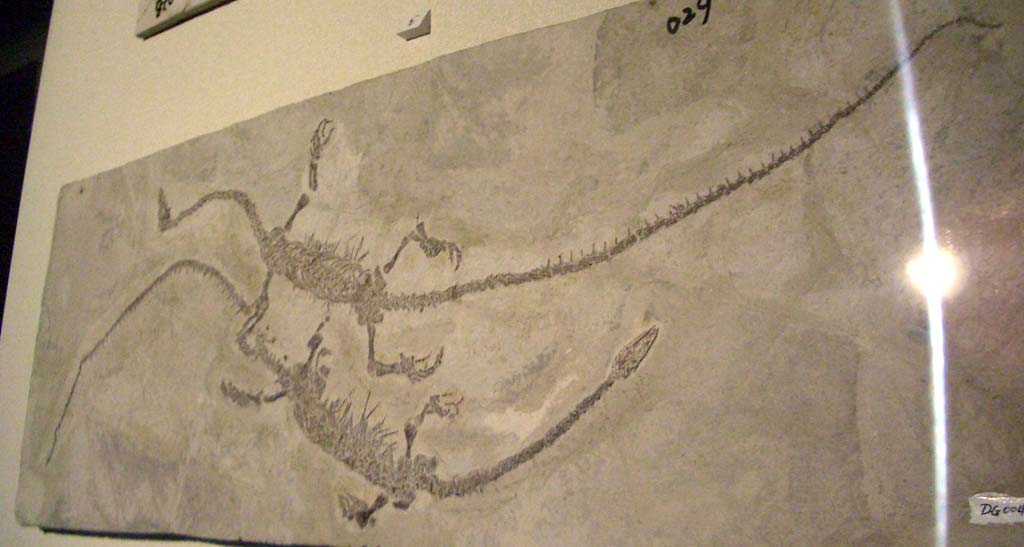
H. baitaigouensis fossils displayed in the Hong Kong Science Museum

The slab and counterslab of the holotype specimen of H. lingyuanensis were given to different groups of researchers in Beijing, one from the Institute of Vertebrate Paleontology and Paleoanthropology and the other from the Beijing Natural History Museum. Each team described the taxon and published their results independently in January 1999, giving the animal two different names: Hyphalosaurus lingyuanensis and Sinohydrosaurus lingyuanensis. It was quickly recognized that Sinohydrosaurus and Hyphalosaurus were mirror images of one another and in fact represented different halves of the same specimen. The ICZN, which governs the naming of animals, mandates that the older name is valid. However, in June 2001 paleontologists Joshua Smith and Jerry Harris noted that since both were published at almost exactly the same time, a third party needed to select which name would better serve as the objective senior synonym. Smith and Harris took the opportunity to do so, selecting Hyphalosaurus as the senior synonym because the manuscript for its description had apparently been submitted (though not published) earlier. They therefore made Sinohydrosaurus a junior synonym of Hyphalosaurus.

Hyphalosaurus is related to the large, crocodile-like Champsosaurus and the smaller, lizard-like Monjurosuchus. Its closest relative was the similarly built species, Shokawa ikoi, from the Early Cretaceous of Japan. The choristoderes were a clade of aquatic reptiles that survived the end-Cretaceous extinction along with crocodilians, turtles, lizards and snakes. The choristoderes became extinct by the Miocene.

Phylogeny from the analysis of Dong and colleagues (2020):

- Choristodera
  - Cteniogenys sp.
  - - Heishanosaurus pygmaeus
    - Coeruleodraco jurassicus
    - - Neochoristodera
        - Ikechosaurus pijiagouensis
        - Ikechosaurus sunailinae
        - Tchoiria namsari
        - Tchoiria klauseni
        - Champsosaurus
          - C. gigas
          - C. albertensis
        - Simoedosaurus
          - S. lemoinei
          - S. dakotensis
      - "Allochoristodera"
        - Monjurosuchus splendens
        - Philydrosaurus
          - P. proseilus
          - P. proseilus
        - - Lazarussuchus
            - L. inexpectatus
            - Lazarussuchus sp.
            - L. dvoraki
          - - Khurendukhosaurus orlovi
            - Hyphalosaurus sp.
            - - Hyphalosaurus lingyuanensis
              - Shokawa ikoi
