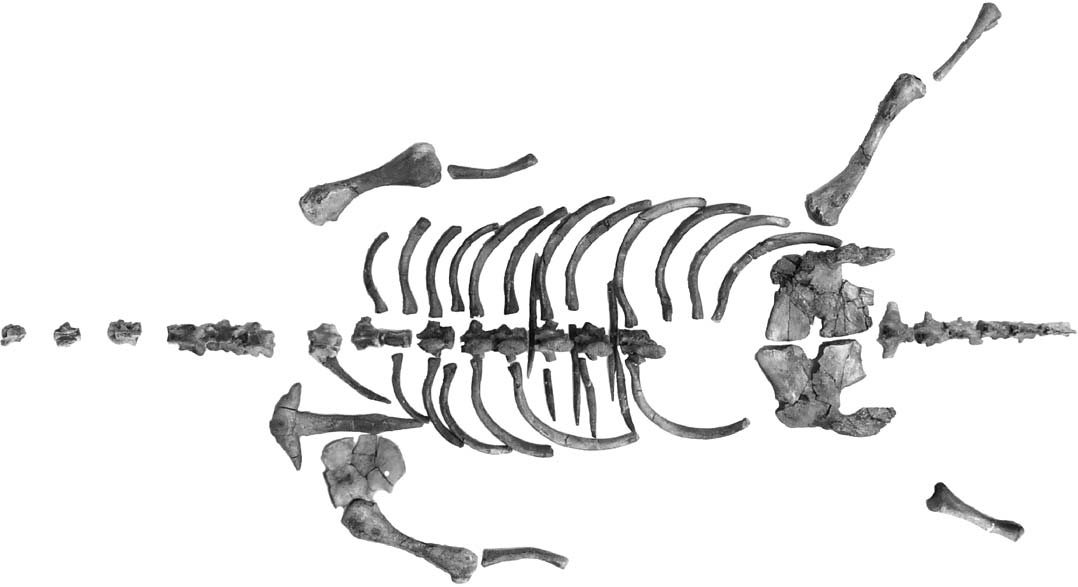
- Specimen MPC-MX 1/107, Khurendukhosaurus sp.

Scientific classification
- Kingdom: Animalia
- Phylum: Chordata
- Class: Reptilia
- Clade: Diapsida
- Clade: Neodiapsida
- Order: †Choristodera
- Genus: †Khurendukhosaurus; Sigogneau–Russell & Efimov, 1984

Species
- K. orlovi Sigogneau–Russell & Efimov, 1984 (type); K. bajkalensis Efimov, 1986

= Khurendukhosaurus =

Khurendukhosaurus Temporal range: Early Cretaceous, Aptian–Albian

Extinct genus of reptiles

Khurendukhosaurus is a genus of choristodere, a type of amphibious reptile. It is known from Lower Cretaceous rocks of Mongolia and Russia. Two species have been named. The type species, K. orlovi, was named in 1984 by Sigogneau–Russell and Efimov for the fragmentary postcranial skeleton PIN 3386/3. This specimen was discovered in the Albian-age Lower Cretaceous Khuren Dukh Formation Formation at Hüren Dukh, central Mongolia. The lake deposits at this site also contain fossils of the choristoderes Irenosaurus and Tchoiria. Other postcranial bones of K. orlovi have been found at this site as well.

Second species K. bajkalensis was named by Efimov in 1996 for PIN 2234/201, consisting of a scapulocoracoid and a rib. These bones were found in the Lower Cretaceous Murtoi Formation at Lake Gusinoye, Buryatia, Russia. The first Russian choristodere, Efimov and Storrs (2000) found it difficult to distinguish from K. orlovi based on the small amount of material. Skutschas (2008) reported on additional material which supported the placement of the Russian taxon within Khurendukhosaurus, but found the species K. bajkalensis to be dubious within the genus. An indeterminate species is known from the Batylykh Formation.

Khurendukhosaurus was a small choristodere, approximately 1 metre (3.3 ft) long at most. Efimov and Storrs regarded it as a basal member of Choristodera, but Skutschas was unable to confirm this in a phylogenetic analysis. It may have been related to the hyphalosaurids, a group of long–necked choristoderes. The neural spines of the tail are elongate, suggesting that it swam by using a tall tail. In 2019, another partial skeleton (MPC-MX 1/107) of the taxon was described from the Khuren Dukh Formation, confirming the presence of a long neck with at least 13 cervical vertebrae. A phylogenetic analysis found it to be the most basal hyphalosaurid.

Phylogeny from the analysis of Dong and colleagues (2020):

- Choristodera
  - Cteniogenys sp.
  - - Heishanosaurus pygmaeus
    - Coeruleodraco jurassicus
    - - Neochoristodera
        - Ikechosaurus pijiagouensis
        - Ikechosaurus sunailinae
        - Tchoiria namsari
        - Tchoiria klauseni
        - Champsosaurus
          - C. gigas
          - C. albertensis
        - Simoedosaurus
          - S. lemoinei
          - S. dakotensis
      - "Allochoristodera"
        - Monjurosuchus splendens
        - Philydrosaurus
          - P. proseilus
          - P. proseilus
        - - Lazarussuchus
            - L. inexpectatus
            - Lazarussuchus sp.
            - L. dvoraki
          - - Khurendukhosaurus orlovi
            - Hyphalosaurus sp.
            - - Hyphalosaurus lingyuanensis
              - Shokawa ikoi
