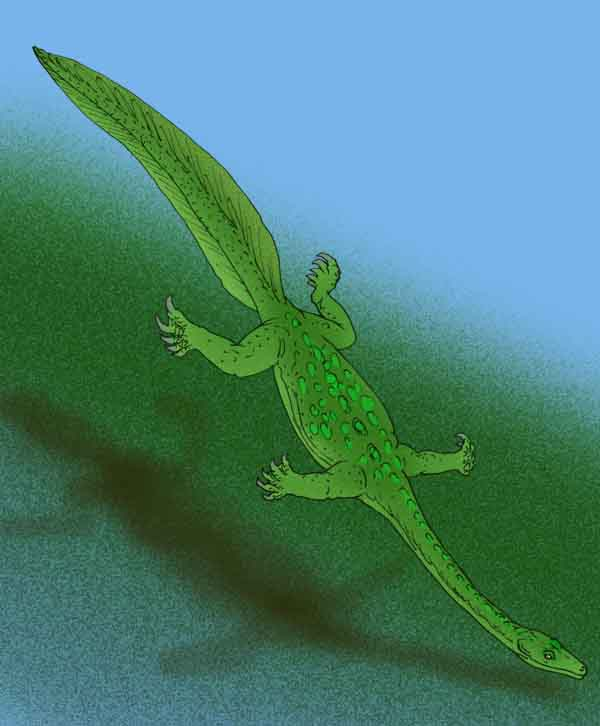
- Artist's reconstruction

Scientific classification
- Kingdom: Animalia
- Phylum: Chordata
- Class: Reptilia
- Order: †Choristodera
- Family: †Hyphalosauridae
- Genus: †Shokawa; Evans & Manabe, 1998

Type species
- †Shokawa ikoi Evans & Manabe, 1998

= Shokawa =

Shokawa Temporal range: Early Cretaceous, Berriasian

Extinct genus of reptiles

Shokawa is an extinct genus of choristoderan diapsid reptile, known from the Lower Cretaceous of Japan. It is only known from one species, Shokawa ikoi. The only known remains are a postcranial specimen lacking the skull, discovered at the KO2 locality in sediments belonging to the Okurodani Formation near the village of Shokawa in Gifu Prefecture. Shokawa possessed a long neck with at least 16 cervical vertebrae, and closely resembles and is closely related to the smaller choristoderan, Hyphalosaurus. The generic name refers to the village near where it was found, while the specific name honors the collector of the first specimen, one Mr. Ikoi Shibata.

Phylogeny from the analysis of Dong and colleagues (2020):

- Choristodera
  - Cteniogenys sp.
  - - Heishanosaurus pygmaeus
    - Coeruleodraco jurassicus
    - - Neochoristodera
        - Ikechosaurus pijiagouensis
        - Ikechosaurus sunailinae
        - Tchoiria namsari
        - Tchoiria klauseni
        - Champsosaurus
          - C. gigas
          - C. albertensis
        - Simoedosaurus
          - S. lemoinei
          - S. dakotensis
      - "Allochoristodera"
        - Monjurosuchus splendens
        - Philydrosaurus
          - P. proseilus
          - P. proseilus
        - - Lazarussuchus
            - L. inexpectatus
            - Lazarussuchus sp.
            - L. dvoraki
          - - Khurendukhosaurus orlovi
            - Hyphalosaurus sp.
            - - Hyphalosaurus lingyuanensis
              - Shokawa ikoi
