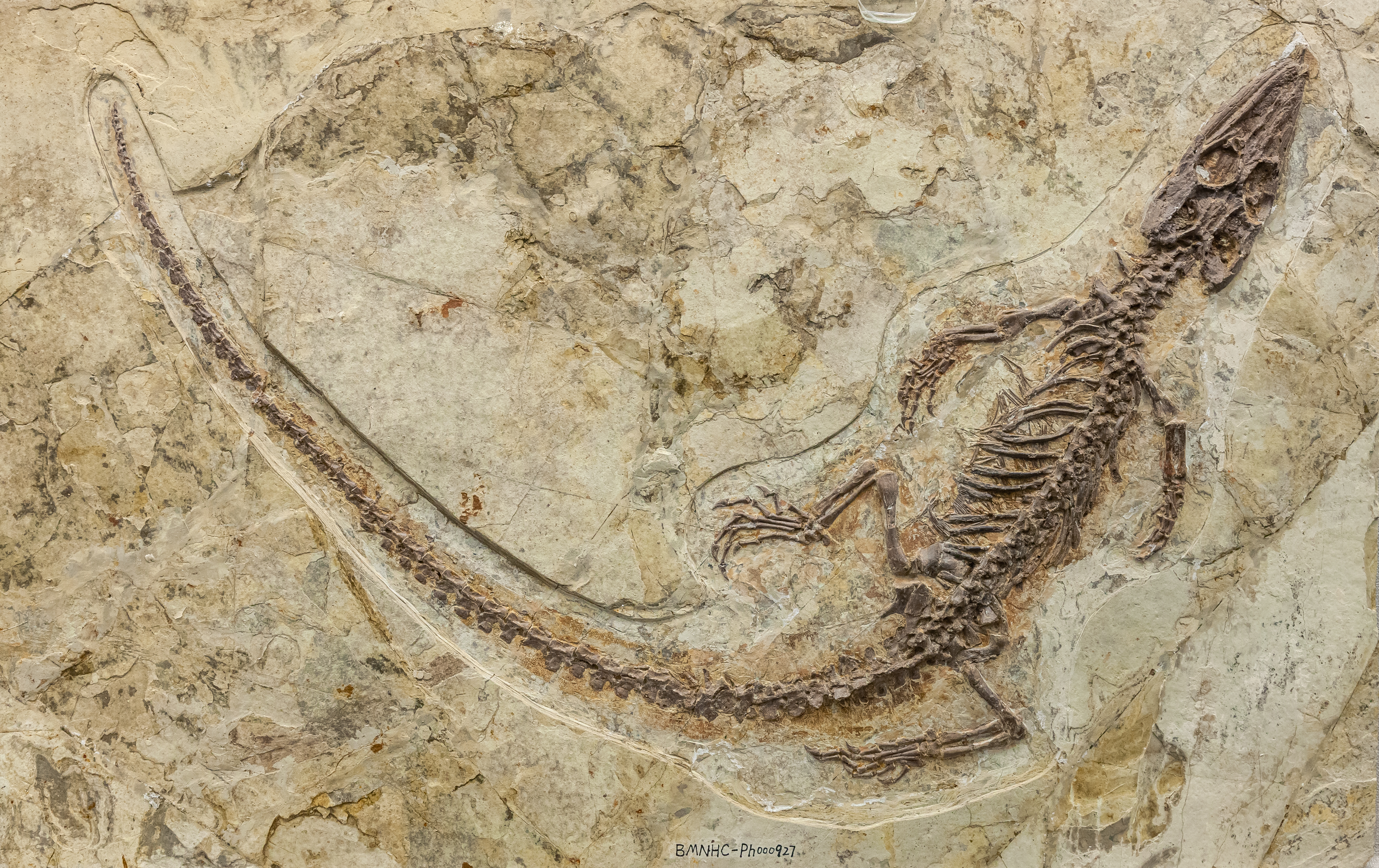
- Fossil specimen preserving skin impressions, National Museum of Natural Science

Scientific classification
- Kingdom: Animalia
- Phylum: Chordata
- Class: Reptilia
- Order: †Choristodera
- Genus: †Philydrosaurus; Gao and Fox, 2005

Species
- †P. proseilus Gao and Fox, 2005 (type)

= Philydrosaurus =

Philydrosaurus Temporal range: Aptian

Extinct genus of reptiles

Philydrosaurus is an extinct genus of choristoderan which existed in China during the Early Cretaceous. The type species P. proseilus was named in 2005. Philydrosaurus was found from the Jiufotang Formation and is slightly younger than Monjurosuchus, which was found from the Yixian Formation.

== Description ==
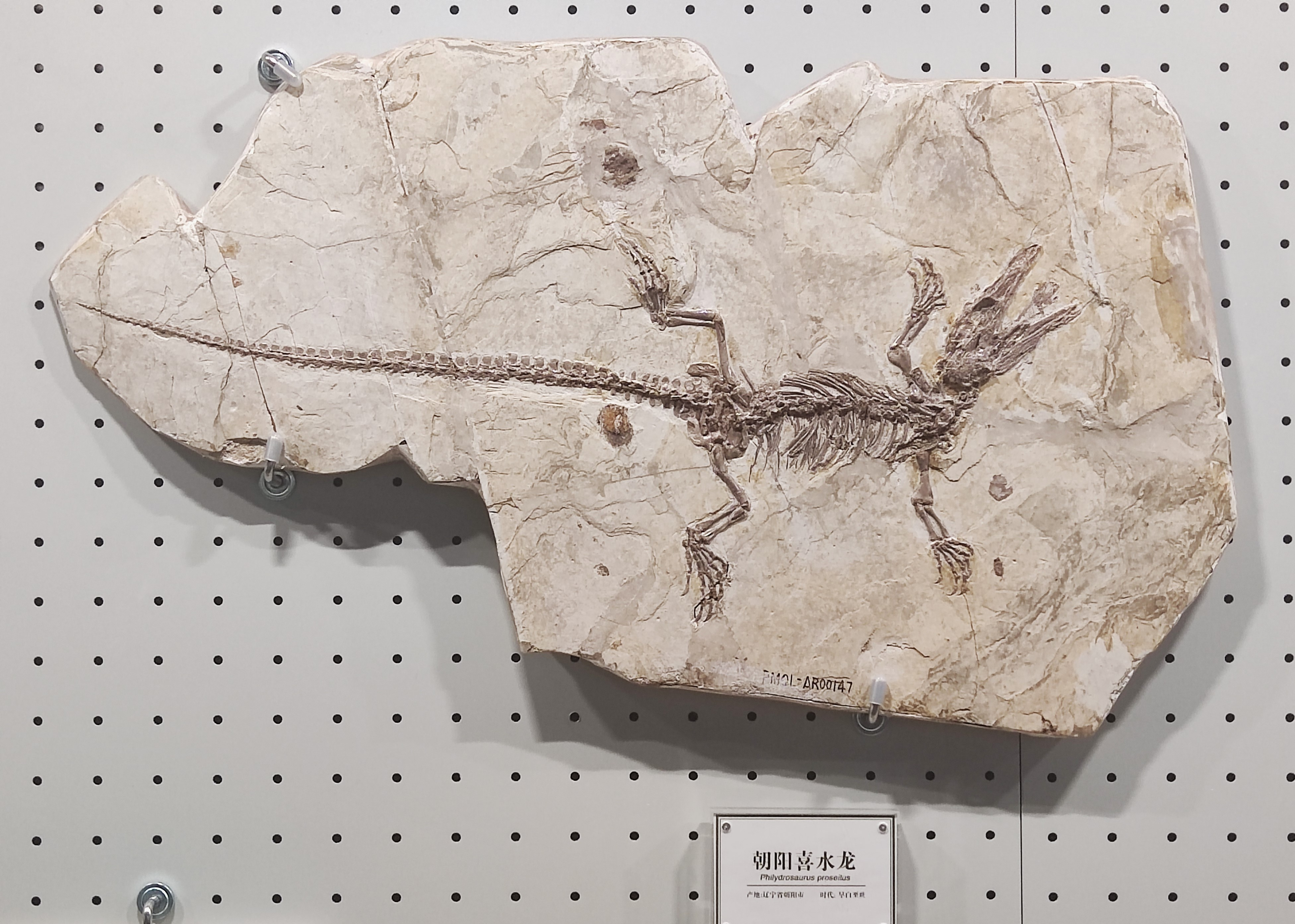
Fossil in Liaoning Palaeontological Museum

Distinct ridges cover the prefrontal and postfrontal bones of the skull, distinguishing Philydrosaurus from related genera. The lower temporal fenestra, usually present as a hole in the back of the skull of choristoderes, is closed by bone in Philydrosaurus. The eye sockets are large and spaced close together, similar to Monjurosuchus and Lazarussuchus. Philydrosaurus is considered more basal than these choristoderes because its eyes are not as closely spaced and face laterally rather than dorsally. The skull is similar in shape to that of Cteniogenys, the most basal choristodere. The shortness of the skull and the laterally facing eye sockets likely represent the ancestral condition for choristoderes, but the closed lower temporal fenestra links the genus with more advanced forms.

== Paleobiology ==
A skeleton of Philydrosaurus has been found with associated post-hatchling stage juveniles, suggesting that they engaged in post-hatching parental care.

== Phylogeny ==
Phylogeny from the analysis of Dong and colleagues (2020):

- Choristodera
  - Cteniogenys sp.
  - - Heishanosaurus pygmaeus
    - Coeruleodraco jurassicus
    - - Neochoristodera
        - Ikechosaurus pijiagouensis
        - Ikechosaurus sunailinae
        - Tchoiria namsari
        - Tchoiria klauseni
        - Champsosaurus
          - C. gigas
          - C. albertensis
        - Simoedosaurus
          - S. lemoinei
          - S. dakotensis
      - "Allochoristodera"
        - Monjurosuchus splendens
        - Philydrosaurus
          - P. proseilus
          - P. proseilus
        - - Lazarussuchus
            - L. inexpectatus
            - Lazarussuchus sp.
            - L. dvoraki
          - - Khurendukhosaurus orlovi
            - Hyphalosaurus sp.
            - - Hyphalosaurus lingyuanensis
              - Shokawa ikoi
