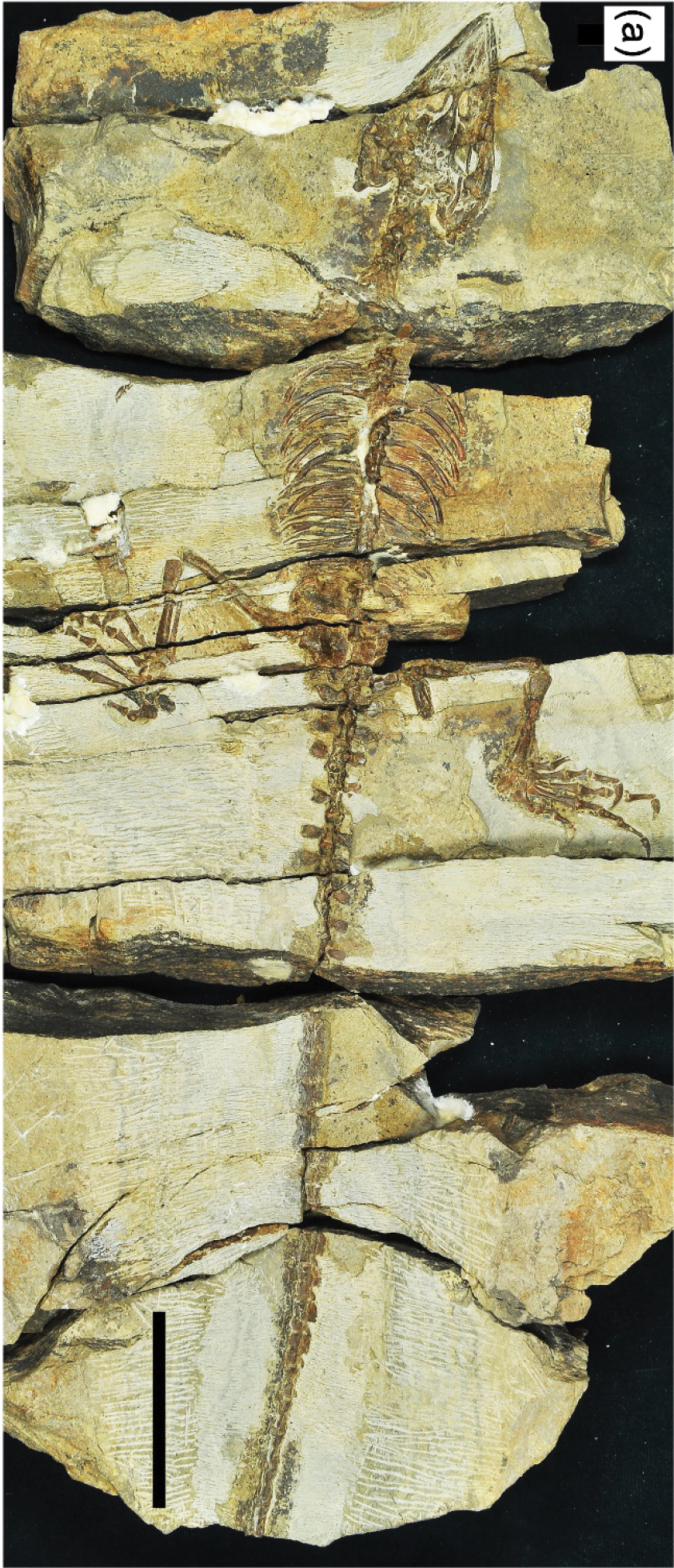
- Paratype specimen

Scientific classification
- Kingdom: Animalia
- Phylum: Chordata
- Class: Reptilia
- Order: †Choristodera
- Genus: †Coeruleodraco; Matsumoto et al., 2019

Type species
- †Coeruleodraco jurassicus Matsumoto et al., 2019

= Coeruleodraco =

Coeruleodraco Temporal range: Oxfordian, 163.5–157.3 Ma

Extinct genus of choristoderan reptiles

Coeruleodraco is an extinct genus of choristoderan known from the Late Jurassic (Oxfordian) Tiaojishan Formation in China. Coeruleodraco is significant as the most complete Jurassic choristodere taxon, as the only other named Jurassic choristodere Cteniogenys is based on fragmentary remains. Although similar to Philydrosaurus in its proportions and postcranial characters, it is distinct in retaining several apparently plesiomorphic characters, including a short snout, paired external nares and an open lower temporal fenestra.

== Description ==
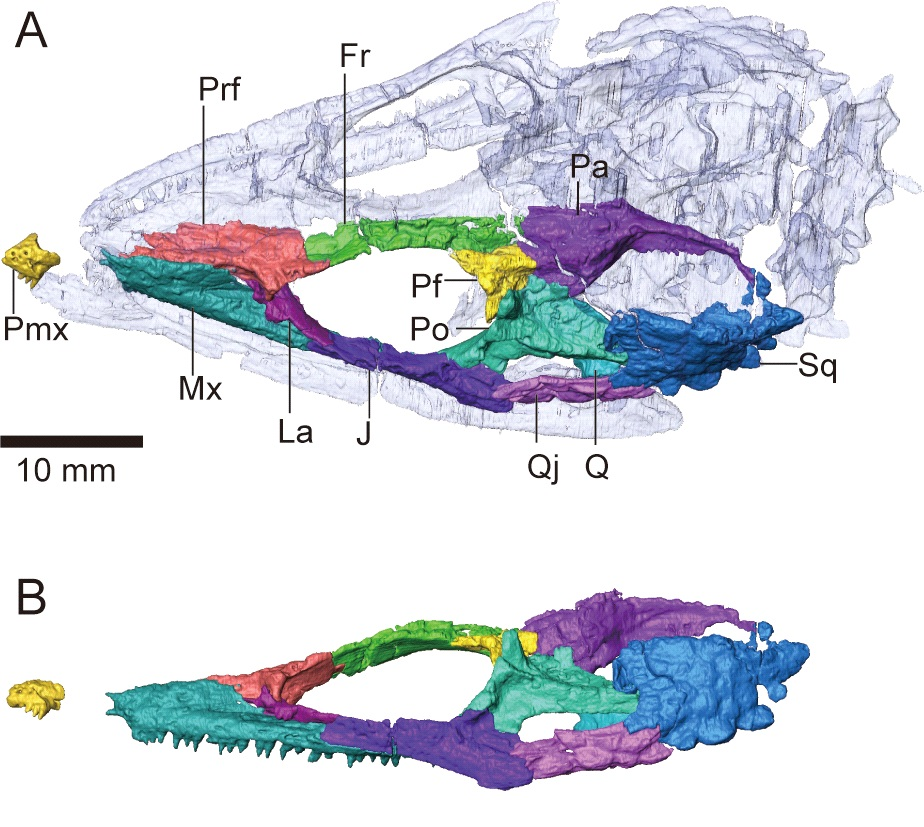
CT scan of the skull of the holotype

The skeleton was small, about 20.3 cm (8.0 inches) in length, not including the tail. The tail is incomplete, but including its estimated length, the total length of the skeleton would have been closer to 40.0 cm (15.7 inches). Coeruleodraco had a generalized, lizard-like body type. This is similar to some early choristoderes (like Cteniogenys, Philydrosaurus, and Monjurosuchus), but contrasts with other choristodere body types including long-necked forms such as Hyphalosaurus, and gharial-like forms such as Champsosaurus and other neochoristoderes.

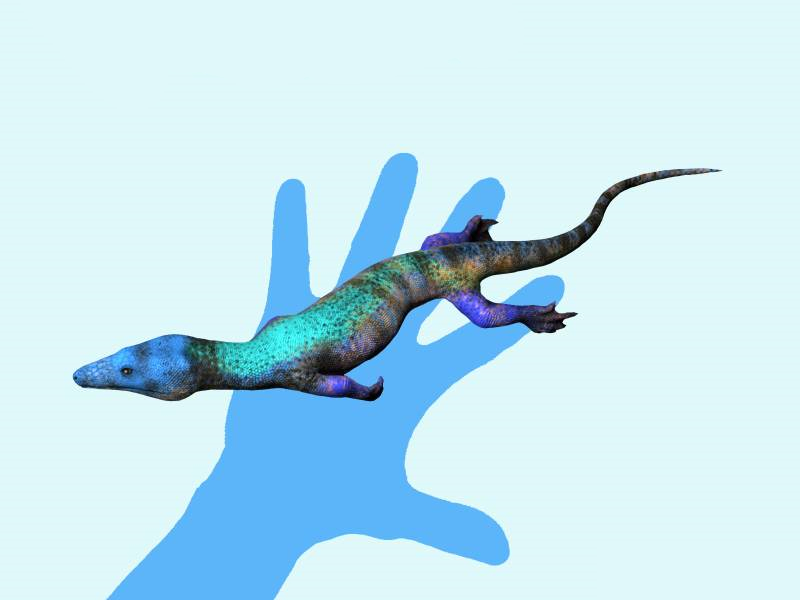
Life reconstruction of C. jurassicus compared to a human hand

The skull had a short, pointed snout with about 38 teeth on each side (a low number by choristodere standards). It also had two nares (nostril holes). While paired nares are standard in most reptile groups, almost all other choristoderes (except Lazarussuchus) typically have one single hole in the skull for the nostrils, making Coeruleodraco's retention of paired nares a plesiomorphic ("primitive") feature relative to most other choristoderes. In common with other choristoderes, Coeruleodraco has elongated prefrontal bones which meet each other at the top of the snout, separating a pair of small, triangular nasal bones in the process. The nasals are so reduced in size (especially compared to Philydrosaurus) that they are completely surrounded by the prefrontals and premaxillary bones, and fail to contact the toothed maxillary bones. The postorbital and postfrontal bones (which lie behind the eye) are separate from each other; in many other choristoderes these bones fuse into a single postorbitofrontal bone. The rear of the skull is not particularly unusual, with each side of the skull having two holes known as temporal fenestrae (as with other diapsids). The upper temporal fenestra is not elongated (unlike neochoristoderes), but the lower temporal fenestra is low and long. The rear edge of each upper temporal fenestra was formed by the squamosal bone, which was ornamented with small spines.

The postcranial skeleton was very similar to that of Philydrosaurus. The neck was short, and its vertebrae had low, swollen neural arches (upper portions). There were six or seven vertebrae in the neck, 16 in the torso, three in the hip, and more than 24 in the tail, which is incomplete. Vertebrae were longer than high, and the neural arches were completely fused to the centra (lower, spool-shaped portions), in contrast to the condition in neochoristoderes. Vertebrae at the base of the tail were fused to fan-shaped ribs which projected straight out. Further down the tail, these ribs became shorter and rectangular. The humerus was robust, with a roughly-textured knob above the large entepicondyle. The plate-like ischium bone (which formed the rear lower part of the hip) had a distinct triangular prong along its rear edge.

== Classification ==
A group of phylogenetic analyses recovered Coeruleodraco as one of the earliest diverging members of a group of small-bodied Eurasian choristoderes. This group was likely a clade according to the parsimony analysis, in which case it was the sister taxon of the gharial-like neochoristoderes, although its monophyly is more uncertain under the bootstrap analysis. The only known genus of choristodere which diverged earlier than Coeruleodraco was Cteniogenys, which acquired a few specialized features independently of other choristoderes.

- Choristodera
  - Cteniogenys sp.
  - - Neochoristodera
      - Ikechosaurus pijiagouensis
      - Ikechosaurus sunailinae
      - Tchoiria namsari
      - Tchoiria klauseni
      - Champsosaurus
        - C. gigas
        - C. albertensis
      - Simoedosaurus
        - S. lemoinei
        - S. dakotensis
    - - Coeruleodraco jurassicus
      - - Monjurosuchus splendens (specimen BMNHC 073)
        - Monjurosuchus splendens (specimen DR0003C)
        - Philydrosaurus
          - P. proseilus (specimen PKUP V2001)
          - P. proseilus (specimen LPMC021)
        - Lazarussuchus
          - L. inexpectatus
          - Lazarussuchus sp.
          - L. dvoraki
        - Khurendukhosaurus orlovi
        - Hyphalosaurus sp. (specimen IVPP 14560)
        - - Hyphalosaurus lingyuanensis (specimen IVPP 11075)
          - Shokawa ikoi

In the analyses of Dong and colleagues (2020) it was recovered in a more basal position, outside the clade containing Neochoristodera + the newly named "Allochoristoderes", and in a polytomy with the newly named Heishanosaurus:

- Choristodera
  - Cteniogenys sp.
  - - Heishanosaurus pygmaeus
    - Coeruleodraco jurassicus
    - - Neochoristodera
        - Ikechosaurus pijiagouensis
        - Ikechosaurus sunailinae
        - Tchoiria namsari
        - Tchoiria klauseni
        - Champsosaurus
          - C. gigas
          - C. albertensis
        - Simoedosaurus
          - S. lemoinei
          - S. dakotensis
      - "Allochoristodera"
        - Monjurosuchus splendens
        - Philydrosaurus
          - P. proseilus
          - P. proseilus
        - - Lazarussuchus
            - L. inexpectatus
            - Lazarussuchus sp.
            - L. dvoraki
          - - Khurendukhosaurus orlovi
            - Hyphalosaurus sp.
            - - Hyphalosaurus lingyuanensis
              - Shokawa ikoi
