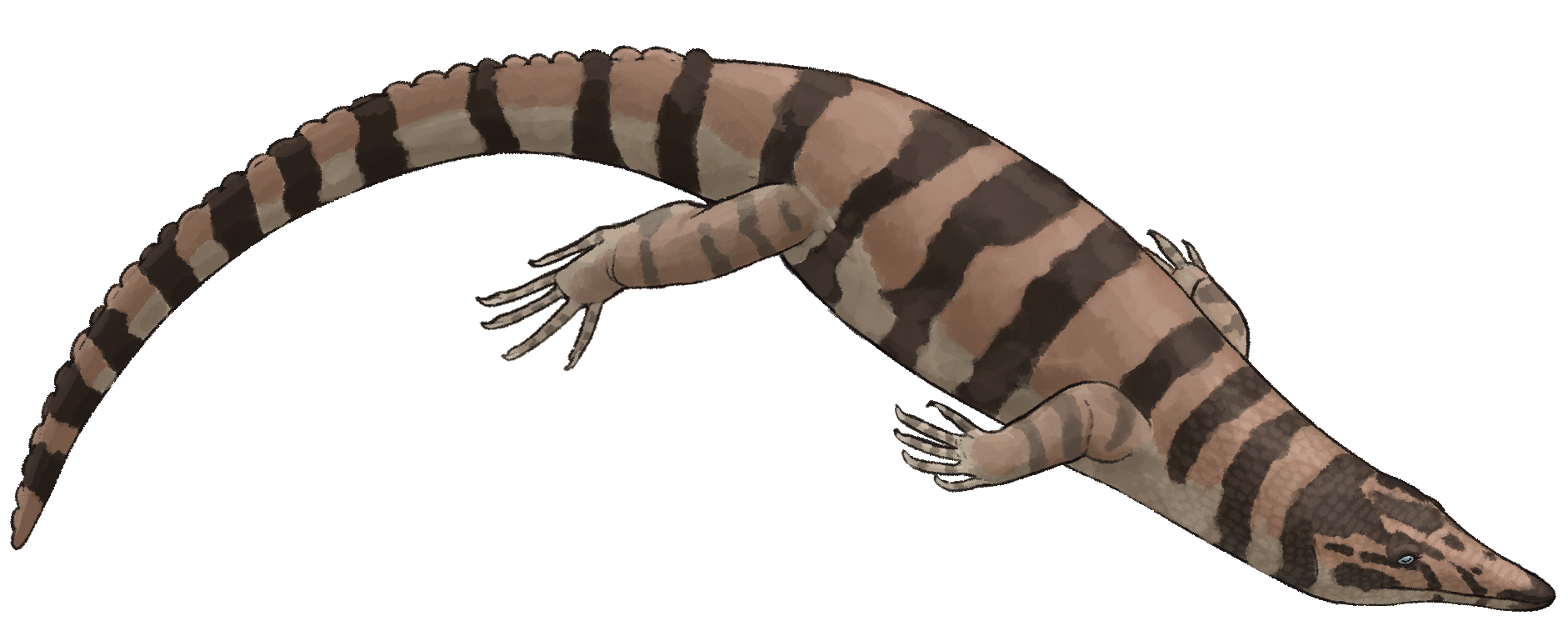
- Reconstruction of Lazarussuchus

Scientific classification
- Kingdom: Animalia
- Phylum: Chordata
- Class: Reptilia
- Order: †Choristodera
- Genus: †Lazarussuchus; Hecht, 1992

Type species
- †Lazarussuchus inexpectatus Hecht, 1992

Other species
- †L. dvoraki Evans and Klembara, 2005

= Lazarussuchus =

Lazarussuchus Temporal range: Late Paleocene - Early Miocene 61–20 Ma (Possible Late Miocene record)

Extinct genus of reptiles

Lazarussuchus (meaning "Lazarus's crocodile") is an extinct genus of amphibious reptile, known from the Cenozoic of Europe. It is the youngest known member of Choristodera, an extinct order of aquatic reptiles that first appeared in the Middle Jurassic. Fossils have been found in Late Paleocene, Late Oligocene, Early Miocene and possibly Late Miocene deposits (~56-20 or possibly 11.6 million years ago) in France, Germany, and the Czech Republic. Two species have been named: the type species L. inexpectatus ("unexpected") (Hecht, 1992) from the late Oligocene of France. and L. dvoraki from the early Miocene of the Czech Republic. It was not a large animal; with the total preserved body and tail length of L. inexpectatus being just over 30 centimetres. A complete specimen of Lazarussuchus with preserved soft tissue was found from the Late Paleocene of France, but has not been assigned to a species.

== Discovery ==
The first remains of Lazarussuchus, belonging to the type species L. inexpectatus were described in 1992 from a mostly complete articulated skeleton (Claude Bernard University no Re 437, coll. Gennevaux 92813) found in the Upper Oligocene aged sediments of the Armissan limestone quarry near Narbonne in Aude, France. The genus was named after the "Lazarus Effect", as the remains were the youngest known choristodere fossils, and resembled the most primitive choristodere known, the Middle-Late Jurassic Cteniogenys. In 2005 another species, L. dvoraki, was described from isolated skull bones and vertebrae from the Early-Middle Miocene sediments of the Merkur-North locality in the north-west Czech Republic. The species was named after Zdeněk Dvořák who had collected the specimens. In 2008, remains of Lazarussuchus were reported from the Upper Oligocene sediments of Oberleichtersbach in northern Bavaria, Germany. Remains included 25 bones, and was suggested to probably represent a new species. In 2013, a specimen of Lazurussuchus was described from the late Paleocene aged Menat Formation near Menat, Puy-de-Dôme in France. The specimen, which is an almost complete articulated skeleton (BDL 1819) is largely preserved as an impression, with remnants of disintegrating bone and some preserved soft tissue. The remains were not assigned to a species however, because it could not be robustly diagnosed separately from the two named species. In 2019, in the supplementary information for the paper describing the remains of the extinct ape Danuvius, indeterminate remains of Lazarussuchus were reported from the Hammerschmiede clay pit near Pforzen, Bavaria, Germany. The Hammerschmiede locality has been dated magnetostratigraphically to the base of the Tortonian stage of the Late Miocene, approximately 11.62 million years ago.

== Description ==
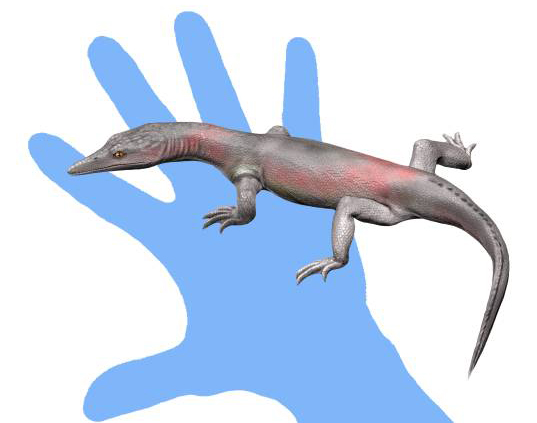
Size compared to a human hand

Restoration of the skull of the Menat specimen of Lazarussuchus in dorsal and lateral views

Lazarussuchus was small and superficially lizard like in appearance, with the total preserved body and tail length of L. inexpectatus being just over 30 centimetres (0.98 ft), and a skull length of around 4.5 centimetres (1.8 in) According to Matsumoto and colleagues (2013) Lazarussuchus is distinguished from all other known choristoderes by the presence of paired nares high on the rostrum, elongated premaxillary bones which replace the maxillae in the anterior part of the rostrum, the slender paired nasal bones are overlapped anteriorly by the premaxillae and wedged between the anterior tips of the prefrontal bones, the nasal bones do not touch the maxillae, the bones on the hind portion of the skull are ornamented with a coarse tuberculous texture, the postorbital and postfrontal bones are fused into a combined postorbitofrontal, the lower temporal fenestrae are closed by the joining of the squamosal, quadratojugal, jugal and postorbitofrontal bones, the cervical ribs are broad and flattened, the trunk ribs are broad and sickle shaped, and are large relative to the size of the vertebrae, the ectepicondylar groove of the humerus is bridged to form a foramen, and the blade of the scapula is slender and parallel sided.

L. inexpectatus is distinguished by having the postparietal processes of the parietal bone equal or nearly equal in length to the parietal plate, directed posteriorly with less than 30 degrees of angulation and only weakly concave, resulting in the upper temporal fenestra being elongated and almost rectangular in shape, with an anterior-posterior long axis, nine cervical vertebrae are present, the posterior portion of the trunk vertebrae have spinous processes below the postzygapophyses that act as additional articular surfaces, four functional sacral vertebrae are present, of which the first is a sacrodorsal, and a slender T-shaped interclavicle. L. dvoraki is distinguished by having postparietal processes only 1/3 of the length of the parietal plate, which are angulated greater than 45 degrees laterally and a concave lateral margin, resulting in the upper temporal fenestrae being smaller and more ovoid in comparison to L. inexpectatus, with a antero-medial to posterolateral long axis, and the trunk vertebrae lack articular spinal processes.

The Menat specimen is distinguished by having 40 maxillary teeth and a total of 52 teeth in the upper jaw as opposed to 11 premaxillary and 24 maxillary tooth positions in L. inexpectatus, however, it cannot be ruled out that these are due to allometry. The Menat specimen is interpreted to have 10 cervical vertebrae, as opposed to the nine reported for L. inexpectatus, however the 10th cervical vertebra of the Menat specimen is similar to the 9th of L. inexpectatus, and there is a gap between the 8th and 9th vertebrae of the L. inexpectatus specimen suggesting a vertebra could be missing or obscured. The ribs tuberculum and capitulum are joined by a crest in L. inexpectatus, but the crest on the ribs of the 9th vertebra is limited. In the Menat specimen, the crest is present on all cervical ribs, including a particularly strong crest on the rib of the ninth vertebra. However, this contrast may be due to missalignment of vertebral counts as mentioned previously. The interclavicle of L. inexpectatus was described as T-shaped in its initial description, however the main part of the bone is not visible, and only a strong lateral process is visible. In contrast, the Menat specimen interclavicle is rhomboid in shape, but the lateral processes are incomplete, making comparison difficult. The type specimen of L. inexpectatus has plantar tubercles present on the proximal portion of the fifth metatarsal, while the Menat specimen does not. However, this difference can only be properly evaluated in 3 dimensional specimens. Matsumoto and colleagues (2013) declined to create a new species for the Menat specimen despite it being "most certainly specifically distinct" because "species diagnoses must be based on clear morphological differences and this is problematic for the Menat specimen" going on to state that "Size and preservation could .... explain many or all of the observed differences between the [L. inexpectatus type and Menat] specimens".

The premaxilla of the Oberleichtersbach Lazarussuchus is shorter than that of L. inexpectatus, alongside other unspecified cranial bone differences.

=== Soft tissue ===
The Menat specimen of Lazarussuchus preserves some remnants of soft tissue, but no scales, which shows that the hindfoot (pes) was not webbed, and a dark stained region with a crenellated edge is present above the caudal vertebrae of the tail, suggestive of a crest similar to those found in some living reptiles, like the tuatara, lizards and crocodiles.

== Age and relationships ==
Lazarussuchus is the youngest member of the group Choristodera and the only choristodere known to have lived after the Eocene. The crocodile-like neochoristoderes went extinct at the start of the Eocene, possibly due to climatic changes happening at this time, known as the Paleocene-Eocene Thermal Maximum. The first discovered fossils of Lazarussuchus came from the Late Oligocene, meaning that it extended the fossil range of Choristodera by several million years. At the time of its discovery Lazarussuchus was considered an example of the Lazarus effect because its "unexpected" presence followed a long gap in the choristodere fossil record.

Lazarussuchus was initially interpreted as the basalmost member of Choristodera, meaning that its lineage must have been the earliest to branch off from the group. Since the first definitive choristoderes appear in the Middle Jurassic, the lineage represented by Lazarussuchus implied a very long ghost lineage of choristoderes spanning at least 100 million years. However in the 2005 description of L. dvoraki, it was placed as the sister group of neochoristoderes. Matsumoto and colleagues (2013) placed Cteniogenys, the oldest known choristodere, as the most basal member of the group and has Lazarussuchus in a more derived position within a clade of small-bodied choristoderes known from the Early Cretaceous of Asia, united by the shared condition of closed lower temporal fenestrae, which has been recovered by most subsequent analyses. The clade was informally named the "Allochoristodera" by Dong and colleagues (2020). This position significantly shortens the ghost lineage of Lazarussuchus, although there is still a gap between the disappearance of small-bodied, lizard-like choristoderes at the end of the Early Cretaceous and their reappearance in the form of Lazarussuchus in the Paleocene. Possible lizard-like choristoderes have been found in Late Cretaceous North American deposits, although their remains are very fragmentary.

Phylogeny from the analysis of Dong and colleagues (2020):

- Choristodera
  - Cteniogenys sp.
  - - Heishanosaurus pygmaeus
    - Coeruleodraco jurassicus
    - - Neochoristodera
        - Ikechosaurus pijiagouensis
        - Ikechosaurus sunailinae
        - Tchoiria namsari
        - Tchoiria klauseni
        - Champsosaurus
          - C. gigas
          - C. albertensis
        - Simoedosaurus
          - S. lemoinei
          - S. dakotensis
      - "Allochoristodera"
        - Monjurosuchus splendens
        - Philydrosaurus
          - P. proseilus
          - P. proseilus
        - - Lazarussuchus
            - L. inexpectatus
            - Lazarussuchus sp.
            - L. dvoraki
          - - Khurendukhosaurus orlovi
            - Hyphalosaurus sp.
            - - Hyphalosaurus lingyuanensis
              - Shokawa ikoi

== Paleoecology ==
Although no gut contents have been found, Lazarussuchus is assumed to have fed on invertebrates. At Oberleichtersbach and Merkur-North, Lazaurussuchus was found in continental lake deposits, with a subtropical climate. Occurring alongside fish, frogs, turtles, squamates and alligatoroid crocodillians belonging to the genus Diplocynodon.
