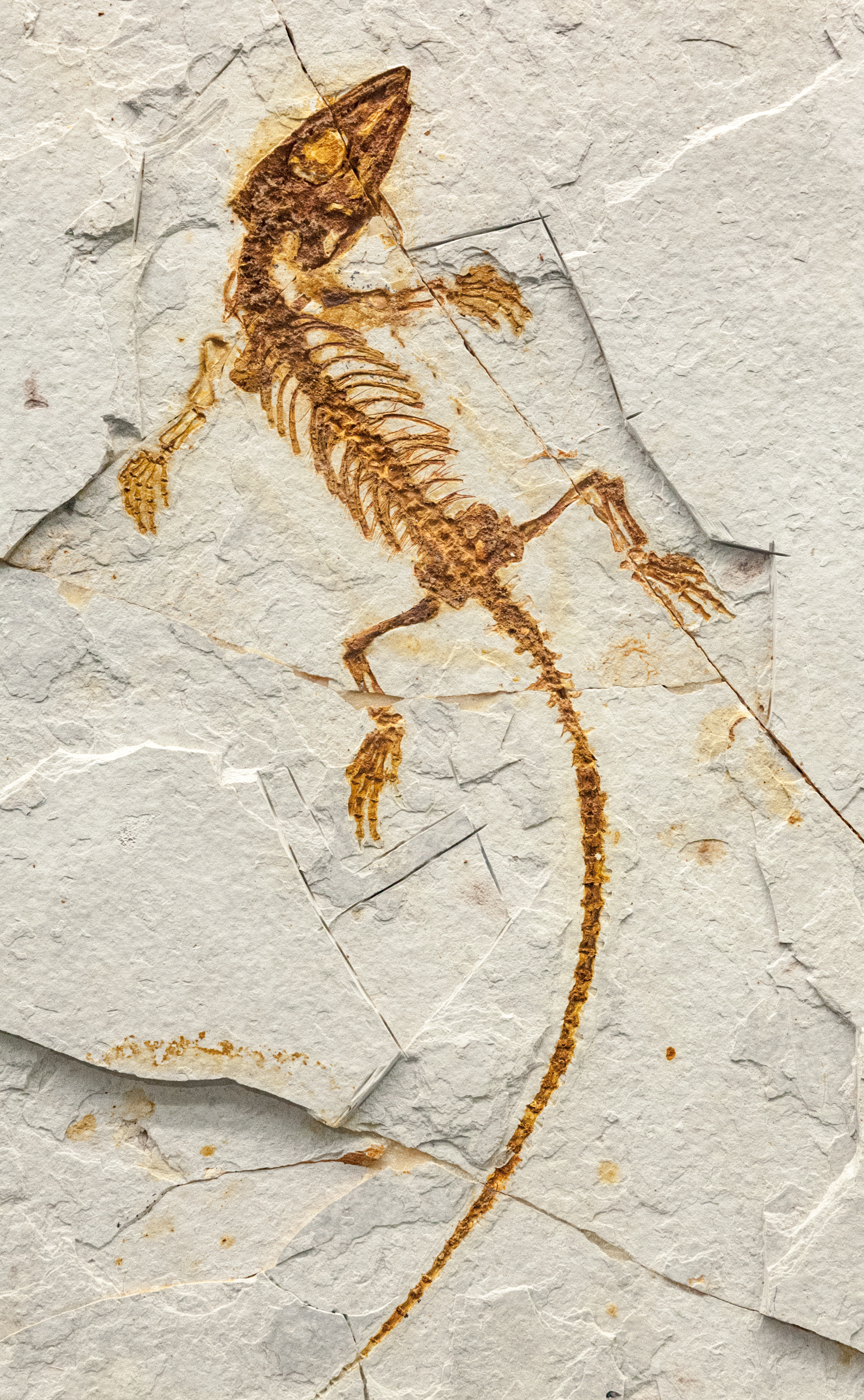
- Fossil specimen, on display at the National Museum of Natural Science

Scientific classification
- Kingdom: Animalia
- Phylum: Chordata
- Class: Reptilia
- Order: †Choristodera
- Genus: †Monjurosuchus; Endo, 1940

Species
- †M. splendens Endo, 1940 (type)

= Monjurosuchus =

Monjurosuchus Temporal range: Early Cretaceous Hauterivian–Aptian

Extinct genus of reptiles

Monjurosuchus is a genus of choristoderan reptile that lived in what is now China and Japan during the Early Cretaceous. It has large eyes, a rounded skull, robust legs with short claws, and a long, thin tail. Fossils have been found that preserve soft tissue, showing that it had soft skin and webbed feet.

== Description and history ==
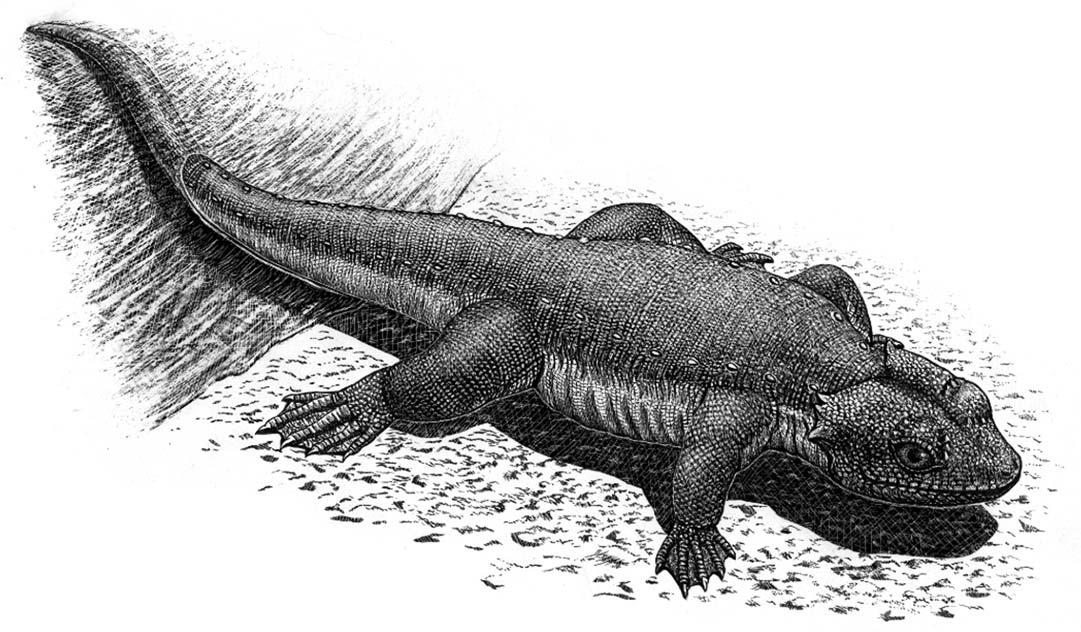
Restoration of a Japanese specimen, which may represent a second species

Monjurosuchus was first found in China as part of the Early Cretaceous Jehol Biota. Named in 1940, the type species M. splendens was the first reptile described from the Yixian Formation. The holotype specimen was lost during World War II but was replaced in 2000 by a recently discovered neotype preserving soft tissue. In 2007, remains were described from the Kuwajima Formation and the Okurodani Formation of the Tetori Group of Japan. The Japanese material represents a different species of Monjurosuchus that has not yet been named.

Monjurosuchus was a small choristodere, reaching a total body length of 30–40 cm (0.98–1.31 ft). Unlike related choristoderes, Monjurosuchus has a relatively short neck with eight vertebrae, one less than usual. The skull is rounded rather than pointed and is dorsoventrally flattened in all fossils. The eye sockets are large and prominent temporal regions extend from the back of the skull. The jaws are lined with small, sharp teeth, while the palate is covered in closely spaced tooth batteries. One distinguishing feature of Monjurosuchus is the lack of a lower temporal fenestra, a hole in the back of the skull that is common in many other diapsid reptiles, including most choristoderes. Monjurosuchus is also distinct in having small spikes on the edge of the squamosal bone at the back of the skull.

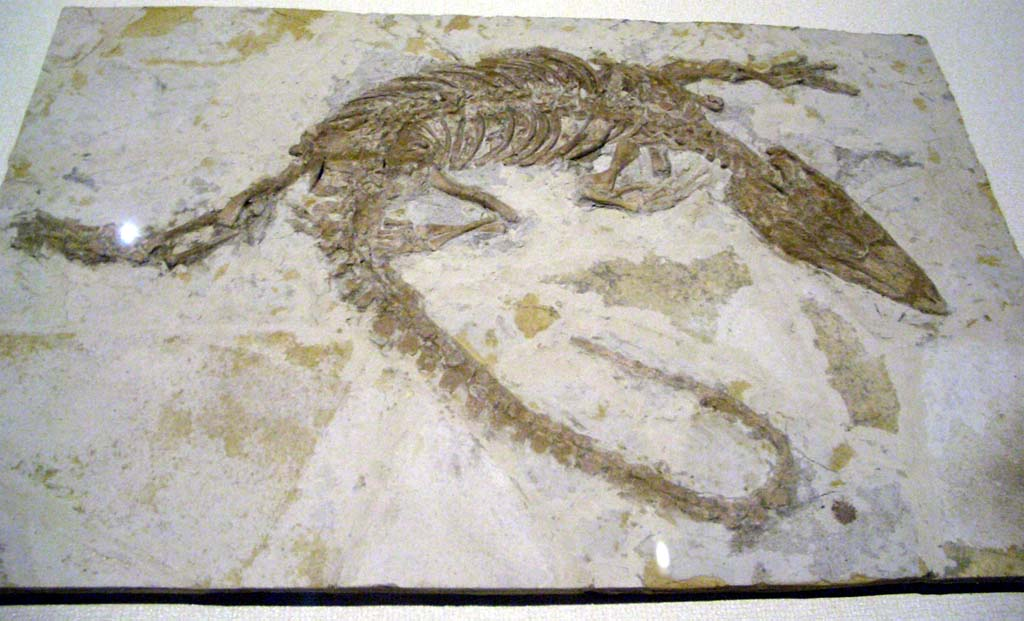
Fossil of Monjurosuchus splendens in the Hong Kong Science Museum.

Specimens from China preserve soft tissue, including scales and webbing between the toes of the feet. The scales of Monjurosuchus were small, giving the animal soft skin. Two rows of larger scutes run along its back. The rest of the scales on the back are small, while the scales on the underside are slightly smaller. The skin of Monjurosuchus has a similar appearance to the living Chinese crocodile lizard Shinisaurus.

The feet of Monjurosuchus are webbed, with skin covering all parts of the foot but the short claws. The limbs were robust and the hips are wide. The long, slender tail shows no adaptations for its presumed semi-aquatic lifestyle. Gastralia are present on the underside of Monjurosuchus and are much thinner than the ribs. Intestinal contents are preserved between the gastralia and ribs of one specimen. Most of the material is sediment, but there are also fragments of what may be arthropod cuticle, indicating that Monjurosuchus may have fed on invertebrates.

== Classification ==
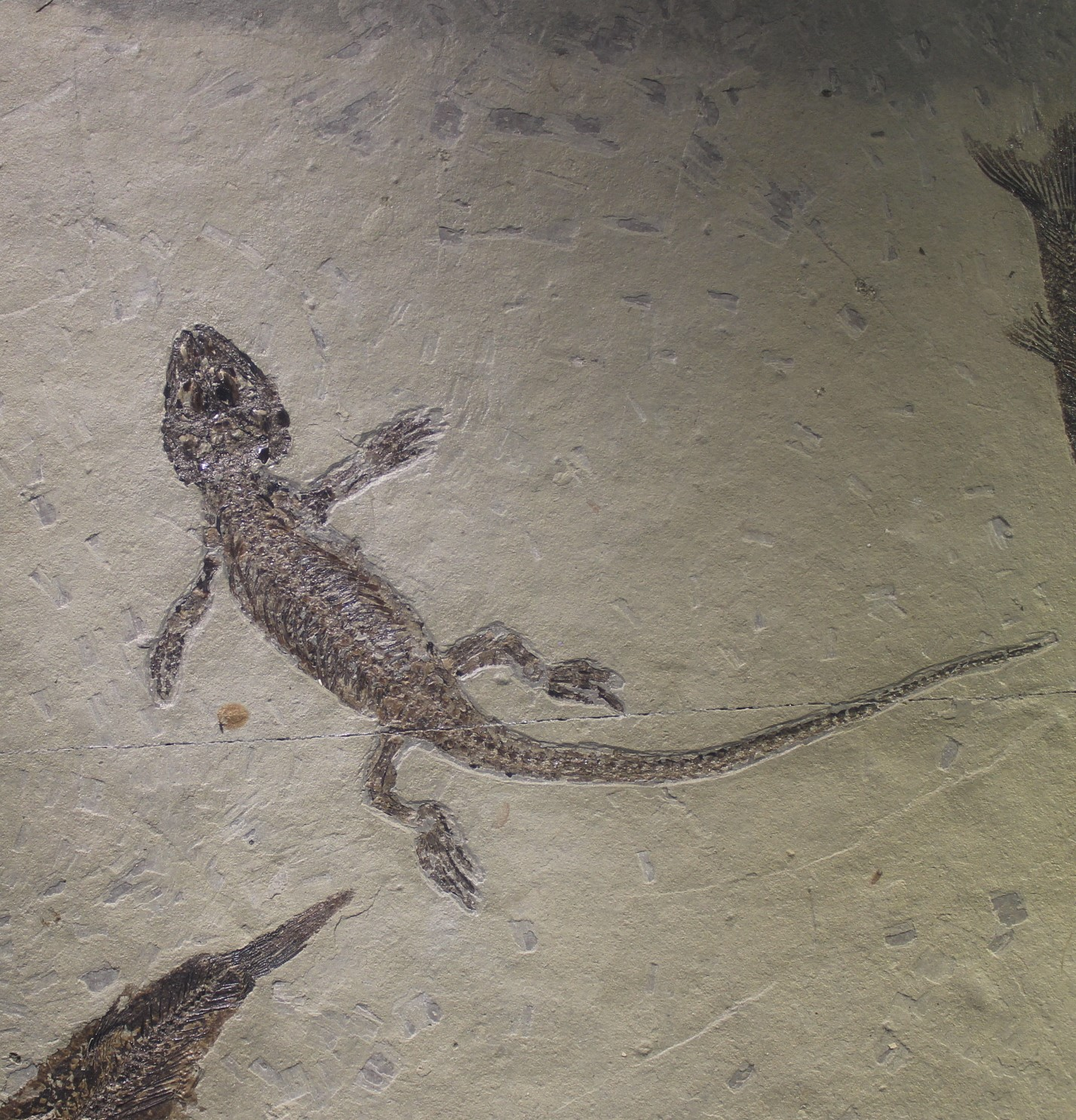
Juvenile specimen, Beijing Museum of Natural History

Monjurosuchus is a basal choristodere that lies outside the more advanced Neochoristodera. When named in 1940, it was placed in its own family Monjurosuchidae. Unlike Monjurosuchus, neochoristoderes have small, dorsally facing eyes and long snouts. Philydrosaurus, another Early Cretaceous Chinese choristodere, was grouped with Monjurosuchus in Monjurosuchidae. A 2007 phylogenetic analysis of choristoderes found only weak support for this family, as Philydrosaurus seemed to be a more basal choristodere than Monjurosuchus. A close relationship was found between Monjurosuchus and the Miocene Lazarussuchus, but this was only weakly supported.

Phylogeny from the analysis of Dong and colleagues (2020):

- Choristodera
  - Cteniogenys sp.
  - - Heishanosaurus pygmaeus
    - Coeruleodraco jurassicus
    - - Neochoristodera
        - Ikechosaurus pijiagouensis
        - Ikechosaurus sunailinae
        - Tchoiria namsari
        - Tchoiria klauseni
        - Champsosaurus
          - C. gigas
          - C. albertensis
        - Simoedosaurus
          - S. lemoinei
          - S. dakotensis
      - "Allochoristodera"
        - Monjurosuchus splendens
        - Philydrosaurus
          - P. proseilus
          - P. proseilus
        - - Lazarussuchus
            - L. inexpectatus
            - Lazarussuchus sp.
            - L. dvoraki
          - - Khurendukhosaurus orlovi
            - Hyphalosaurus sp.
            - - Hyphalosaurus lingyuanensis
              - Shokawa ikoi
