= Irenosaurus =

Irenosaurus Temporal range: Early Cretaceous, Aptian

Scientific classification
- Domain: Eukaryota
- Kingdom: Animalia
- Phylum: Chordata
- Class: Reptilia
- Order: †Choristodera
- Genus: †Irenosaurus; Efimov, 1988
- Species: †I. egloni

Binomial name
- †Irenosaurus egloni (Efimov, 1983 [originally Tchoiria egloni])

Extinct genus of reptiles

Irenosaurus is a genus of choristodere, a type of amphibious reptile. It is known from a single fragmentary postcranial skeleton (PIN 3386/2), discovered in the Aptian-age Lower Cretaceous Hühteeg Formation at Hüren Dukh, central Mongolia. The type species is I. egloni, which was originally described as a new species of the related choristodere Tchoiria in 1983 by Efimov. Efimov transferred the species to the new genus Irenosaurus in 1988. Evans and Hecht (1993) questioned the separation of the taxon from Tchoiria namsarai from the same locality on the grounds that the differences between the two may not have been greater than those of various species of the choristodere Champsosaurus. A later review by Efimov and Storrs (2000) retained the two as separate, noting that some characteristics of Irenosaurus are more like Khurendukhosaurus, also known from the same site, at the same time recognizing the difficulties of distinguishing three genera from the same locality. Irenosaurus was a small choristodere, approximately 1 to 1.5 metres (3.3 to 4.9 ft) long. It is known from what are interpreted as lake deposits.
