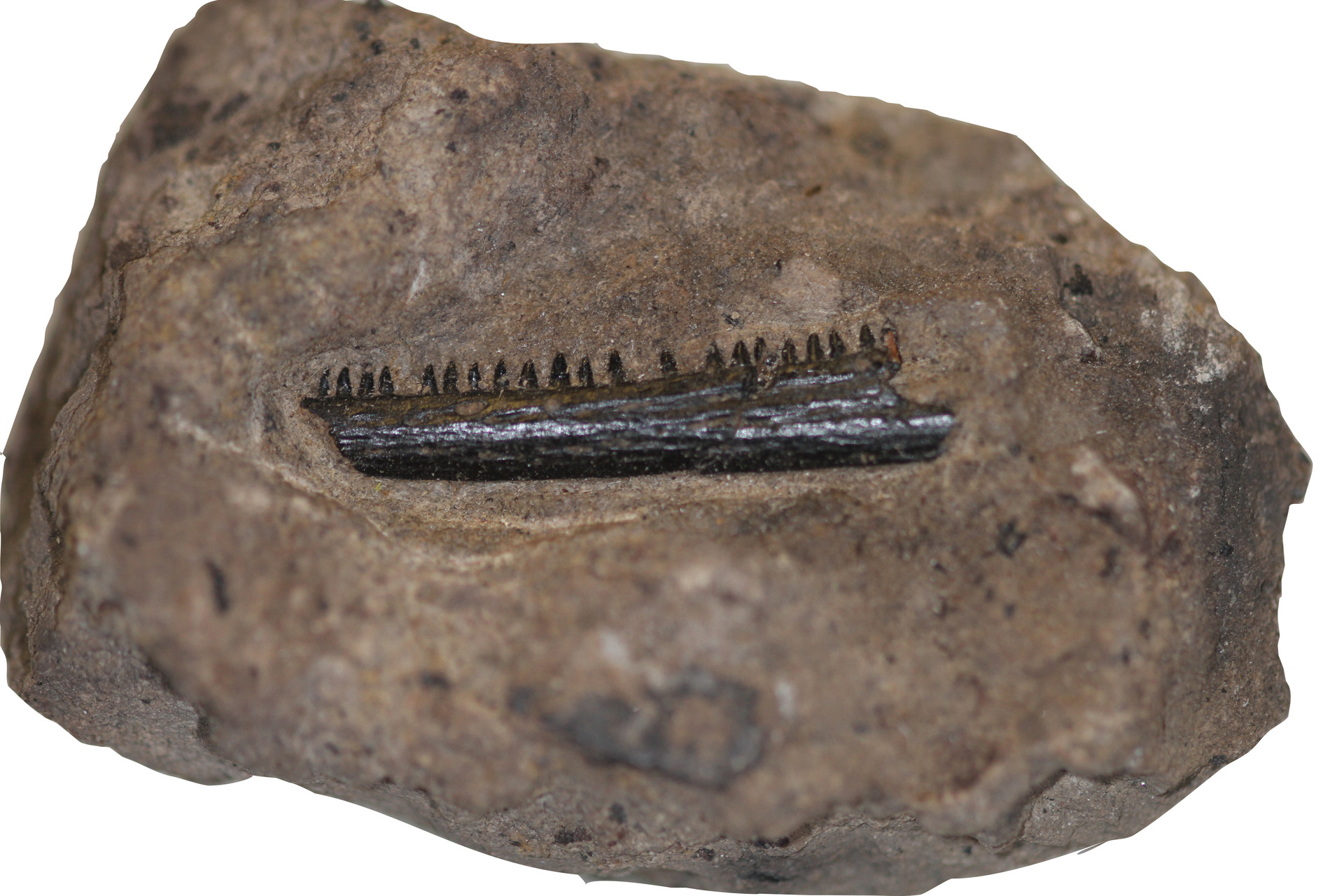
- Dentary of the holotype specimen VP.001088

Scientific classification
- Domain: Eukaryota
- Kingdom: Animalia
- Phylum: Chordata
- Class: Reptilia
- Order: †Choristodera
- Family: †Cteniogenidae; Seiffert, 1975
- Genus: †Cteniogenys; Gilmore, 1928
- Species: †C. antiquus

Binomial name
- †Cteniogenys antiquus Gilmore, 1928

= Cteniogenys =

Cteniogenys Temporal range: Middle-Late Jurassic, 167.7–150 Ma

Genus of reptiles

Cteniogenys is a genus of choristodere, a morphologically diverse group of aquatic reptiles. It is part of the monotypic family Cteniogenidae. The type and only named species, C. antiquus, was named in 1928 by Charles W. Gilmore. The holotype, VP.001088, was collected in the Morrison Formation (Como Bluff), Wyoming in 1881 by William H. Reed. More specimens have been discovered since then, including specimens from the Late Jurassic of Portugal and Middle Jurassic of Britain, which have not been assigned to species.

== Description ==
Cteniogenys was 25 to 50 centimetres (9.8 to 19.7 in) long, and probably weighed less than 500 grams (1.1 lb). The skull of this genus was long and slender, and the jaws had numerous conical teeth. Cteniogenys in the Morrison probably fed on insects and small fish. It is mostly known from freshwater sites (rivers and ponds), and is a rare find in the formation (only 60 specimens out of over 2,800 total vertebrate specimens known from the formation), mostly known from northern outcrops (particularly Wyoming); this may reflect a preservation bias against small animals in terrestrial settings, rather than an accurate reflection of Cteniogenys populations in the Morrison.

== Distribution ==
Fossils of Cteniogenys are known from the upper Middle Jurassic (Bathonian) aged Forest Marble Formation and Kilmaluag Formation of Britain, the Late Jurassic (Kimmeridgian) aged Alcobaça Formation of Portugal, and the Late Jurassic-age Morrison Formation of western North America, indeterminate similar remains are also known from the Callovian aged Balabansai Formation of Kyrgyzstan and the Bathonian aged Itat Formation of western Siberia, and the Berriasian aged Angeac-Charente bonebed in France.

A handful of skull and jaw fragments from the Late Cretaceous Oldman Formation and Dinosaur Park Formation in Canada were assigned to Cteniogenys by Gao and Fox (1998). Given the long gap in time, however, Gao et al. (2005) cautioned that these remains could constitute a different, as-yet undetermined genus. In their description of new material of Khurendukhosaurus, Matsumoto et al. (2009) agreed that the putative Cretaceous occurrence of Cteniogenys did not belong to that genus and represents an indeterminate choristoderan, possibly a new genus.

== Systematics ==
The genus was named in 1928 by Charles W. Gilmore on the basis of a lower jaw collected during the late 19th century by Othniel Charles Marsh's workers at Como Bluff. He tentatively described the genus as a lizard, noting that it could instead be a frog. New material of Cteniogenys from Europe prompted Susan E. Evans to reclassify it as an early choristodere in 1989. To date it is only known from fragmentary specimens. In phylogenic analyses it has been found to the basal most choristodere.

- Choristodera
  - Cteniogenys
  - - Neochoristodera
      - Ikechosaurus pijiagouensis
      - Ikechosaurus sunailinae
      - Tchoiria namsari
      - Tchoiria klauseni
      - Champsosaurus
        - C. gigas
        - C. albertensis
      - Simoedosaurus
        - S. lemoinei
        - S. dakotensis
    - - Coeruleodraco
      - - Monjurosuchus splendens (specimen BMNHC 073)
        - Monjurosuchus splendens (specimen DR0003C)
        - Philydrosaurus
          - P. proseilus (specimen PKUP V2001)
          - P. proseilus (specimen LPMC021)
        - Lazarussuchus
          - L. inexpectatus
          - Lazarussuchus sp.
          - L. dvoraki
        - Khurendukhosaurus orlovi
        - Hyphalosaurus sp. (specimen IVPP 14560)
        - - Hyphalosaurus lingyuanensis (specimen IVPP 11075)
          - Shokawa ikoi

== See also ==
- Paleobiota of the Morrison Formation
