= Khuren Dukh Formation =

Geological formation in Mongolia

- Stratigraphic range: Early Cretaceous (Aptian–Albian), 119.7–100 Ma
- Type: Geological formation
- Sub-units: Lower, Middle & Upper Members
- Underlies: Terrace deposit, Basalt
- Overlies: Khalzan Uul Formation, Basement
- Thickness: Over 100 m (330 ft)

Lithology
- Primary: Sandstone, conglomerate, siltstone, mudstone

Location
- Coordinates: 45.9°N 108.4°E
- Approximate paleocoordinates: 49.3°N 100.2°E
- Region: Dornogovi Province
- Country: Mongolia
- Extent: Choyr Basin
- Khuren Dukh Formation (Mongolia)

The Khuren Dukh Formation, also known as the Khukhtyk Formation, Khukhteeg Formation, or Hühteeg Svita, (Mongolian: Хөхтээг формаци, Khökhteeg Formatsi), is a geological formation in Mongolia whose strata date back to the Aptian–Albian ages of the Early Cretaceous. Dinosaur remains are among the fossils that have been recovered from the formation.

== Fossil cotent ==
Color key: Taxon / Reclassified taxon / Taxon falsely reported as present / Dubious taxon or junior synonym / Ichnotaxon / Ootaxon / Morphotaxon	Notes; Uncertain or tentative taxa are in small text; ~~crossed out~~ taxa are discredited.

=== Dinosaurs ===
==== Ornithischians ====
Ornithischians of the Khuren Dukh Formation
Genus	Species	Location	Stratigraphic position	Material	Notes	Image
Altirhinus	A. kurzanovi			"Complete skull, partial skull, associated postcrania, several individuals".	A hadrosauroid ornithopod	
Choyrodon	C. barsboldi			Partial skull, cervical ribs.	A hadrosauroid ornithopod	
Iguanodon	I. orientalis				An indeterminate Iguanodontian; a referred skull was reclassified as Altirhinus.	
Zavacephale	Z. rinpoche			Skull and partial articulated skeleton.	An early pachycephalosaur	

==== Theropods ====
Theropods of the Khuren Dukh Formation
Genus	Species	Location	Stratigraphic position	Material	Notes	Image
Harpymimus	H. okladnikovi			Partial skeleton.	A ornithomimosaurian theropod	

=== Choristoderes ===
Choristoderes of the Khuren Dukh Formation
Genus	Species	Location	Stratigraphic position	Material	Notes	Image
Khurendukhosaurus	K. orlovi			Partial skeleton.	A long-necked choristodere	
Khurendukhosaurus	Indeterminate			Partial skeleton.	A long-necked choristodere	
Tchoiria	T. namsarai				A crocodile-like neochoristoderan choristodere	

== See also ==
- List of dinosaur-bearing rock formations
