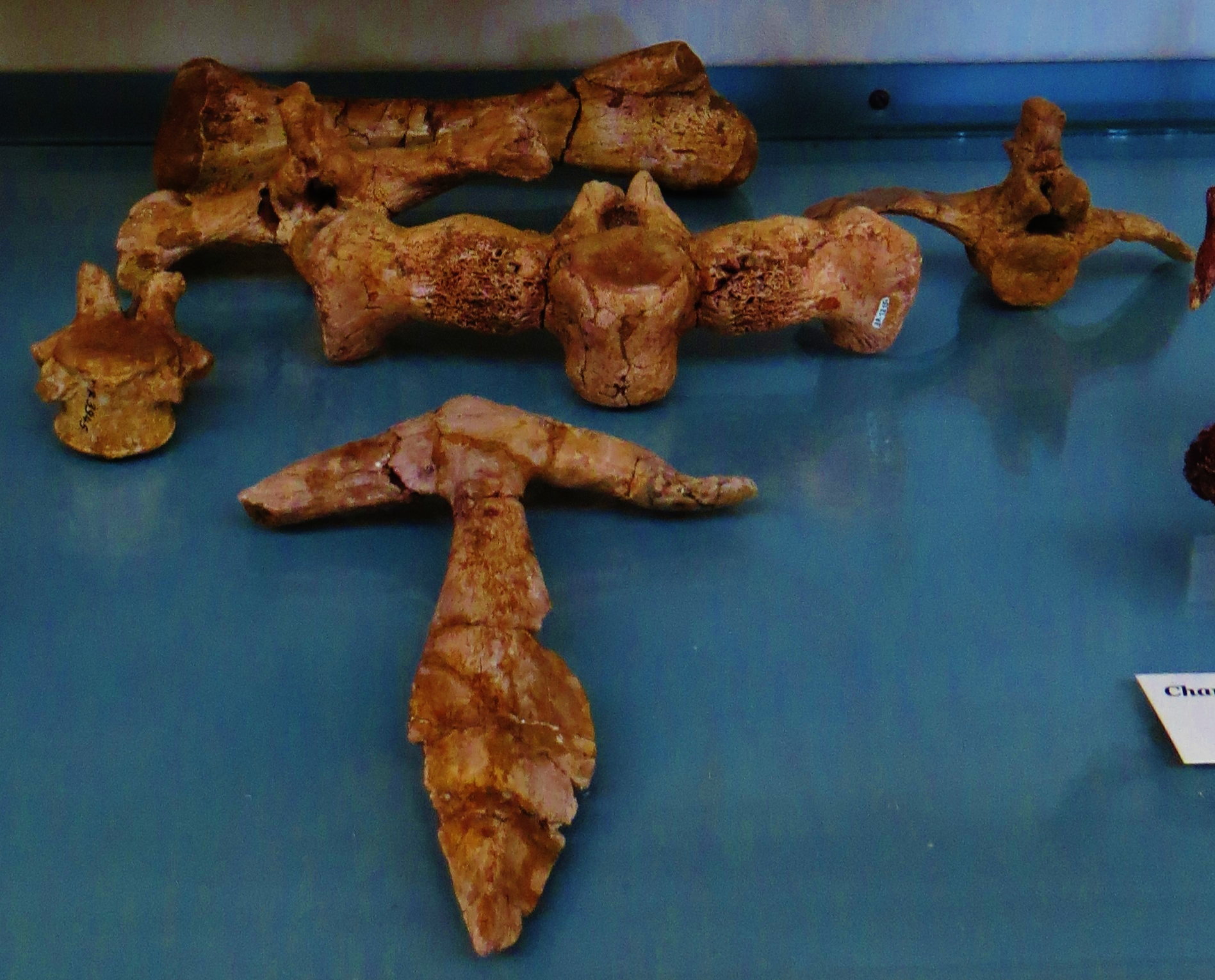
- Fossil

Scientific classification
- Kingdom: Animalia
- Phylum: Chordata
- Class: Reptilia
- Order: †Choristodera
- Suborder: †Neochoristodera
- Genus: †Simoedosaurus; Gervais, 1877

Type species
- †Simoedosaurus lemoinei Gervais, 1877

= Simoedosaurus =

Simoedosaurus Temporal range: 66–56 Ma Paleocene-Eocene

Extinct genus of reptiles

Simoedosaurus is an extinct reptile known from the Paleocene of North America, Europe and western Asia, and a member of the Choristodera, a group of aquatic reptiles that lived in the Northern Hemisphere from the Jurassic to the early Cenozoic.

A second species, S. dakotensis got its own genus, Kosmodraco, in 2022.

== Taxonomy ==
French paleontologist Paul Gervais described Simoedosaurus in 1877.

Though similar to and contemporaneous, Simoedosaurus is not closely related to the North American Champsosaurus, instead it appears to be most closely related to Tchoiria and Ikechosaurus from the Early Cretaceous of Asia. It therefore may represent a species that immigrated into North America from Asia in the wake of the Cretaceous-Tertiary mass extinction event, though the absence of choristoderes in the Late Cretaceous of Asia makes this merely a paleogeographical speculation.

== Biology ==
Simoedosaurus was an aquatic predator, specialised to a fully aquatic lifestyle; though Champsosaurus might have still come ashore to lay eggs, ovovivipary is known in other choristoderes. It in particular possesses broader, stronger jaws than other longirostrine choristoderes, including its closest relatives, suggesting that it was capable of tackling larger prey.

Simoedosaurus does occur in sites where aquatic crocodilians are present, including brevirostrine forms like Borealosuchus; the extent of competition between both groups, if there was any, is still unresolved.

Like other neo-choristoderes it has nasal conchae, suggesting it could regulate its own body temperature, explaining its ability to live in cold waters.

== Range ==
The earliest records of Simoedosaurus are from the Early Paleocene (Puercan Land Mammal Age) of Saskatchewan. It persisted until the Late Palaecene in North America, and has also been found in the Late Paleocene of France. The youngest remains seem to occur in the Eocene of Kazakhstan.
