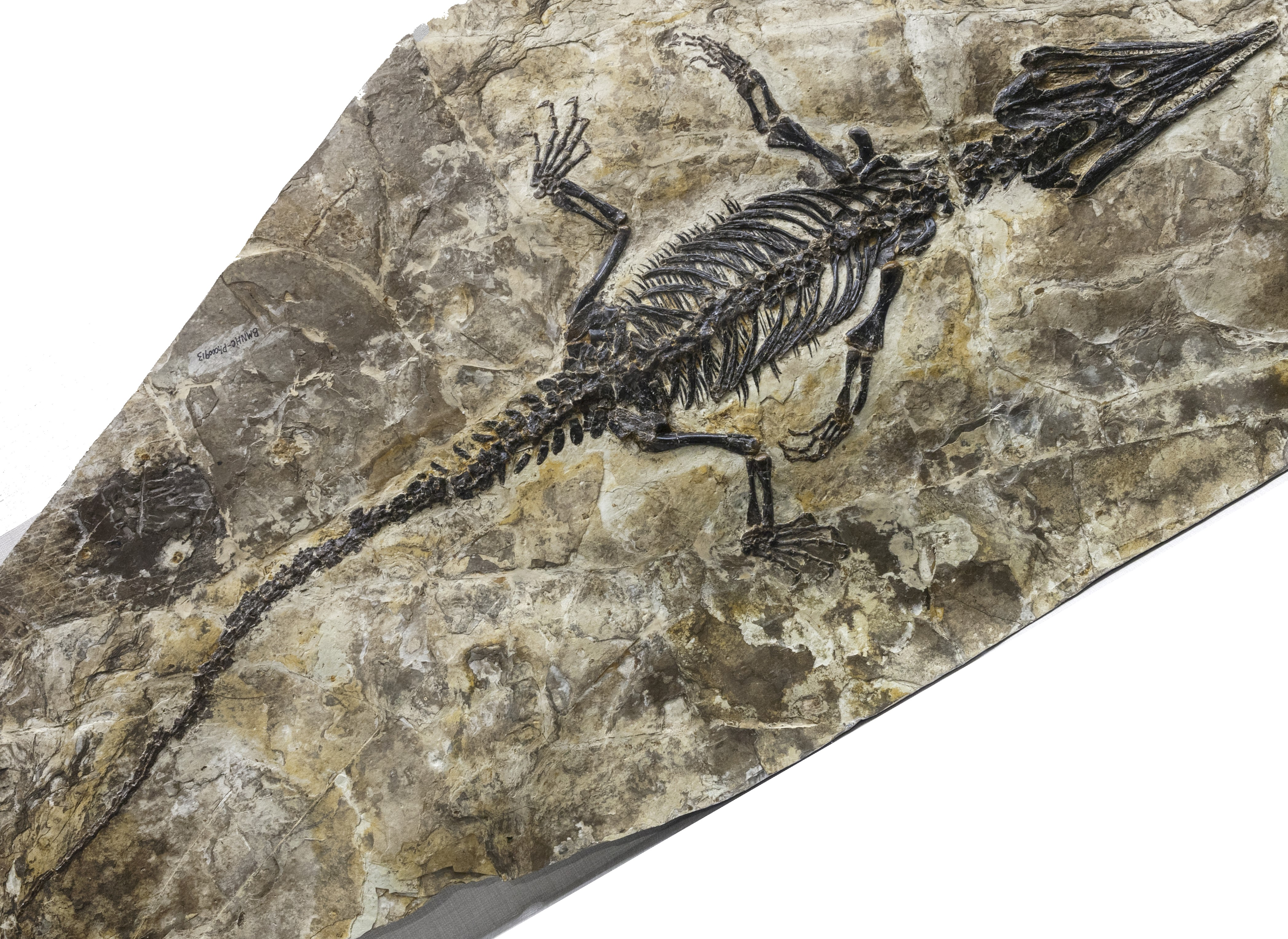
- Fossil specimen, Beijing Museum of Natural History

Scientific classification
- Kingdom: Animalia
- Phylum: Chordata
- Class: Reptilia
- Order: †Choristodera
- Suborder: †Neochoristodera
- Genus: †Ikechosaurus; Sigogneau-Russell, 1981

Type species
- †Ikechosaurus sunailinae Sigogneau-Russell, 1981

Other species
- †I. magnus (Efimov, 1979) [Formerly belong to Tchoiria]; †I.. gaoi Lü, Kobayashi & Li, 1999; †I. pijiagouensis Liu, 2004

= Ikechosaurus =

Ikechosaurus Temporal range: Valanginian–Aptian

Extinct genus of reptiles

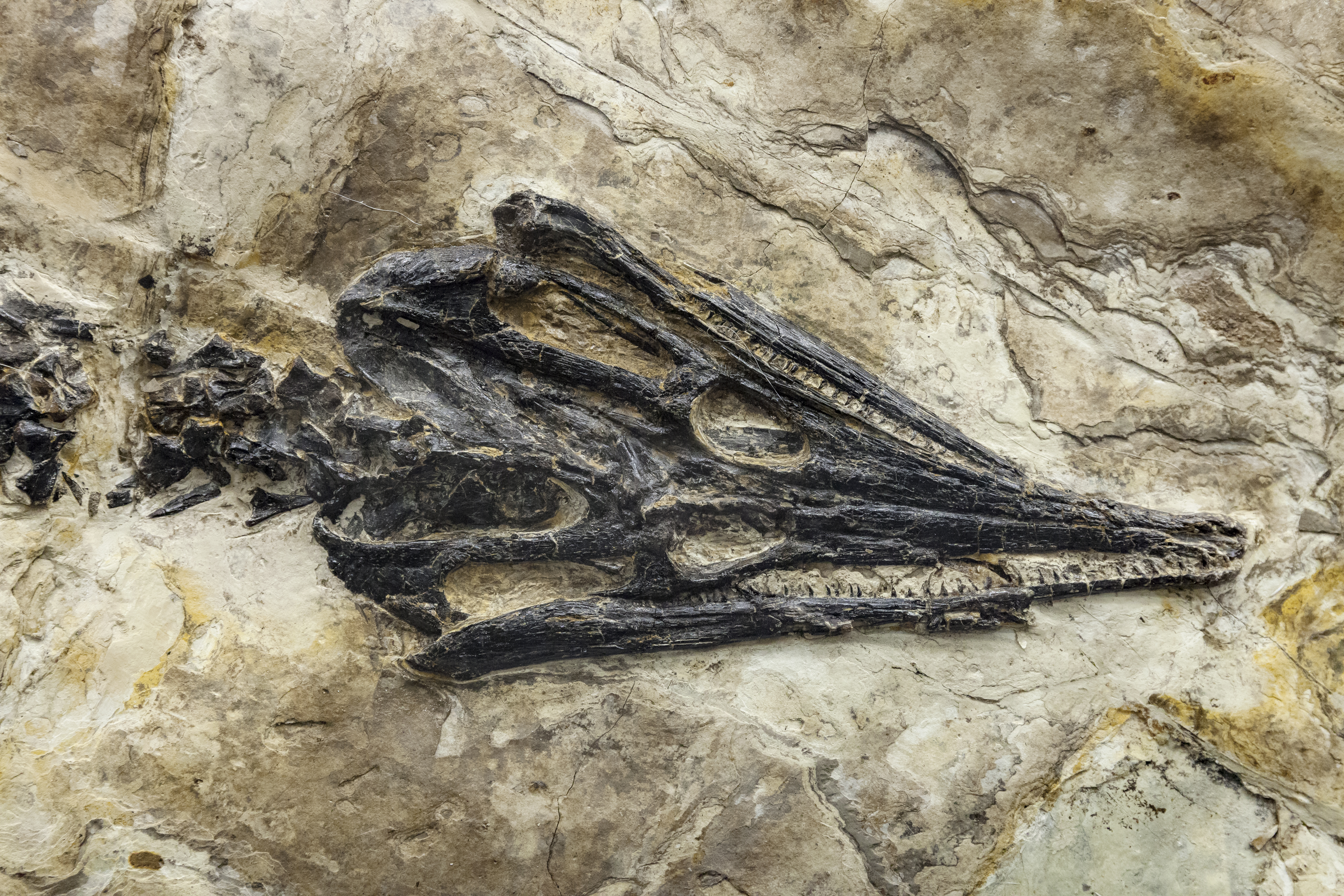
Closeup of the skull

Ikechosaurus (meaning "Ikh Juu lizard", in reference to the discovery locality of type species) is an extinct genus of choristodere reptile which existed in China and Mongolia during the Early Cretaceous. It contains four species: I. sunailinae, I. magnus, I. gaoi, and I. pijiagouensis. It belongs to the crocodilian-like clade Neochoristodera and was initially assigned to the Champsosauridae by palaeontologist Denise Sigogneau-Russell in 1981. Compared to other neochoristoderes, Ikechosaurus has a rather simple dentition, lacking the speciations seen in latter species. It also has parasphenoid palatal teeth, a feature not seen in any other choristodere.
