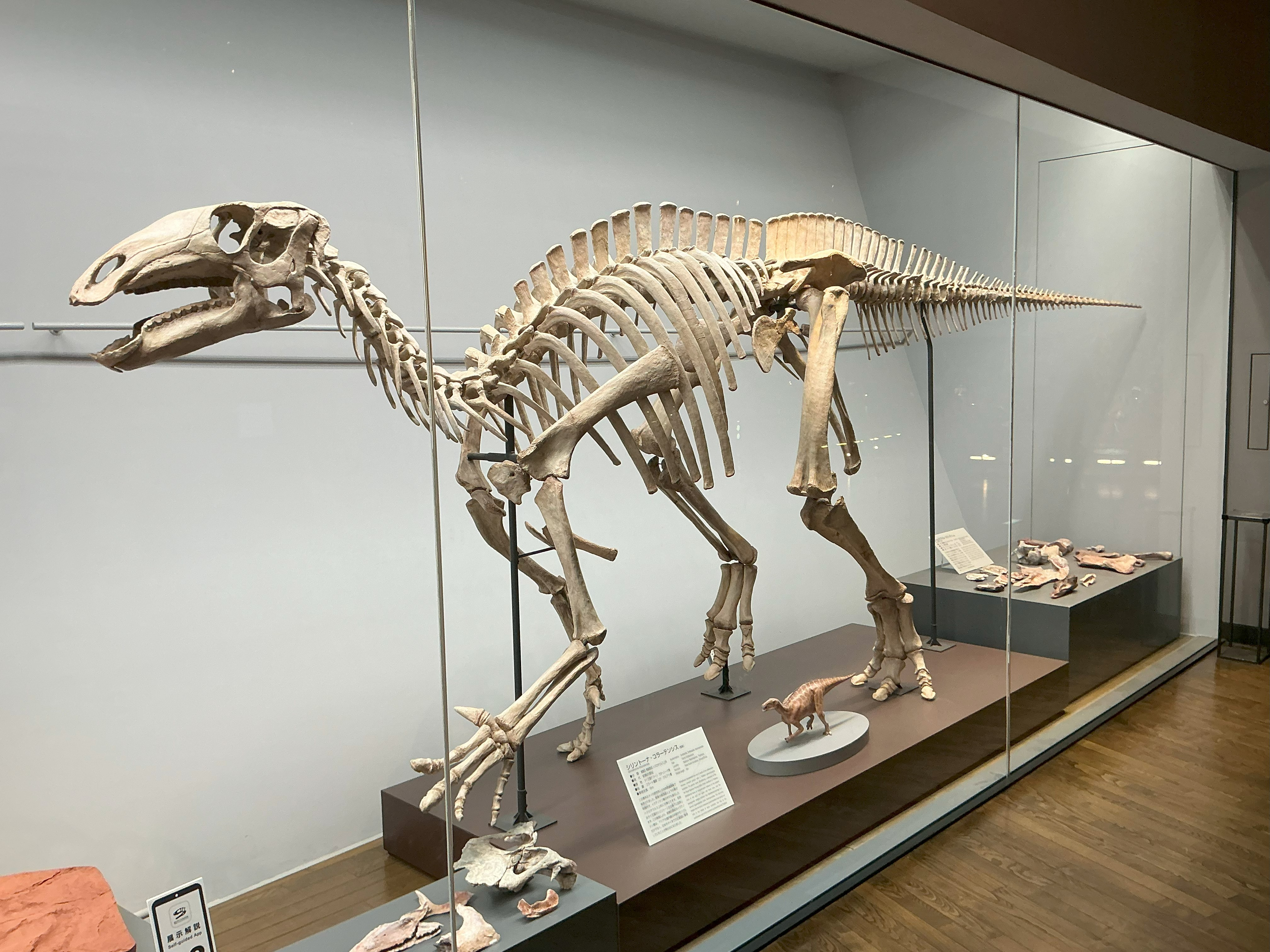
- Skeletal mount in Fukui Prefectural Dinosaur Museum

Scientific classification
- Kingdom: Animalia
- Phylum: Chordata
- Class: Reptilia
- Clade: Dinosauria
- Clade: †Ornithischia
- Clade: †Ornithopoda
- Superfamily: †Hadrosauroidea
- Genus: †Sirindhorna; Shibata, Jintasakul, Azuma & You, 2015

Type species
- †Sirindhorna khoratensis Shibata, Jintasakul, Azuma & You, 2015

= Sirindhorna =

Sirindhorna Temporal range: Aptian ~120–113 Ma

Extinct genus of dinosaurs

Sirindhorna is a genus of hadrosauroid ornithopod dinosaur from Early Cretaceous deposits of northeastern Thailand.

== Discovery and naming ==
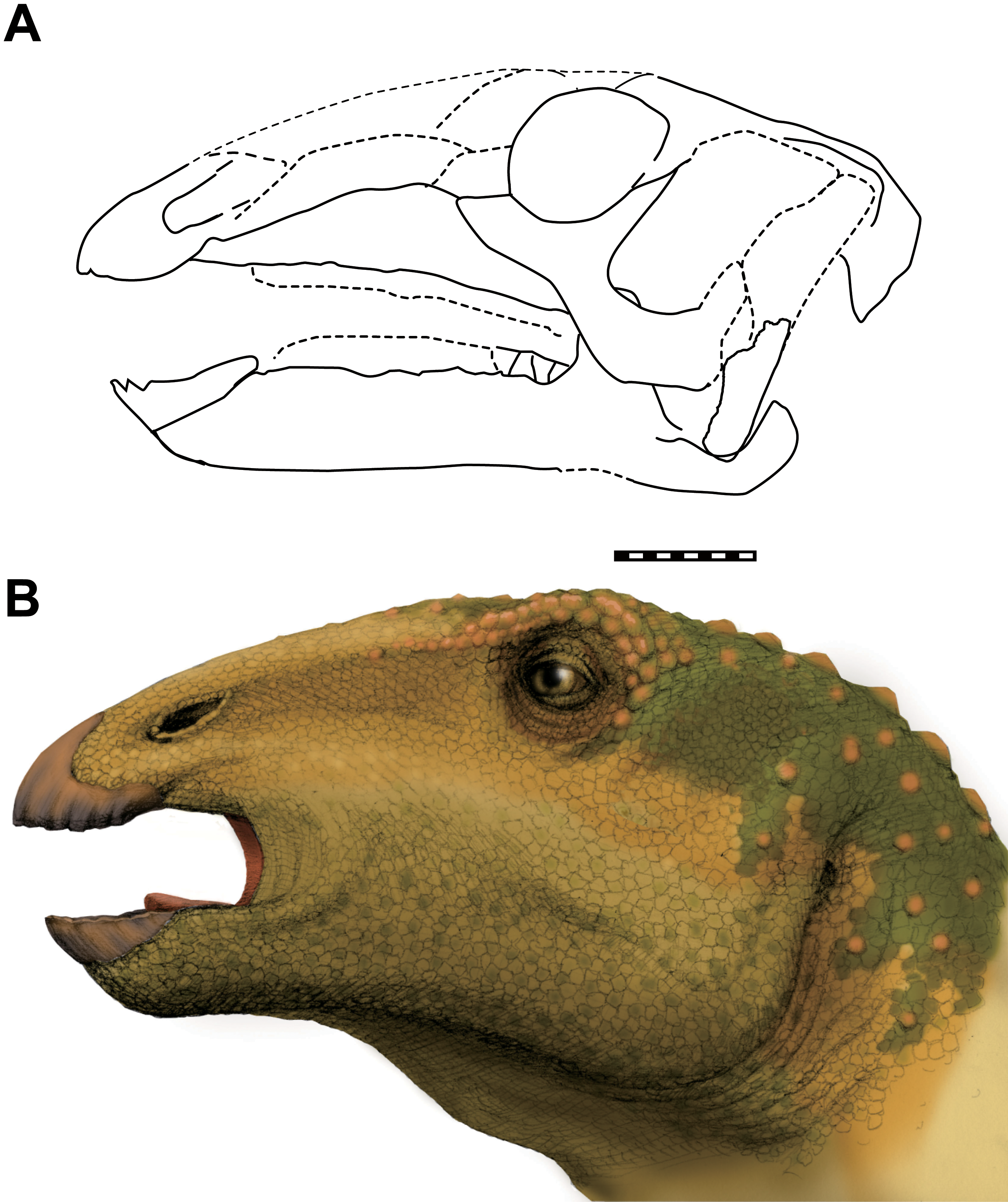
A: skull diagram B: life restoration

In 2007, the Fukui Prefectural Dinosaur Museum (FPDM) approached the Northeastern Research Institute of Petrified Woods and Mineral Resources, Nakhon Ratchasima Rajabhat University (NRRU) and associated Khorat Fossil Museum on the possibility of a collaboration. The motivation for such an effort was because of the similar age of rocks in Suranaree Subdistrict, Nakhon Ratchasima Province, Thailand and Katsuayama, Fukui Prefecture, Japan. Similar dinosaurs are known from the formations of both locales, and so the researchers wanted to collaborate in research to be able to more deeply compare the prehistory of both countries. The collaboration was approved as the Japan-Thailand Dinosaur Project (JTDP), and this contributed to the basis of the founding of the Asia Dinosaur Association in 2013, by which time over 30,000 fossils had been found by the joint effort.

The fossils of Sirindhorna were collected as part of the JTDP, at the Ban Saphan Hin site of the Khok Kruat Formation; the dating of the formation is uncertain (as index fossils have proven rare), but it's thought to mostly likely date the Aptian stage of the late Early Cretaceous Period, between 125 and 112 million years ago. The formation does not usually crop out in the Nakhon Ratchasima province, where the geologic features are covered in a layer of thin red soil (local legend claims this colour is from the blood of dinosaurs); Early Cretaceous bedrock in Suranaree is generally found around a metre below ground level. The locality of the Sirindhorna bonebed is usually used for farming of maize and tapioca. Digging to make a reservoir, farmers happened upon dinosaur fossils. Researchers re-identified the bonebed's location and gathered information on taphonomy and other fossils found there, pertaining to various vertebrates but not any plants or invertebrates. Farming was not conducted while fossil excavation was conducted.

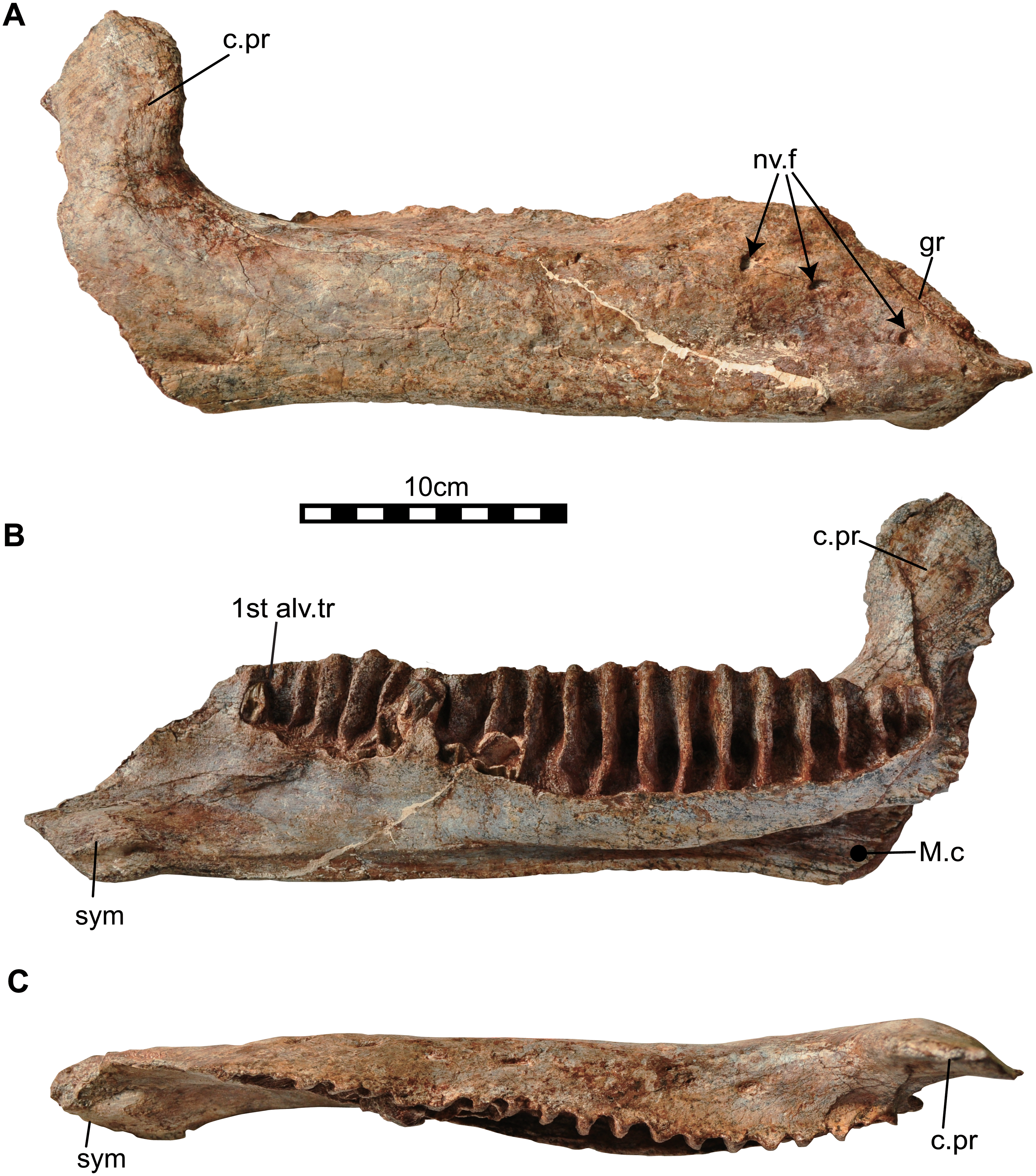
Right dentary bone from three angles

Described in 2015 by Japanese, Thai, and Chinese palaeontologists Masateru Shibata, Pratueng Jintasakul, Yoichi Azuma and Hai-Lu You, Sirindhorna was one of eighteen dinosaur taxa from the year to be described in an open access or free-to-read journal. It's the third species of iguanodont found in Thailand, following Siamodon and Ratchasimasaurus, both known from poorer material, and the first ornithopod from Southeast Asia to have a well-preserved skull. The type and only species of the genus is Sirindhorna khoratensis. The taxon is known from the holotype specimen NRRU3001-166, an articulated braincase, as well as a number of disarticulated referred specimens. The material known from these referred specimens consists of three more partial braincases, one with an articulated postorbital, one right premaxilla, a left and right maxilla, a right jugal, surangular, and quadrate, one predentary, a right and left dentary, and assorted teeth. The generic name is dedication to Princess Maha Chakri Sirindhorn for her contribution to the support and encouragement of palaeontology in Thailand. The specific name is derived from Khorat, the informal name of Nakhon Ratchasima Province.

The ilium and ischium of S. khoratensis still remains undescribed.
