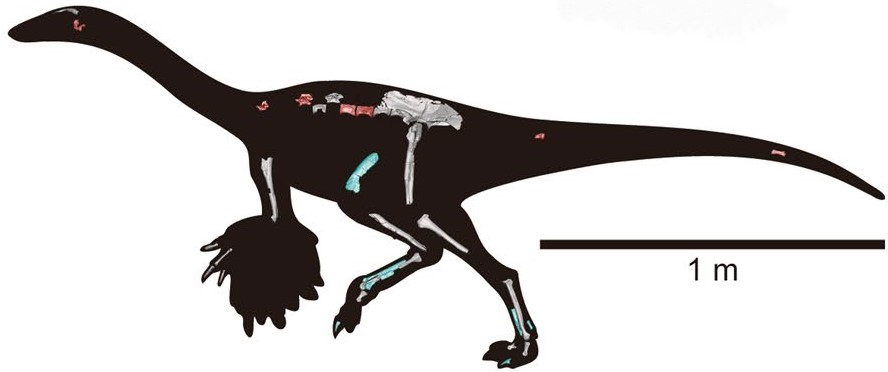
- Diagram of known fossil material

Scientific classification
- Kingdom: Animalia
- Phylum: Chordata
- Class: Reptilia
- Clade: Dinosauria
- Clade: Saurischia
- Clade: Theropoda
- Clade: †Ornithomimosauria
- Family: †Deinocheiridae
- Genus: †Tyrannomimus; Hattori et al., 2023
- Species: †T. fukuiensis

Binomial name
- †Tyrannomimus fukuiensis Hattori et al., 2023

= Tyrannomimus =

Tyrannomimus Temporal range: Early Cretaceous, Aptian

Extinct genus of ornithomimosaurian dinosaurs

Tyrannomimus (meaning "tyrant mimic") is an extinct genus of ornithomimosaurian theropod dinosaurs from the Early Cretaceous (Aptian age) Kitadani Formation of Japan. The type species is Tyrannomimus fukuiensis.

== Discovery and naming ==
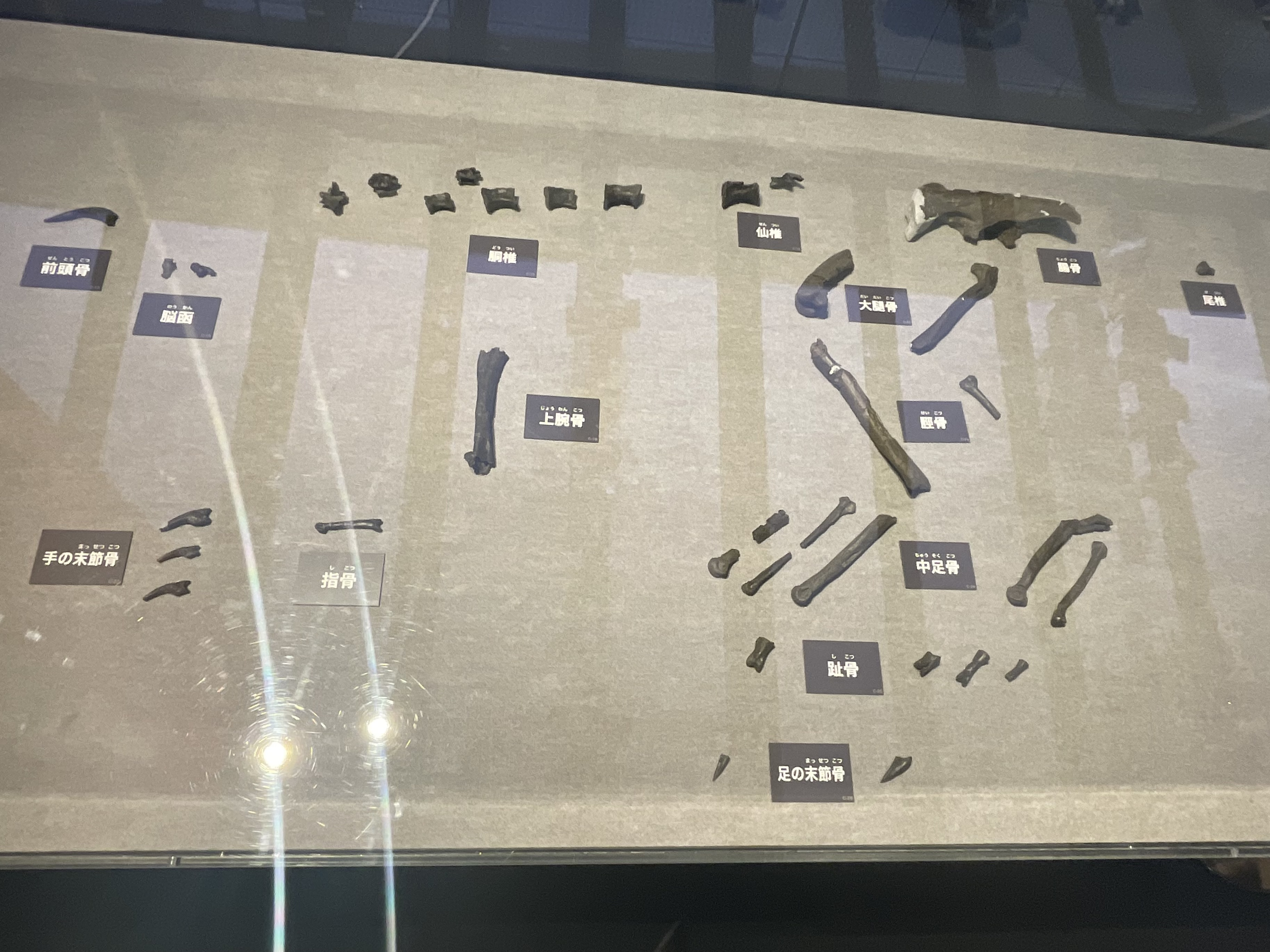
Known fossil elements

Tyrannomimus is based on the holotype FPDM-V-11311, a partial postrcranial skeleton. Multiple referred specimens are also known.

They were named as a new genus and species of ornithomimosaur in 2023. The generic name, "Tyrannomimus", is a reference to its morphological similarities with tyrannosauroids, particularly the vertical ridge of the ilium previously believed to be a synapomorphy of that clade and shared with Aviatyrannis. The specific name, "fukuiensis", refers to Fukui Prefecture where the fossils were found.

== Classification ==
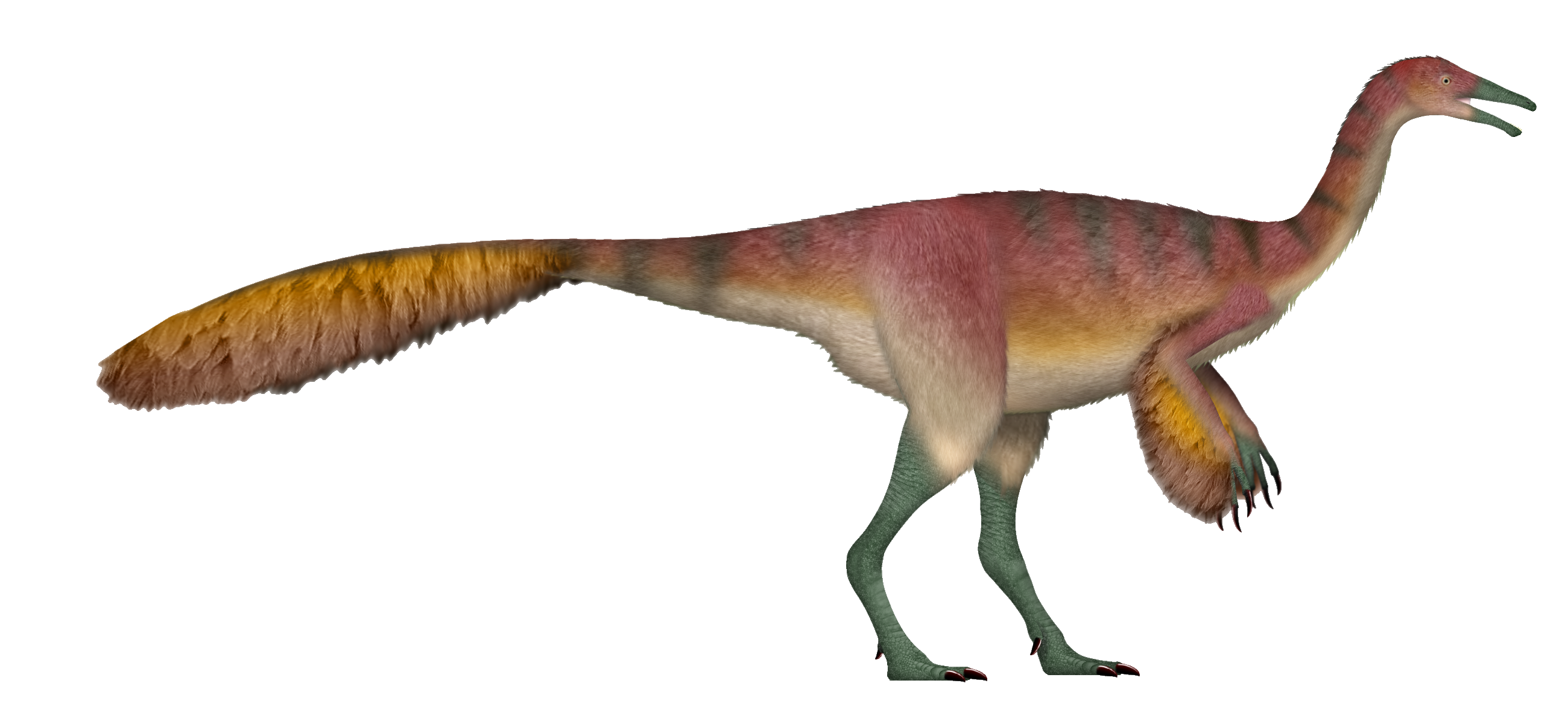
Life restoration

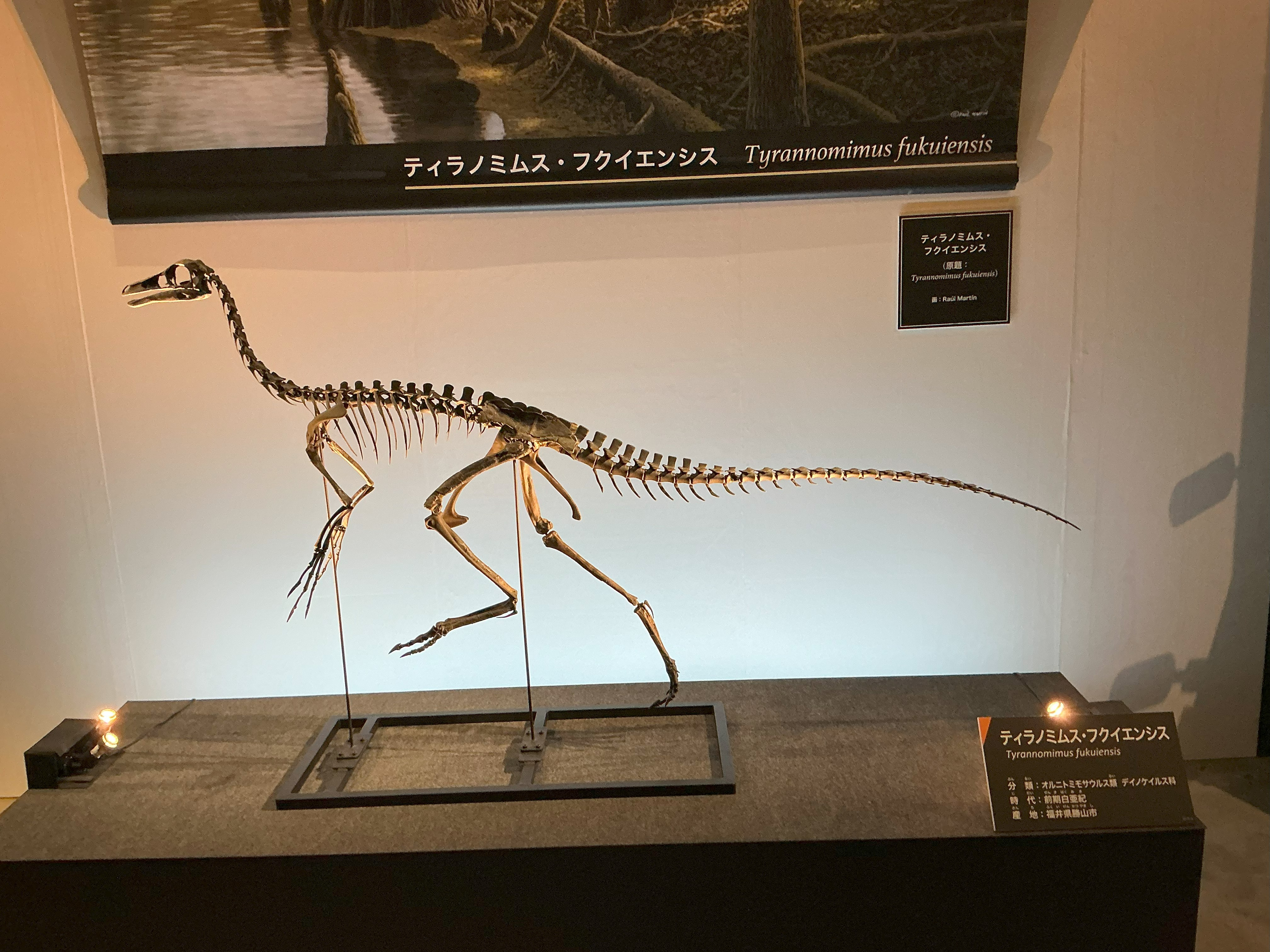
Reconstructed skeleton, Fukui Prefectural Dinosaur Museum

Tyrannomimus was entered in a phylogenetic analysis by Hattori et al. (2023) and placed within the family Deinocheiridae, as the sister taxon to Harpymimus. Their cladogram is shown below:

- Ornithomimosauria
  - Nqwebasaurus
  - Pelecanimimus
  - Shenzhousaurus
  - Beishanlong
  - LH-02-01
  - Deinocheiridae
    - - Tyrannomimus
      - Harpymimus
    - - Garudimimus
      - Deinocheirus
      - Paraxenisaurus
  - Ornithomimidae
    - Archaeornithomimus
    - - Dzharacursor
      - - Sinornithomimus
        - Rativates
        - Struthiomimus
        - Gallimimus
        - Anserimimus
        - Ornithomimus
        - Qiupalong

Although it wasn't included in the dataset, Hattori et al. also consider Aviatyrannis to be a basal ornithomimosaur due to its similarities with Tyrannomimus.

== Paleoenvironment ==
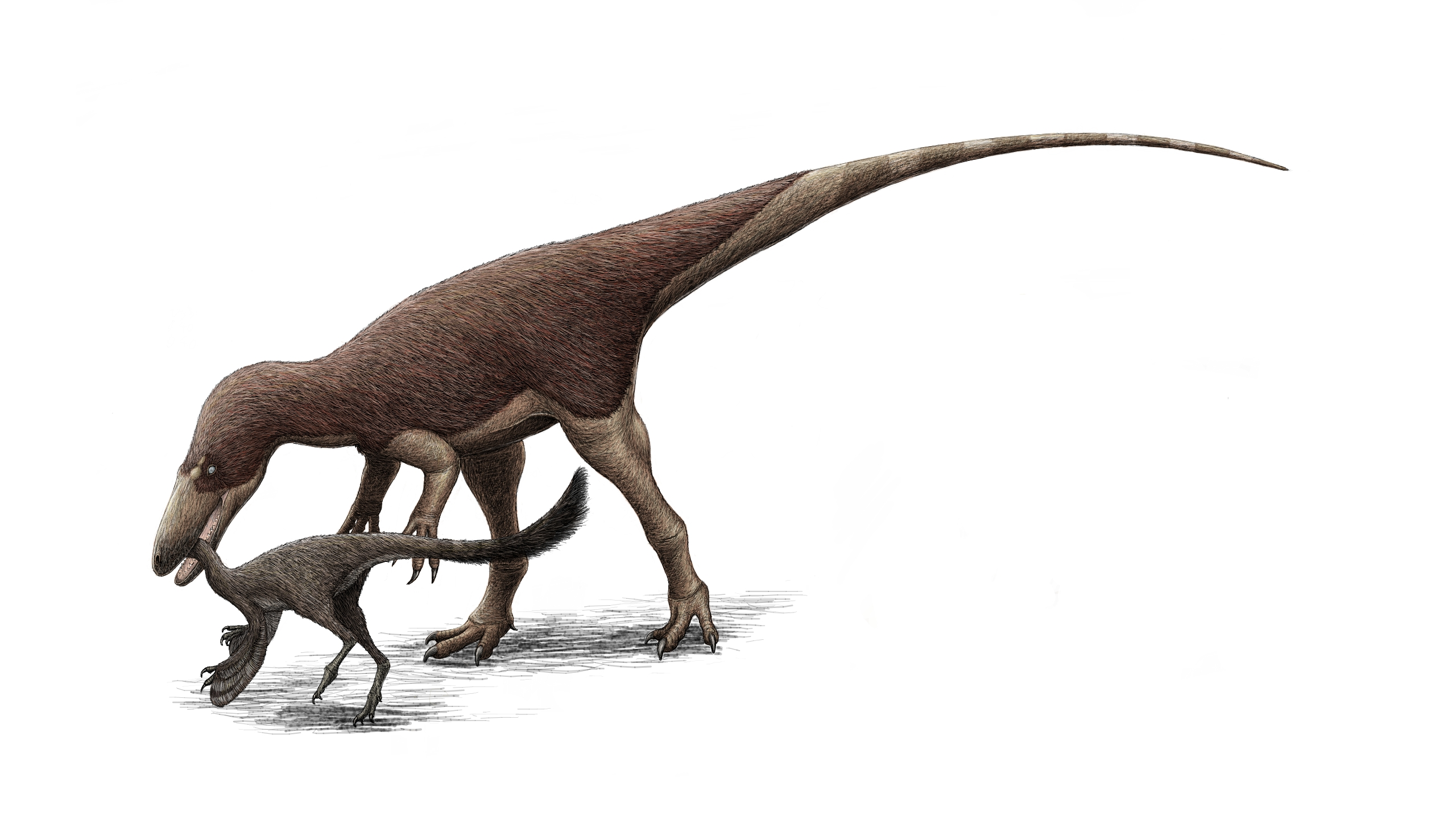
Life restoration of Tyrannomimus being hunted by Fukuiraptor

Tyrannomimus lived alongside a diverse assemblage of animals, most of which are named after Fukui Prefecture. These include the sauropod Fukuititan, the ornithopods Fukuisaurus and Koshisaurus, and the theropods Fukuiraptor, Fukuivenator, and Fukuipteryx.
