= Plagioolithus =

Plagioolithus Temporal range: Upper Barremian

Egg fossil classification
- Oofamily: incertae sedis
- Oogenus: †Plagioolithus; Imai and Azuma, 2015

Oospecies
- †Plagioolithus fukuiensis Imai and Azuma, 2015 (type)

Oogenus of fossil egg

Plagioolithus is an oogenus of fossil egg. It is from the Early Cretaceous of Japan. It was probably laid by a bird, making it the oldest known fossil bird egg.

== Description ==
Plagioolithus is most notable for having a three-layered eggshell. This trait is widespread in modern birds, but is very rare among Mesozoic fossil eggs. No complete eggs have been found, so the size and shape of Plagioolithus eggs are unknown. Its eggshell is unornamented and very thin, measuring only 0.44 mm thick. The shell consists of a 0.18 mm mammillary layer (the innermost layer of the shell), a 0.18 mm continuous layer, and a 0.08 mm external layer. The pores are narrow, straight, and constant width throughout the shell.

== Parentage ==
Because no embryos are known, the parent of Plagioolithus cannot be identified with certainty. It was formerly believed that triple-layered eggshells were unique to neognath birds, but some three-layered eggs have been found containing enantiornithines and non-avian theropods, indicating that the presence of a third layer is plesiomorphic among dinosaurs. Therefore, this trait alone cannot be used to assign P. fukuiensis to birds. However, the combination of the third layer, the thin shell, and the smooth external surface suggests that Plagioolithus belongs to a bird (though to what type of bird remains unknown).

== Distribution ==
Plagioolithus is only known from a single formation, the Kitadani Formation in Fukui, Japan. The date of this formation has generated controversy, but multiple lines of evidence support a Barremian age: zircon fission track dating places a correlated formation (the Bessandani Formation) at 127 million years old. Also, the presence of Nippononaia ryosekiana and the types of charophytes suggest a Barremian age.

== Paleobiology ==
Even though birds are known to be as old as the Late Jurassic, fossil eggs from before the Late Cretaceous are very rare. Indeed, Plagioolithus is the oldest known trace of bird eggs in the fossil record.

At the Kitadani Formation, numerous other dinosaurs are known to have coexisted with Plagioolithus, including Fukuiraptor, Fukuisaurus, Fukuititan, Koshisaurus, and an unidentified type of non-avian theropod. Also present were goniopholidid crocodiles, eucryptodire turtles, and amiiform fish. Footprints of various amphibians, dinosaurs, birds, and pterosaurs are known from the Kitadani Formation.
