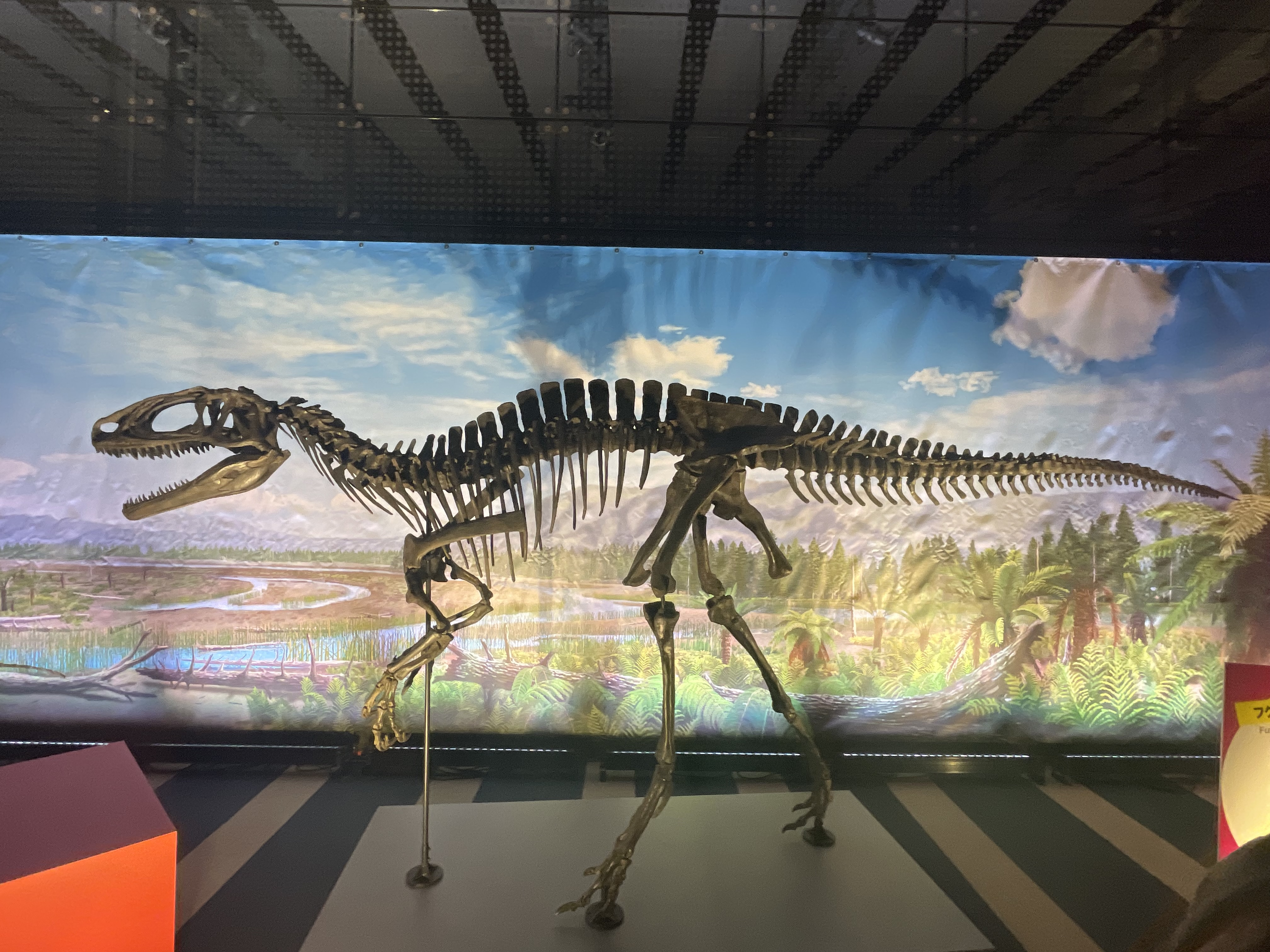
- Reconstructed skeleton

Scientific classification
- Kingdom: Animalia
- Phylum: Chordata
- Class: Reptilia
- Clade: Dinosauria
- Clade: Saurischia
- Clade: Theropoda
- Clade: †Megaraptora
- Genus: †Fukuiraptor; Azuma & Currie, 2000

Type species
- †Fukuiraptor kitadaniensis Azuma & Currie, 2000

= Fukuiraptor =

Fukuiraptor Temporal range: Early Cretaceous, 125–115 Ma

Genus of theropod dinosaur

Fukuiraptor ("thief of Fukui") is an Early Cretaceous (either Barremian or Aptian) genus of medium-sized megaraptoran theropod dinosaur from the Kitadani Formation and possibly the Sebayashi Formationof Japan. Fukuiraptor may have been one of the basalmost members of Megaraptora, or a sister taxon to Australovenator.

== History ==
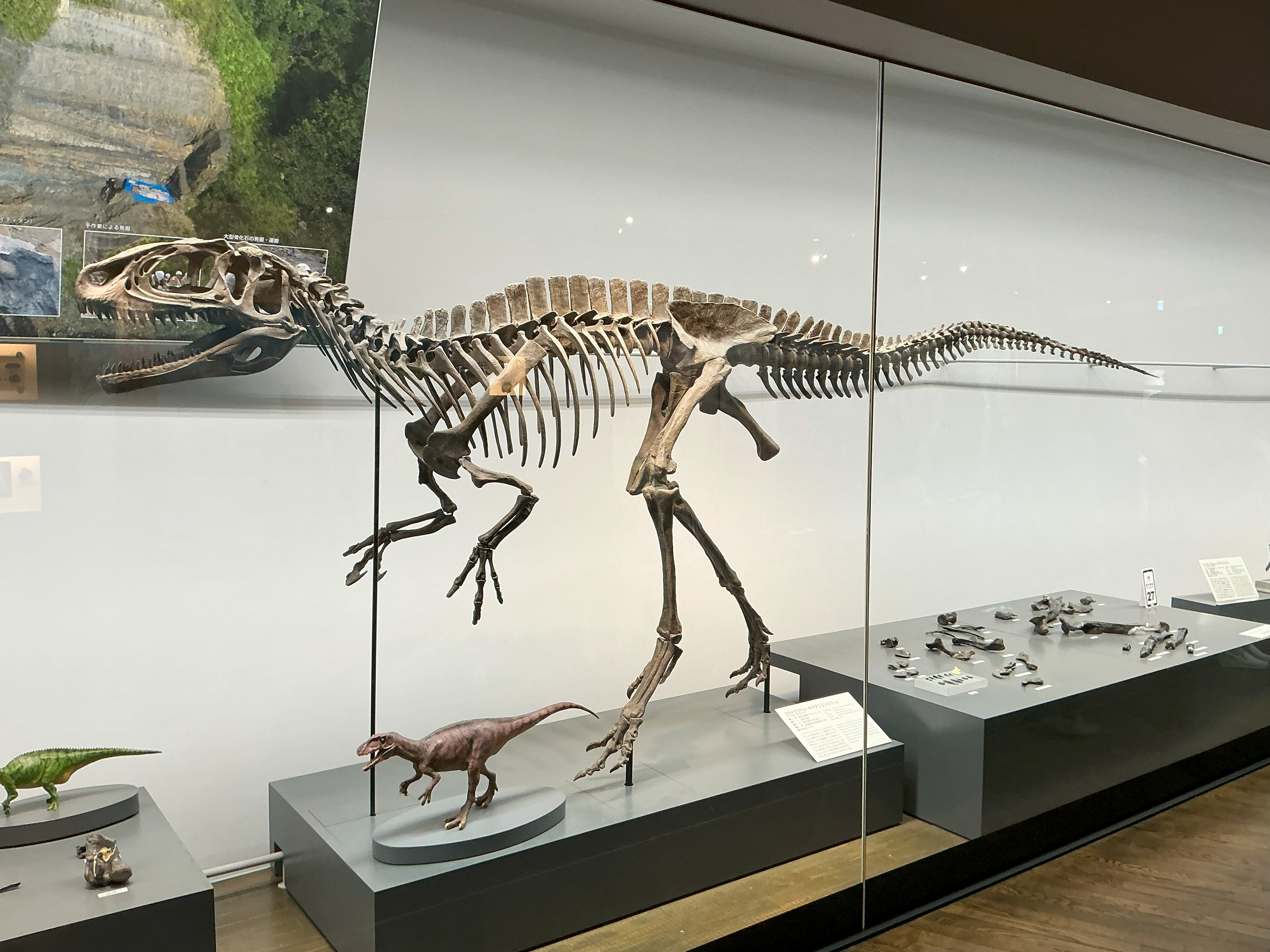
Reconstructed skeleton and holotype fossils on the lower right

The type specimen is a partial skeleton (designated FPDM-V97122) discovered in the Kitadani quarry near Katsuyama in the Fukui prefecture. It is thought that this specimen was not mature and an adult may have been larger. The remains of many other individuals have been found in the quarry, with numerous humeri, femurs, and teeth being assigned to this species. However, the other individuals recovered from the same locality are mostly juveniles that were smaller than the holotype (Azuma & Currie, 2006), in the smallest case less than a quarter of the holotype's size. A tooth (NDC-P0001) discovered in a block of conglomerate from the Sebayashi Formation has been referred to Fukuiraptor as well.

== Description ==
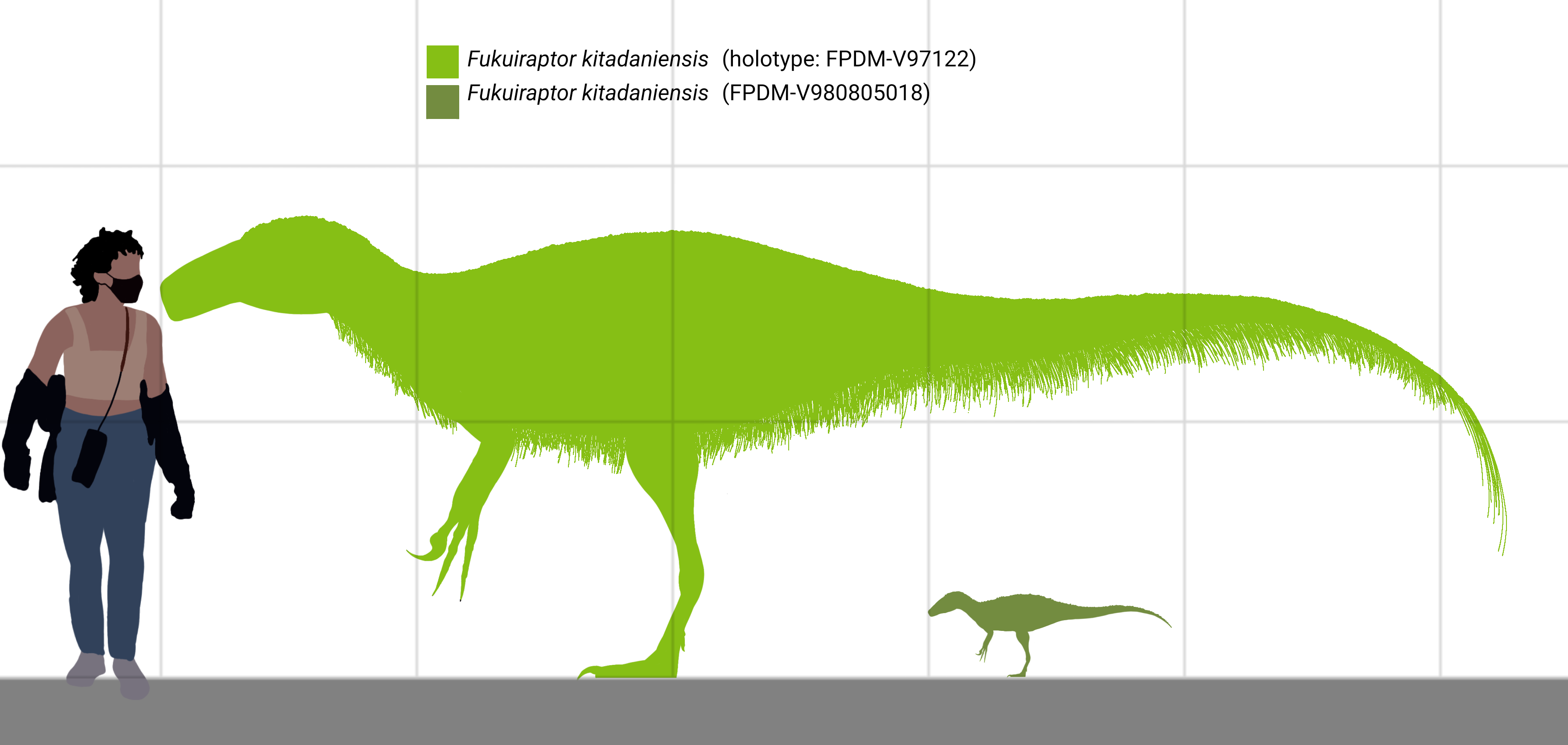
Size comparison

As indicated by its slender phalanges, Fukuiraptor was a relatively lightly built animal, regardless of its maturity. The immature holotype is estimated to reach 4.2 metres (14 ft) long and weigh 175 kg (386 lb) in its initial description. In 2010 Gregory Paul gave a length of 5 meters (16 ft) and a weight of 300 kg (660 lbs). In 2014, its body mass was estimated up to 250 kilograms (550 lb). Molina-Pérez and Larramendi estimated a length of 4.3 meters (14.1 ft) and a weight of 590 kg (1,300 lbs) in 2016.

The distinctive teeth of Fukuiraptor show similarities with both carcharodontosaurids (being very compressed and blade-like, as well as having wrinkled enamel) and tyrannosaurids (having oblique blood grooves near the serrations). The holotype also had very large and flat manual unguals (hand claws), which played a role in its initial classification as a dromaeosaurid (as the hand claws were mistaken for foot claws) as well as its current classification as a megaraptoran.

== Classification ==
Initially considered a member of the Dromaeosauridae when first discovered, its initial describers considered it a carnosaur, related to Allosaurus. More recent studies place it as a megaraptoran, an enigmatic group which may have been part of the family Neovenatoridae. However, more recently, another analysis has proposed that all megaraptorans are tyrannosauroids, which would reclassify Fukuiraptor as a tyrannosauroid coelurosaur. Recent cladistic analysis of the theropod Gualicho has suggested that Fukuiraptor and other megaraptorans are either allosauroids, or non-tyrannosauroid basal coelurosaurs.

- Neovenatoridae
  - Neovenator
  - unnamed
    - Chilantaisaurus
    - Megaraptora
      - - Australovenator
        - Fukuiraptor
      - ?Orkoraptor
      - - Aerosteon
        - Megaraptor

It has been suggested that Fukuiraptor is a close relative of the Australian megaraptoran Australovenator, though later work has placed Australovenator as a megaraptorid megaraptoran alongside other derived South American taxa, while Fukuiraptor remains a megaraptoran outside of Megaraptoridae.

In their 2026 description of the megaraptorid Rinconraptor, Méndez et al. recovered Fukuiraptor as one of the earliest-diverging megaraptorans, as the sister taxon of Vayuraptor. These results are displayed in the cladogram below:

- Megaraptora
  - Phuwiangvenator yaemniyomi
  - - - Fukuiraptor kitadaniensis
      - Vayuraptor nongbualamphuensis
    - Megaraptoridae
      - LRF 100–106
        (Lightning Ridge taxon)
      - - Australovenator wintonensis
        - CLADE A
          - Orkoraptor burkei
          - - Joaquinraptor casali
            - - CLADE B
                - Tratayenia rosalesi
                - - Aerosteon riocoloradensis
                  - Maip macrothorax
              - CLADE C
                - - Murusraptor barrosaensis
                  - UNPSJB-PV 944 & 958
                    (Bajo Barreal Fm. taxon)
                - - Megaraptor namunhuaiquii
                  - Rinconraptor pipoae

== Palaeoecology ==
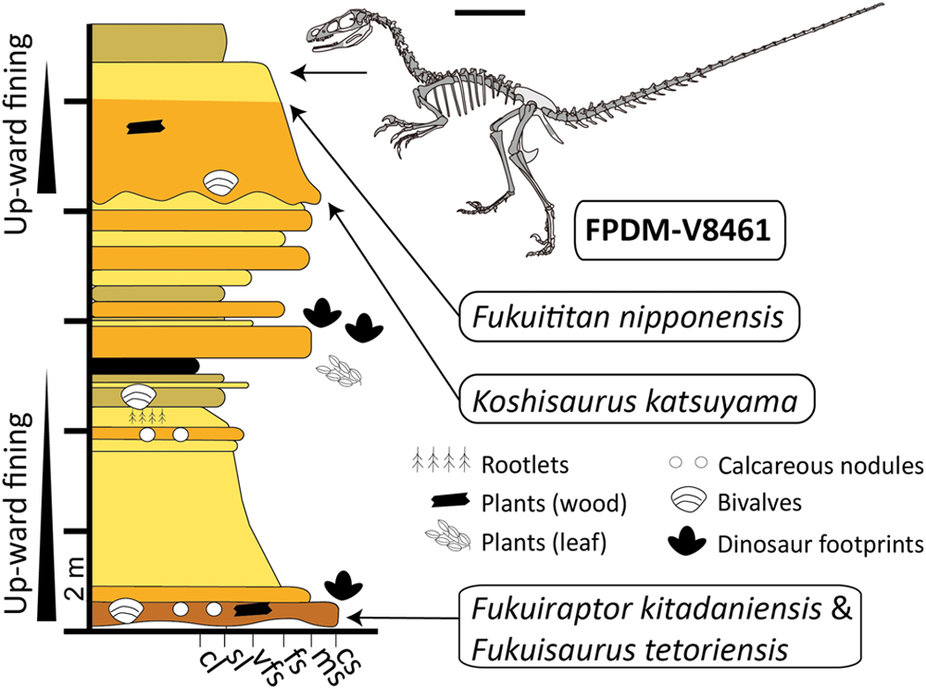
Stratigraphic positions of the non-avialan dinosaurs of the Kitadani Formation, Japan.

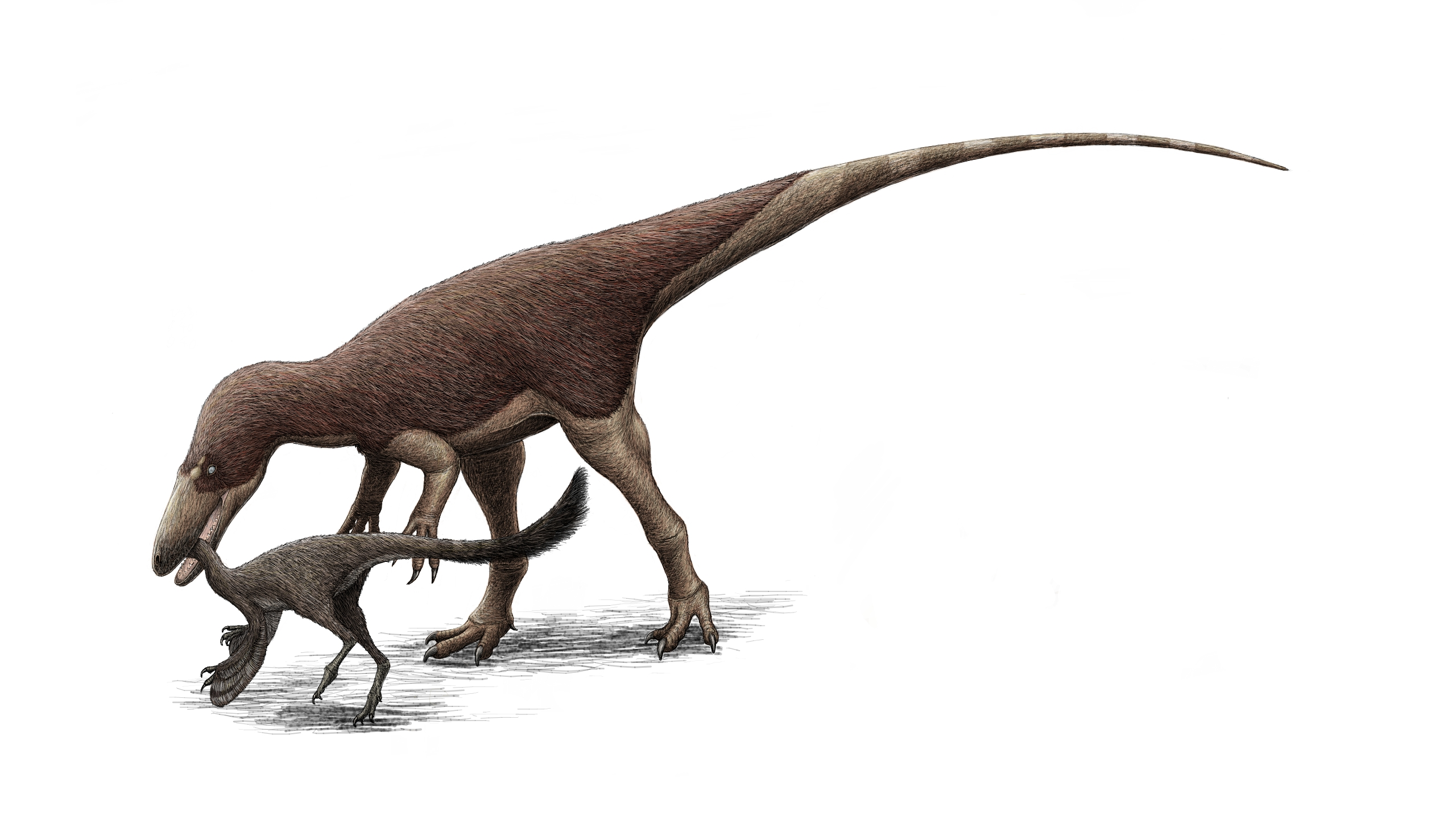
Life restoration of Fukuiraptor hunting Tyrannomimus

In the Kitadani Formation, where fossils of Fukuiraptor have been recovered, fossils of other vertebrates have been preserved. Among the species that have been properly described and named are Fukuisaurus tetoriensis, a styracostern ornithischian, Fukuititan nipponensis, a titanosauriform sauropod, Koshisaurus katsuyama, a hadrosauroid ornithischian, Fukuivenator paradoxus, a possible therizinosaurian theropod, and Fukuipteryx prima, an avialan as defined by the authors.
