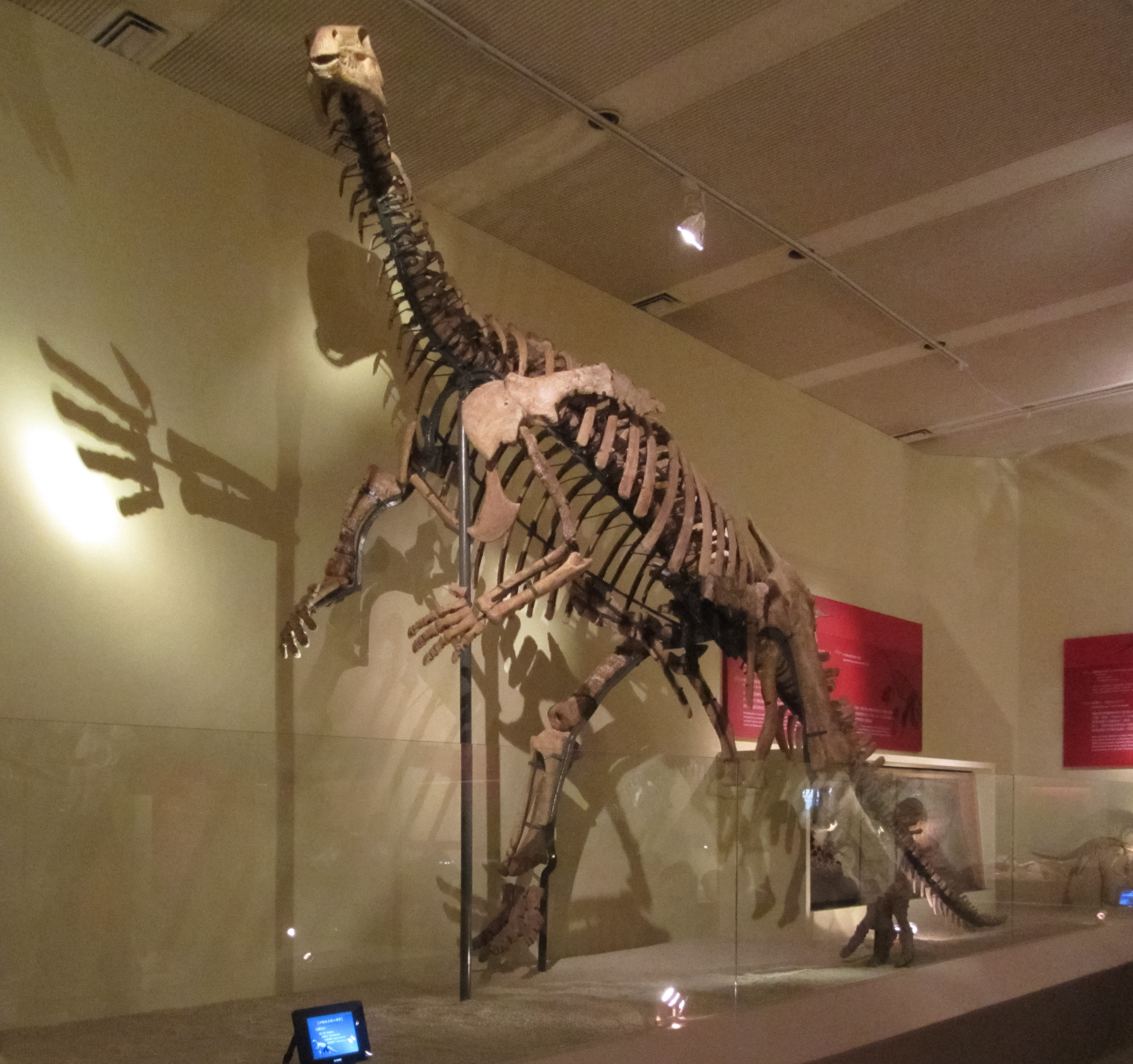
- Restored skeleton

Scientific classification
- Kingdom: Animalia
- Phylum: Chordata
- Class: Reptilia
- Clade: Dinosauria
- Clade: †Ornithischia
- Clade: †Ornithopoda
- Superfamily: †Hadrosauroidea
- Genus: †Xuwulong; You, Li & Liu, 2011
- Species: †X. yueluni

Binomial name
- †Xuwulong yueluni You, Li & Liu, 2011

= Xuwulong =

Xuwulong Temporal range: Early Cretaceous, Aptian

Extinct genus of dinosaurs

Xuwulong is a genus of hadrosauroid dinosaur from the Early Cretaceous period of what is now Yujingzi Basin in the Jiuquan area, Gansu Province of northwestern China. It is known from the holotype, GSGM F00001, an articulated specimen including a complete cranium, almost complete axial skeleton, and complete left pelvic girdle recovered from the Xinminbao Group. Xuwulong was named by You Hailu, Li Daqing, and Liu Weichang in 2011, and the type species is Xuwulong yueluni; the binomial name as a whole refers to Professor Wang Yue-lun; "Xu-wu" is his courtesy name.

== Discovery and naming ==
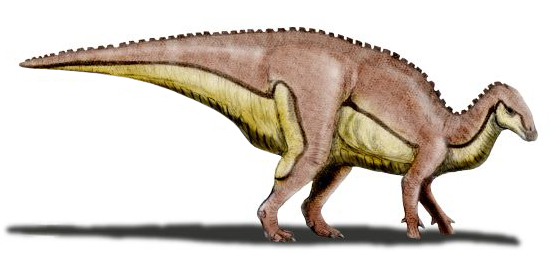
Restoration

Expeditions into the Gansu Province of northwestern China began with the Sino-Swedish Expedition of 1930 to 1931, where discoveries of dinosaurs including the now-dubious early ceratopsian Microceratops sulcidens. These discoveries were followed by occasional observations of dinosaur bones in the Houhongquan Basin in the 1960s, and then the Gongpoquan Basin in 1986. Such observations led to the China-Canada Dinosaur Project taking a reconnaissance trip to the Gongpoquan Basin in 1988, but no further expeditions were led until the Sino-Japanese Silk Road Dinosaur Expedition of 1992 and 1993, led by Chinese paleontology Dong Zhiming of the Institute of Vertebrate Paleontology and Paleoanthropology (IVPP) and Japanese paleontologst Yoichi Azuma of the Fukui Prefectural Dinosaur Museum (FPDM). The Sino-Japanese Dinosaur Project discovered the new early ceratopsian Archaeoceratops, based on a skull and two partial skeletons, as well as many of the unique genera that form the Mazongshan Dinosaur Fauna of the Early Cretaceous of Gansu. Collaborations on the paleontology of the Mazongshan area continued with the Sino-American Mazongshan Dinosaur Project of 1997 to 2000, where the University of Pennsylvania, Carnegie Museum of Natural History and the IVPP collaborated. The Sino-American Dinosaur Project noticed the Yujingzi Basin in 1999 as a potential dinosaur-bearing locality, with the first dinosaur fossils discovered in 2000 by team members including Chinese paleontologist You Hailu of the Institute of Geology of Chinese Academy of Geological Sciences (CAGS). You began collaborations with Chinese paleontologist Li Daqing of the Fossil Research and Development Center (FRDC) of Gansu Province in 2004, beginning excavations in the Yujingzi Basin and continuing those in the Gongpoquan Basin.

Since the initial discoveries in the Yujingzi Basin, multiple new dinosaurs have been found, including the 2006 discovery of a partially complete articulated skull and skeleton, given the field number GSJB06-17-04. This specimen, now in the Gansu Geological Museum as GSGM-F00001, was then described in 2011 by You, Li, and Liu Weichang as the holotype of the new taxon Xuwulong yueluni. The genus name is in honour of the pioneering geologist of the Gansu Province Wang Yue-lun, known by his courtesy name "Xu-wu", with the species name also in honour of Yue-lun. The Early Cretaceous deposits of the Yujingzi Basin are from Xinminpu Group, with three distinct facies, of which only the middle grey sandstone preserves Xuwulong. Carbon isotopes from the Yujingzi Basin sediments show sediments of the area are correlated to the ocean anoxic event named the Paquier Event, spanning the late Aptian to early Albian. Radiometric dating of the Xiagou Formation and Zhonggou Formation elsewhere allows the sediments of the Yujingzi Basin to be identified, with the lower gray to green-gray mudstones and siltstones being the Xiagou Formation, while the red sandstones are the base of the Zhonggou. Xuwulong can be placed in the upper Aptian in the Xiagou Formation through these correlations.
