= Kitadani Formation =

Stratigraphic unit in Japan

- Stratigraphic range: Aptian; ~121–115 Ma
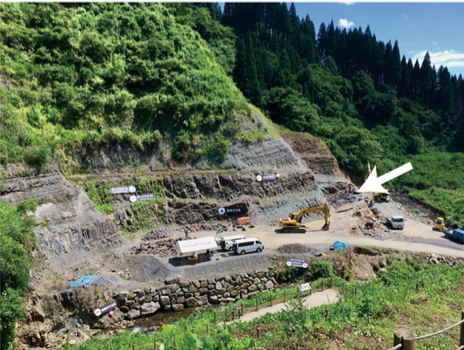
- The Kitadani Dinosaur Quarry Bonebed I, where an outcrop of the Kitadani Formation can be found; the white arrow indicates the location of the type locality of Tyrannomimus fukuiensis. Photographed in c. 2023.
- Type: Geological formation
- Unit of: Tetori Group
- Underlies: Omichidani Formation
- Overlies: Akaiwa Formation
- Thickness: ~100 m (330 ft)

Lithology
- Primary: Tuff, sandstone, shale
- Other: Coal

Location
- Coordinates: 36.1°N 136.6°E
- Approximate paleocoordinates: 47.3°N 137.7°E
- Region: Fukui Prefecture
- Country: Japan

Type section
- Named by: Unknown
- Kitadani Formation (Japan)

The Kitadani Formation (Japanese: 北谷層 Kitadani-sō) is a unit of Lower Cretaceous sedimentary rock which crops out near the city of Katsuyama in Fukui Prefecture, Japan, and it is the primary source of Cretaceous-aged non-marine vertebrate fossils in Japan. Most, if not all, of the fossil specimens collected from the Kitadani Formation are reposited at the Fukui Prefectural Dinosaur Museum.

The Kitadani Formation is a unit within the Tetori Group, a major sequence of Lower Cretaceous rocks that is distributed across Fukui, Ishikawa, and Gifu prefectures of western-central Honshu. The Tetori Group exhibits marked lateral variation, and the Kitadani Formation is only present in Fukui Prefecture. The Kitadani Formation comprises interbedded tuffs, sandstones, and shales and reaches a maximum thickness of approximately one hundred meters (~328 feet). It conformably overlies the Akaiwa Formation and is unconformably overlain by the Omichidani Formation. The Kitadani Formation is significant because it is the major source of dinosaur fossils in Japan and because of Japan's unique position along the northeastern margin of Eurasia during the Early Cretaceous.

== Geology ==
The Kitadani Formation is a unit within the Tetori Group, a Lower Cretaceous sequence of predominantly sedimentary rock which crops out in the Fukui, Ishikawa, and Gifu prefectures of west-central Honshu, Japan in the region surrounding Mount Haku.

The formations present within the Tetori Group vary laterally, and the Kitadani Formation crops out only in the Kuzuryū River district of Fukui Prefecture. In this region, the sequence comprises, in ascending stratigraphic order: Gomijima Formation, the Kuwajima Formation, the Akaiwa Formation, and Kitadani Formation. The Kitadani Formation comprises alternating horizons of red-brown tuffs, blackish shales and sandstones, and thin coal beds. The sandstones within the Kitadani Formation are light gray and green and range in clast size from fine to coarse. The type section of the Kitadani Formation occurs along the Nakanomatadani branch of the Takinami River near the city of Katsuyama, where it is approximately 100 m (~328 feet) in thickness. The Kitadani Formation conformably overlies the Akaiwa Formation and is unconformably overlain by the Omichidani Formation.

The palaeoclimate during the deposition of the formation was noticeably warmer and drier than that of the older Kuwajima and Okurodani Formations, as evidenced by oxygen isotope records as well as by the presence of crocodylomorph fossils in the former in contrast to their absence in the latter.

The Kitadani Formation has had varying nomenclature throughout the history of its study. In the early stratigraphic literature on the Tetori Group, the Kitadani Formation was variably referred to as the "Lower part of the Omichidani Formation", the "Chinaboradani Alternation of Tuff, Shale, and Sandstone", the "Kitadani Alternation of Sandstone, Shale, and Tuff", and simply the "Kitadani Alternation" prior to its designation as a formation.

== Age ==
The Kitadani Formation was biostratigraphically dated to the late Barremian and early Aptian ages of the Early Cretaceous Epoch in 2002 based upon the presence of the freshwater bivalve Nippononaia ryosekiana. In 2005, part of the Kitadani Formation was biostratigraphically dated to the Barremian Age based upon the occurrence of the charophyte gyrogonite Clavator harrisii reyi in association with other charophytes. These biostratigraphic age assignments are supported by zircon fission track radioisotopic ages of tuff, which date the Kitadani Formation to 127-115 Ma. However, the age of the overlying lower Akaiwa Formation was estimated around 121.2±1.1 Ma based on U-Pb zircon dating, so the age of the Kitadani Formation is more likely to be late Aptian.

== Fossil assemblage ==
The Kitadani Formation preserves a diverse assemblage of plant fossils; invertebrate fossils; and vertebrate body and trace fossils, including mammals, turtles, crocodylomorphs, and dinosaurs. Many vertebrate specimens from the Kitadani Formation are incomplete and poorly preserved, so taxonomic diversity is likely higher than it seems.

Color key: Taxon / Reclassified taxon / Taxon falsely reported as present / Dubious taxon or junior synonym / Ichnotaxon / Ootaxon / Morphotaxon

Notes
Uncertain or tentative taxa are in small text
~~crossed out~~ taxa are discredited.

=== Plant fossils ===
The plant fossil assemblage of the Kitadani Formation is characterized by a rarity of ferns and an abundance of cycadales and conifers represented mostly by cones and shoots. A palynological study in 2013 resulted in the identification of greater than 40 species of spores, pollen grains, and plant fragments from the Kitadani Formation representing gymnosperms, freshwater algae, and epiphyllous fungus; however, no angiosperm pollen was identified. Branches of the conifer Brachyphyllum obesum have been recovered, which was interpreted to represent the warming and possible drying of the climate toward the upper Tetori Group. This interpretation is supported by the lack of plants from lower in the Tetori Group, such as ginkgos, in the Kitadani Formation.

=== Invertebrate fossils ===
The invertebrate fossil assemblage of the Kitadani Formation mostly comprises freshwater and brackish water bivalve and gastropod mollusks.

Molluscs reported from the Kitadani Formation
Genus	Species	Location	Stratigraphic position	Material	Notes	Images
Unio	U (?). ogamigoensis				Unionid bivalve	
Plicatounio	P. naktongensis naktongensis					
Plicatounio	P. naktongensis multiplicatus					
Nagdongia	N. soni (or Nakamuranaia chingshanensis)					
Pseudohyria	P. matsumotoi					
Pseudohyria	P. sp. cf. matsumotoi					
Nippononaia	N. ryosekiana					
Nippononaia	N. tetoriensis					
Trigonioides	T. (Wakinoa) tetoriensis					
Viviparus	V. onogoensis				Architaenioglossan gastropod	
Planorbidae	Indeterminate				Hygrophilan gastropod	

Insects reported from the Kitadani Formation
Genus	Species	Location	Stratigraphic position	Material	Notes	Images
?Morphna	?M. sp.				Blaberidae	
Petropterix	P. fukuiensis				Umenocoleidae	
Praeblattella	P. inexpecta				Mesoblattinidae	
Praeblattella	P. arcuata				Mesoblattinidae	
?Vitisma	?V. sp.				Umenocoleidae	

Ostracods reported from the Kitadani Formation
Genus	Species	Location	Stratigraphic position	Material	Notes	Images
Cypridea	C. angusticaudata				Ostracod	
Cypridea	C. (Morinia) monosulcata zhejiangensis				Ostracod	
Cypridea	C. (Bisulcocypridea) sp.				Ostracod	
Timiriasevia	Indeterminate				Ostracod	

=== Vertebrate fossils ===
==== Actinopterygii ====
Fishes reported from the Kitadani Formation
Genus	Species	Location	Stratigraphic position	Material	Notes	Images
Amiiformes	indeterminate	Kitadani Dinosaur Quarry Bonebed I		Scales		
?Lepidotes	?L. sp.			Scales		

==== Mammaliaformes ====
Mammaliaformes reported from the Kitadani Formation
Genus	Species	Location	Stratigraphic position	Material	Notes	Images
Symmetrolestes	S. parvus	North of Kitadani Dinosaur Quarry Bonebed		Fragmentary right mandible	Spalacotheriid	
Eobaataridae	Indeterminate	Kitadani Dinosaur Quarry Bonebed I		A left p4 crown		
?Triconodontidae	Indeterminate	Kitadani Dinosaur Quarry Bonebed I		"a fragment of possible right dentary with a damaged molariform crown and roots"		

==== Testudines ====
Turtles are represented mostly by shell fragments within the Kitadani Formation.

Turtles reported from the Kitadani Formation
Genus	Species	Location	Stratigraphic position	Material	Notes	Images
Adocidae	Indeterminate			Shell	Different with Adocus from the same formation	
Adocus	A. sp.	Kitadani Dinosaur Quarry Bonebed I		Shell		
Nanhsiungchelyidae	Indeterminate	Kitadani Dinosaur Quarry Bonebed I		Shell	Had been tentatively classified as Basilemys sp. by Hirayama (2002)	
?Sinemydidae	Indeterminate	Kitadani Dinosaur Quarry Bonebed I		Shell		
Testudinoidea	Indeterminate	Kitadani Dinosaur Quarry Bonebed I		Shell		
Trionychidae	Indeterminate	Kitadani Dinosaur Quarry Bonebed I		Shell		
Xinjiangchelyidae	Indeterminate			Shell		

==== Crocodylomorpha ====
A nearly complete skeleton of goniopholidid has been discovered from the Kitadani Formation, but this material remains undescribed.

Crocodylomorpha reported from the Kitadani Formation
Genus	Species	Location	Stratigraphic position	Material	Notes	Images
Goniopholididae	indeterminate	Kitadani Dinosaur Quarry (Unspecified)		Partial skeleton including cranial remains	Phylogenetic analysis suggests that it was a basal member of the group similar in position to Siamosuchus and Sunosuchus.	Undescribed Kitadani goniopholidid

==== Dinosauria ====
Dinosaurs are among the most well-known vertebrate taxa from the Kitadani Formation. Taxa from all three major dinosaurian clades — Theropoda, Sauropodomorpha, and Ornithischia — have been recovered.

Dinosaurs reported from the Kitadani Formation
Genus	Species	Location	Stratigraphic position	Material	Notes	Images
Ankylosauria	Indeterminate			Teeth	Family unknown	
Fukuipteryx	F. prima	Kitadani Dinosaur Quarry (Unspecified)		Associated disarticulated partial skeleton	Avialan	
Fukuiraptor	F. kitadaniensis	Kitadani Dinosaur Quarry Bonebed I		Multiple individuals showing different ontogenetic stages	Basal megaraptoran	
Fukuisaurus	F. tetoriensis	Kitadani Dinosaur Quarry Bonebed I		Multiple specimens representing a partial skeleton	Hadrosauroid	
Fukuititan	F. nipponensis	Kitadani Dinosaur Quarry Bonebed II		Associated partial skeleton	Titanosauriform	
Fukuivenator	F. paradoxus	Kitadani Dinosaur Quarry		Partial skeleton with skull	Basal therizinosaur or some other kind of basal maniraptoran	
Koshisaurus	K. katsuyama	Kitadani Dinosaur Quarry Bonebed IV		Partial skeleton	Hadrosauroid	
Spinosauridae	Indeterminate	Kitadani Dinosaur Quarry Bonebed I		18 Teeth	Subfamily unknown	
Tyrannomimus	T. fukuiensis	Kitadani Dinosaur Quarry Bonebed I		Isolated remains from multiple individuals	The earliest definitive deinocheirid	

==== Ichnofossils ====
Undescribed tracks of ankylosaurs and sauropods have been discovered from the Kitadani Formation.

Ichnofossils reported from the Kitadani Formation
Genus	Species	Location	Stratigraphic position	Material	Notes	Images
Amblydactylus	A. isp.				Ornithopod tracks.	
Aquatilavipes	A. isp.				Bird tracks	
Asianopodus	A. isp.				Small to medium-sized tridactyl theropod tracks.	
Caririchnium	C. isp.				Ornithopod tracks	
Eubrontidae	Indeterminate				Large tridactyl theropod tracks.	
Grallatoridae	Indeterminate				Small to medium-sized tridactyl theropod tracks	
cf. Gyeongsangornipes	cf. G. isp.				Bird tracks.	
Minisauripus	M. isp.				The smallest theropod track from the Kitadani Formation.	
Ornithomimipodidae	Indeterminate				Slender-toed tridactyl theropod tracks.	
Pteraichnus	P. nipponensis				Pterosaur tracks; The first pterosaur ichnofossil reported in Japan.	
Velociraptorichnus	V. isp.				Didactyl theropod tracks, troodontid as a potential trackmaker suggested.	

==== Eggs ====
Eggs reported from the Kitadani Formation
Genus	Species	Location	Stratigraphic position	Material	Notes	Images
Plagioolithus	P. fukuiensis				Three-layered eggshell interpreted as a fossil avian egg.	

== See also ==
- List of dinosaur-bearing rock formations
