= Tedorosaurus =

Tedorosaurus Temporal range: Callovian

Scientific classification
- Domain: Eukaryota
- Kingdom: Animalia
- Phylum: Chordata
- Class: Reptilia
- Order: Squamata (?)
- Genus: †Tedorosaurus; Shikama, 1969
- Species: †T. asuwaensis

Binomial name
- †Tedorosaurus asuwaensis Shikama, 1969

Extinct genus of reptiles

Tedorosaurus is a genus of extinct lizard-like reptile known from Callovian (Middle Jurassic) section of the Fukui Prefecture, Japan. This genus is represented by single species Tedorosaurus asuwaensis. It is the first Mesozoic terrestrial reptile fossil from Japan.

== Description ==
T. asuwaensis is described by Shikama Tokio in 1969, from Sakaidera Formation in the Tetori Group. Fossil is first discovered by a junior high school student, and the type specimen is privately owned by a teacher who is also a fossil collector. With total length is bit over 10 centimetres (0.33 ft), it had relatively long hindlegs. Due to the specimen is in the private collection, its identification is uncertain.
