= Chiayusuchus =

Chiayusuchus Temporal range: 130–112 Ma Barremian - Aptian

Scientific classification
- Kingdom: Animalia
- Phylum: Chordata
- Class: Reptilia
- Clade: Archosauria
- Clade: Pseudosuchia
- Clade: Crocodylomorpha
- Order: Crocodilia
- Genus: †Chiayusuchus; Bohlin, 1953

Type species
- * C. cingulatus Bohlin, 1953

Extinct genus of reptiles

Chiayusuchus is an extinct genus of stomatosuchid crocodylomorph. Fossils have been found from the Xinminbao Group in Gansu, China. It existed during the Barremian and Aptian stages of the Early Cretaceous. Although it was once considered as member of Stomatosuchidae, it is denied by having different teeth shape.
