= Amagodani Formation =

Geologic formation in Japan

- Stratigraphic range: Valanginian
- Type: Geological formation
- Unit of: Tetori Group
- Underlies: Okura Formation
- Overlies: Okurodani Formation

Lithology
- Primary: Sandstone
- Other: Mudstone

Location
- Coordinates: 36.0°N 136.9°E
- Approximate paleocoordinates: 44.0°N 138.8°E
- Region: Gifu Prefecture
- Country: Japan
- Amagodani Formation (Japan)

The Amagodani Formation is an Early Cretaceous geologic formation in Japan. An indeterminate iguanodontian tooth has been recovered from the formation. as well as indeterminate pterosaur remains. Dinosaur footprints are also known from the formation.

== See also ==
- List of dinosaur-bearing rock formations
  - List of stratigraphic units with indeterminate dinosaur fossils
