= Akaiwa Formation =

Early Cretaceous geologic formation in Japan

- Stratigraphic range: Aptian; ~121 Ma
- Type: Geological formation
- Unit of: Tetori Group
- Underlies: Kitadani Formation
- Overlies: Kuwajima Formation

Lithology
- Primary: Sandstone, conglomerate

Location
- Coordinates: 36.2°N 136.7°E
- Approximate paleocoordinates: 46.1°N 138.3°E
- Region: Honshu
- Country: Japan
- Akaiwa Formation (Japan)

The Akaiwa Formation (Japanese: 赤岩層, romanized: Akaiwa-sō) is an Early Cretaceous (Aptian) geologic formation in central Honshu, Japan. Fossils of the turtle Kappachelys and indeterminate ornithischians are known from the formation, as well as fossil ornithopod tracks.

== Fossil content ==
The following fossils have been reported from the formation:

- Osteichthyes indet. - 'fish scales'

Reptiles

- Turtles
  - Kappachelys okurai
- Crocodylomorpha indet. - isolated teeth of small crocodiles
- ?Euornithopoda indet.
- Neochoristodera indet. - a nearly complete right premaxilla
- Ornithopoda indet. - isolated teeth of small ornithopods
- ?Theropoda indet.

Ichnofossils

- Ornithischia indet. - tracks

== See also ==
- List of dinosaur-bearing rock formations
- List of stratigraphic units with indeterminate dinosaur fossils
  - List of stratigraphic units with ornithischian tracks
    - Ornithopod tracks
