= Sebayashi Formation =

Cretaceous geologic formation in Japan

- Stratigraphic range: Barremian-Albian; ~125–100.5 Ma
- Type: Geological formation
- Unit of: Sanchu Group

Lithology
- Primary: Sandstone, shale
- Other: Conglomerate

Location
- Coordinates: 36.1°N 138.8°E
- Approximate paleocoordinates: 48.4°N 140.0°E
- Region: Gunma, Honshu
- Country: Japan
- Sebayashi Formation (Japan)

The Sebayashi Formation is a Barremian to Albian geologic formation in Japan. Dinosaur remains are among the fossils that have been recovered from the formation, although only two species, Fukuiraptor and Siamosaurus, have been referred to a specific genus.

== Paleofauna ==
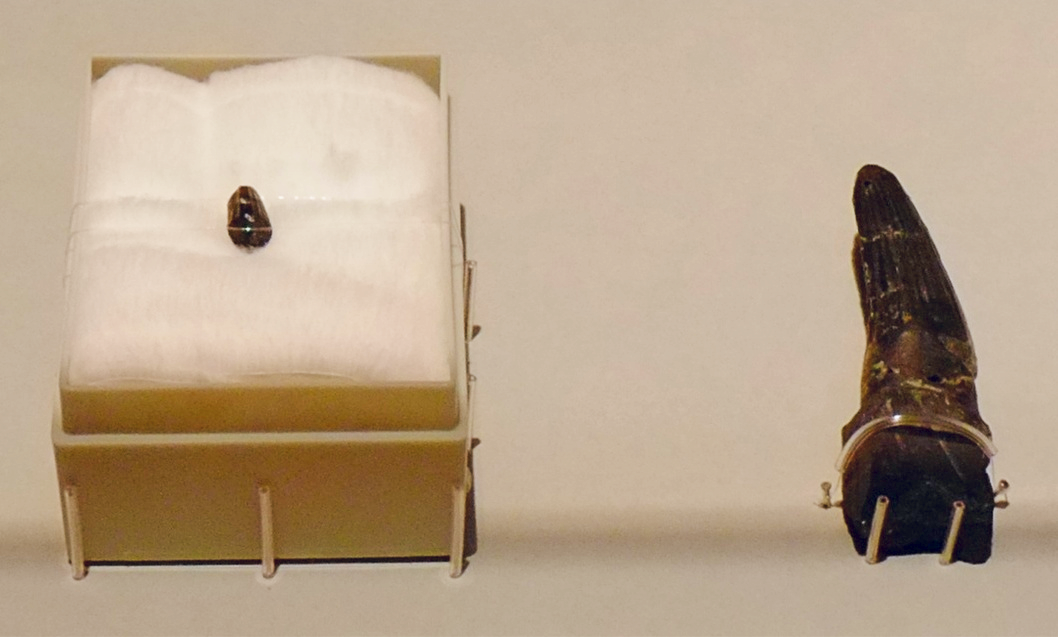
Partial tooth of an indeterminate spinosaurid (KDC-PV-0003) and possible Siamosaurus tooth (GMNH-PV-999) from the Sebayashi Formation in the National Museum of Nature and Science, Tokyo

- Bivalvia indet.
- Dinosauria indet. - "Footprints"
- Ornithopoda indet. - "Footprints"
- Siamosaurus? - "Tooth (GMNH-PV-999)"
- Spinosauridae indet. "Tooth (KDC-PV-0003)"
- aff. Fukuiraptor kitadaniensis - "Tooth"
- Theropoda indet. - "Footprints"

== See also ==
- List of dinosaur-bearing rock formations
  - List of stratigraphic units with indeterminate dinosaur fossils
