= Yoichi Azuma =

Japanese paleontologist (born1949)

- 東 洋一
- Born: 1949 (age 76–77); Kure, Hiroshima Prefecture, Japan
- Education: Fukui University
- Awards: Fukui Prefecture Science and Academic Award (2020)
- Scientific career
- Fields: Geology, Paleontology
- Institutions: Fukui Prefectural Dinosaur Museum; Fukui Prefectural University

Yoichi Azuma (東 洋一; born 1949) is a Japanese paleontologist, geologist, and museum curator. He is widely regarded as one of the pioneers of dinosaur research in Japan and played a central role in establishing Fukui Prefecture as the country's most important dinosaur fossil region.

He has served as Director and later Special Director of the Fukui Prefectural Dinosaur Museum, Professor Emeritus at Fukui Prefectural University, Visiting Professor at The Open University of Japan, and President of the Asia Dinosaur Association.

== Early life and education ==
Azuma was born in Kure, Hiroshima Prefecture, where he spent his childhood. His interest in fossils began in elementary school when he discovered whale fossils during a collecting trip to Shōbara City, Hiroshima. Fascinated by the mystery of marine fossils found in mountainous regions, he devoted himself to fossil collecting throughout his youth.

He graduated from the Faculty of Education at Fukui University, specializing in geology, and later worked as a technical staff member and elementary school teacher before joining the Fukui Prefectural Board of Education in 1981.

== Career ==
In 1982, Azuma participated in a geological survey in Katsuyama, Fukui Prefecture, which led to the discovery of Mesozoic crocodilian fossils. Subsequent excavations revealed Japan's first nearly complete Mesozoic crocodile skeleton.

During the 1980s, dinosaur fossils were increasingly discovered across Japan. In 1988, Azuma conducted a preliminary excavation in Katsuyama that confirmed the presence of dinosaur fossils in Fukui Prefecture for the first time. This discovery led to Japan's first full-scale, government-funded dinosaur excavation project beginning in 1989.

Over five years, excavations yielded more than 300 fossils representing eight dinosaur species, including the herbivorous dinosaur later described as Fukuisaurus tetoriensis. Katsuyama subsequently became Japan's most prolific dinosaur fossil site.

== International collaboration ==
Due to the limited availability of comparative materials in Japan at the time, Azuma actively sought international collaboration. He established a long-term research relationship with Chinese paleontologist Dong Zhiming of the Institute of Vertebrate Paleontology and Paleoanthropology in Beijing and visited China more than 100 times over the course of his career.

He also collaborated extensively with researchers in Canada, the United States, and Europe. With Canadian paleontologist Philip J. Currie, he co-described the theropod dinosaur Fukuiraptor kitadaniensis.

== Fukui Prefectural Dinosaur Museum ==
Azuma played a leading role in planning and establishing the Fukui Prefectural Dinosaur Museum, which opened in 2000. He oversaw the acquisition of dinosaur skeleton replicas from museums worldwide and contributed to the museum's international reputation.

He became Director of the museum in 2009 and Special Director in 2010. The museum's success also led to the establishment of the Dinosaur Research Institute at Fukui Prefectural University in 2013 and a graduate-level paleontology program in 2018.

Azuma retired from his administrative posts in March 2020 and was named Professor Emeritus of Fukui Prefectural University and Honorary Advisor to the Fukui Prefectural Dinosaur Museum.

In November 2023, he was elected President of the Asian Dinosaur Association.

== Selected publications ==
=== Doctoral dissertation ===
- Azuma, Yoichi (1993). The Early Cretaceous dinosaur ichnofauna and its paleoenvironmental development in the Tetori Group, Japan. University of Tokyo. doi:10.11501/3095965.

=== Selected articles ===
- Shibata, Masateru; You, Hailu; Azuma, Yoichi (2017). "Progress of dinosaur research in Japan: comparison of Early Cretaceous dinosaur faunas in East and Southeast Asia". Kaseki. 101: 23–41. doi:10.14825/kaseki.101.0_23.
