= Okurodani Formation =

Geologic formation in Japan

- Stratigraphic range: Hauterivian–Aptian
- Type: Geological formation
- Unit of: Tetori Group
- Underlies: Amagodani Formation
- Overlies: Otaniyama Formation

Lithology
- Primary: Mudstone, Siltstone, Sandstone
- Other: Tuffite

Location
- Region: Gifu Prefecture
- Country: Japan

The Okurodani Formation is an Early Cretaceous geologic formation in central Honshu, Japan. Part of the Tetori Group, it primarily consists of freshwater continental sediments deposited in a floodplain environment, with occasional volcanic tuffite horizons. It has an uncertain age, probably dating between the Hauterivian and Aptian. An indeterminate iguanodontian dinosaur tooth has been recovered from the formation. Many other fossil vertebrates are known from the KO2 locality

== Fossil records ==
=== Molluscs ===
Molluscs reported from the Okurodani Formation
Genus	Species	Location	Stratigraphic position	Material	Notes	Images
Margaritifera	M. ogamigoensis					
Nagdongia	N. soni					
?Batissa	?B. antiqua					
Nippononaia	N. tetoriensis					
Myrene	M. tetoriensis					
Tetoria	T. yokoyamai					
Sphaerium	S. coreanicum					
Viviparus	V. ongoensis					

=== Amphibians ===
Amphibians reported from the Okurodani Formation
Genus	Species	Location	Stratigraphic position	Material	Notes	Images
Anura	Indeterminate	KO2			Discoglossid grade	
Caudata	Indeterminate	KO2				

=== Squamates ===
Squamates reported from the Okurodani Formation
Genus	Species	Location	Stratigraphic position	Material	Notes	Images
Sakurasaurus	S. shokawensis	KO2				
?Anguimorpha	Indeterminate	KO2				
Scincomorpha	Indeterminate	KO2			new taxon	
Squamata	Indeterminate	KO2			2 distinct taxa	

=== Turtles ===
Turtles reported from the Okurodani Formation
Genus	Species	Location	Stratigraphic position	Material	Notes	Images
cf. Sinemys	Indeterminate	KO2				
Sinochelys	Indeterminate	KO2			Sinochelyidae	
Adocidae	Indeterminate	KO2				
Trionychidae	Indeterminate	KO2				

=== Choristoderes ===
Choristoderes reported from the Okurodani Formation
Genus	Species	Location	Stratigraphic position	Material	Notes	Images
Monjurosuchus	Indeterminate	KO2		"Association of right squamosal, jugal, quadratojugal, and quadrate"		Monjurosuchus Shokawa ikoi
Shokawa	S. ikoi	KO2		Partial skeleton		Monjurosuchus Shokawa ikoi

== See also ==
- List of dinosaur-bearing rock formations
  - List of stratigraphic units with indeterminate dinosaur fossils
