= Asia Dinosaur Association =

- Abbreviation: ADA
- Formation: July 12, 2013; 13 years ago
- Type: non-profit
- Purpose: scientific
- Fields: Paleontology; Evolution; Stratigraphy
- Honorary President: Rinchen Barsbold
- President: Dong Zhiming
- Website: www.dinosaur.pref.fukui.jp/ADA/index.html

The Asia Dinosaur Association (ADA) is a professional organization that established in 2013 to advance research, education, and culture related to Asian dinosaurs. The secretary office is settled in Fukui Prefectural Dinosaur Museum.

== Mission and activities ==
Since the 1980s, dinosaur research especially in East Asia has attracted worldwide attention. However there were no professional place to present and exchange their information such as an excavation results and plans of collaborated exhibition. ADA has been established in July 2013 with a mission to "promote research of paleontology and geology related to Asian dinosaurs; advance dinosaur research and educate general public; support and encourage students and young researchers; develop the culture of dinosaurs". ADA Board consists of members from China, Japan, Malaysia, Mongolia, Russia, South Korea, and Thailand. ADA holds a scientific meeting in every two years.

=== Scientific meetings ===
ADA holds biennial symposium "International Symposium on Asian Dinosaurs (ISAD)".

- 2014 March - Fukui, Japan (Fukui Prefectural University, Fukui Prefectural Dinosaur Museum)
- 2015 November - Bangkok, Thailand (Department of Mineral Resources, Khorat Fossil Museum, Mahasarakham University)
- 2017 May - Hunan, China (The Ministry of Land and Resources, P. R. China)
- 2019 July - Ulaanbaatar, Mongolia (Institute of Paleontology and Geology, Mongolian Academy of Sciences)
- 2025 September - Fukui, Japan (Fukui Prefectural University, Fukui Prefectural Dinosaur Museum)

Financial supports for students and young researchers who intend to present their research in ISAD are provided to encourage young generation to lead future studies of Asian dinosaurs.

A temporary exhibition "The Amazing Asian Dinosaurs @Siam" was held at Siam Paragon in conjunction with ISAD at Bangkok, Thailand in 2015.
