= Fukui Prefectural Dinosaur Museum =

Fukui Prefectural Dinosaur Museum (FPDM) 福井県立恐竜博物館
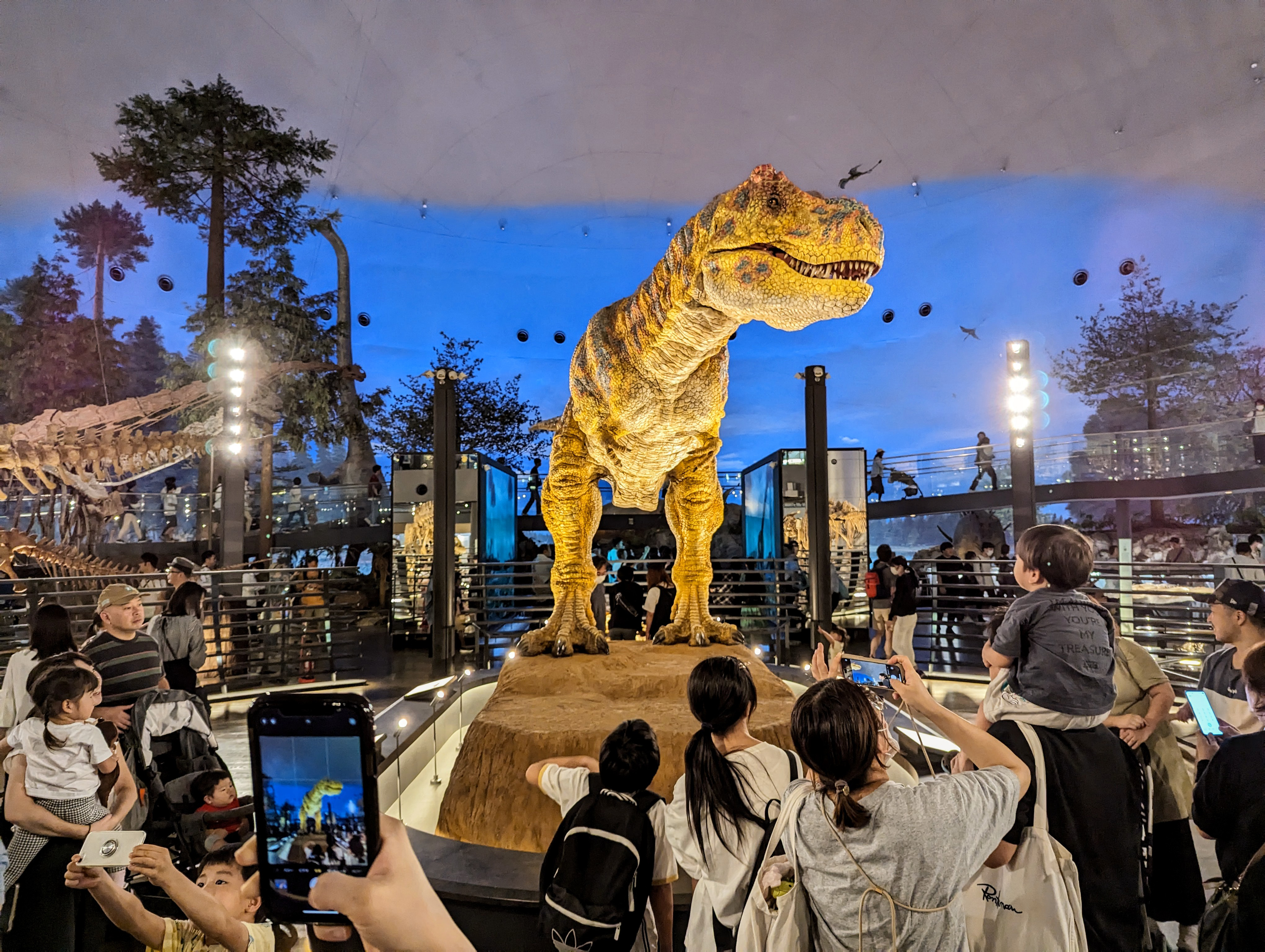

- Location within Fukui Prefecture Location within Japan
- Established: July 14, 2000
- Location: 51-11 Terao, Muroko-chō, Katsuyama, Fukui Prefecture, Japan
- Coordinates: 36°04′58″N 136°30′24″E
- Type: Natural history museum
- Visitors: 901,119 (FY2016)
- Director: Toshihisa Takeuchi
- Curator: 15
- Architect: Kisho Kurokawa
- Public transit access: Katsuyama Eiheiji Line (Echizen Railway)
- Website: Official website

The Fukui Prefectural Dinosaur Museum (福井県立恐竜博物館, Fukui Ken-ritsu Kyōryū Hakubutsukan), located in Katsuyama, Fukui, Japan, is one of the leading dinosaur museums in Asia that is renowned for its exhibits of fossil specimens of dinosaurs and paleontological research. It is sited in the Nagaoyama Park (Katsuyama Dinosaur Forest Park) near the Kitadani Dinosaur Quarry that the Lower Cretaceous Kitadani Formation of the Tetori Group is cropped out and a large number of dinosaur remains including Fukuiraptor kitadaniensis and Fukuisaurus tetoriensis are found and excavated.

Since October 2009, the entire area of Katsuyama City has been recognized as a Japanese Geopark "Dinosaur Valley Fukui Katsuyama Geopark". Since July 2014, the guide tour to the field station next to the excavation site has been available from the end of April to early November. Dozens of fossil specimens of five named dinosaurs and their excavation site have been designated as a Natural Monument of Japan since February 2017. The Asia Dinosaur Association Secretary Office has been housed inside the museum since its establishment in 2013.

== History ==
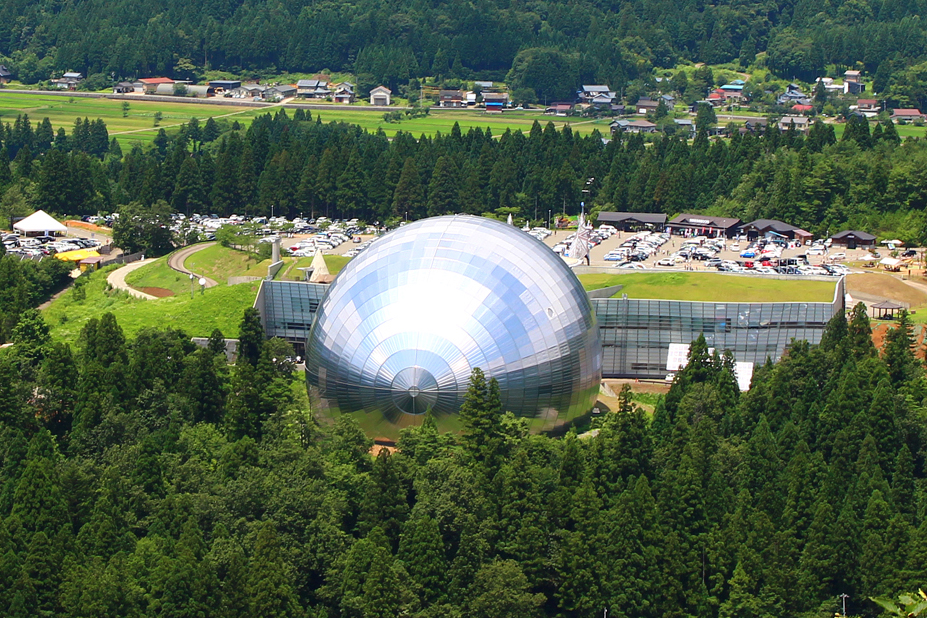
Exterior view

FPDM was established as a paleontological and geological museum in the Nagaoyama Park where it is close to the dinosaur excavation site (the museum is about 5.5 km southwest from the site) in 2000. The nature section of Fukui Prefectural Museum has transferred to FPDM at the same time. The name was changed from "Fukui Prefectural Museum" to "Fukui Prefectural Museum of Cultural History" in 2003.

- 1982: A nearly complete skeleton of Crocodilia was found at the Sugiyama branch of Takinami river in Katsuyama City of Fukui Prefecture.
- 1984 April: "Fukui Prefectural Museum" was opened at Fukui City of Fukui Prefecture (changed to Fukui Prefectural Museum of Cultural History since 2003).
- 1988: Two carnivorous dinosaur teeth were discovered at the same site with a Crocodilian skeleton in the museum's preliminary survey.
- 1989: The First Dinosaur Excavation Project was executed for 5 years (1989-1993).
- 1995: The Second Dinosaur Excavation Project was executed for 5 years (1995-1999).
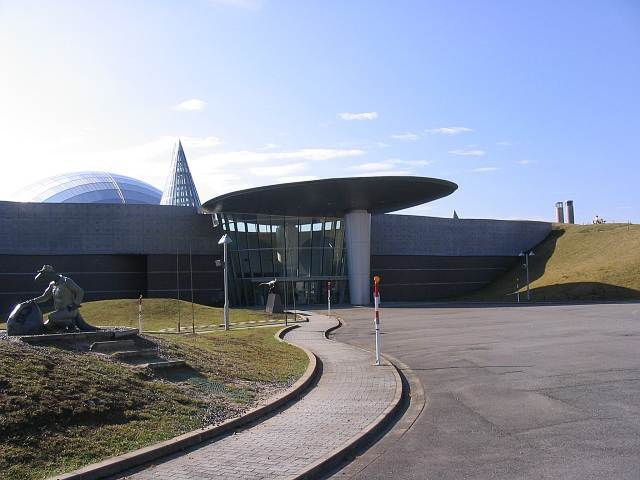
- Museum Exterior
  1998 July: Start construction of the museum building.
- 2000 June: Completion of the museum.
- 2000 June: Fukuiraptor kitadaniensis was named.
- 2000 July 14: Fukui Prefectural Dinosaur Museum was opened.
- 2003: Fukuisaurus tetoriensis was named.
- 2007: The Third Dinosaur Excavation Project was executed for 4 years (2007-2010).
- 2010: Fukuititan nipponensis was named.
- 2013 July: The Asia Dinosaur Association was established and its secretary office is settled in FPDM.
- 2014 July: The Field Station was opened near the Dinosaur Quarry.
- 2015: Koshisaurus katsuyama was named.
- 2016: Fukuivenator paradoxus was named.
- 2017 February 9: Dinosaur fossils of 5 species and the outcrop of the excavation site were nationally designated as a natural monument.
- 2019: Fukuipteryx prima was named.
- 2023: Tyrannomimus fukuiensis was named.

== Exhibits ==
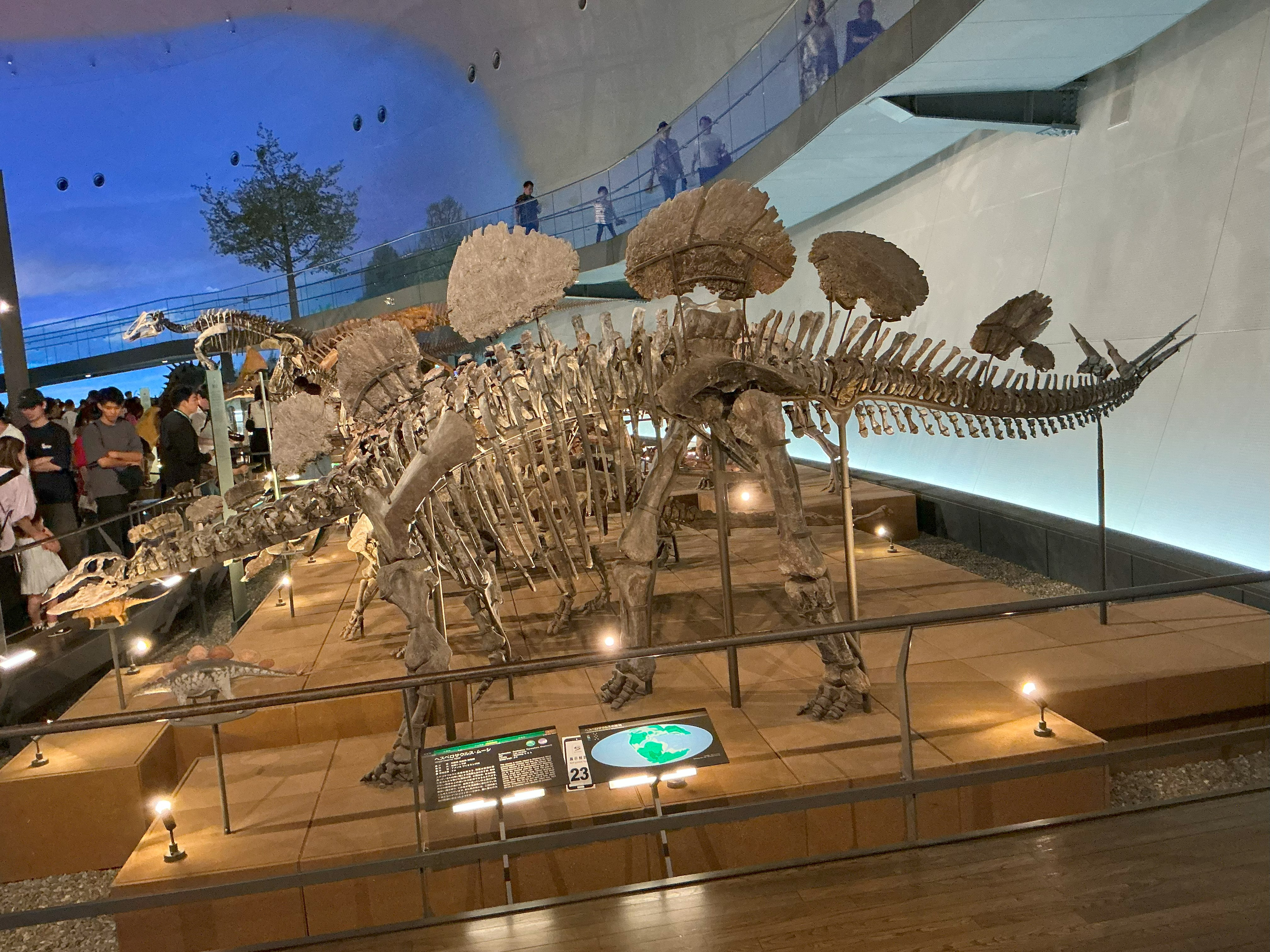
Hesperosaurus skeleton

The exhibition is roughly divide into 5 zones; "Dino Street", "World of Dinosaurs", "Science of the Earth", "History of Life", and "Dino Lab". The museum entrance is located at the third floor of the building. After ticketing, visitors go down an approx. 33 meters long escalator to the basement floor. The basement consists of "Dino Street" and a diorama of the excavation site. "Dino Street" is a passage displaying various real fossils from all over the world on the right and left walls. There is a replica reproducing the discovery of a nearly complete Camarasaurus skeleton found in Wyoming, USA at the end of the passage. Incidentally, the original fossil bones of this Camarasaurus are displayed on the first floor of the museum.

More than 40 skeletons of dinosaurs, including 10 original fossils, are displayed in "World of Dinosaurs". There is a nearly 200 m^{2} diorama reconstructing the Jurassic period in Zigong, China. This diorama includes some robotic dinosaurs that move and make sounds.

"Science of the Earth" (1F) focuses on earth science, including plate tectonics, rock formation, precious gems and more.

There is a hands-on exhibition room for children called "Dino Lab"(1-2F). Visitors can enjoy several quizzes with dinosaur fossils and touch some specimens including a real Tyrannosaurus limb bone.

Visitors can view the inside of the fossil preparation laboratory through a large window.

On the second floor, "History of Life" displays various specimens along with the timeline from the birth of life to the present. Exhibits on this floor show how ancient single-celled organisms evolved into dinosaurs and mammals such as human beings.

Images of the exhibition hall are visible on Google Street View.

Some exhibits are on the outside of the museum building, such as many kinds of rock specimens, a Triassic-era tree trunk, and a replica Tyrannosaurus skeleton (Wankel) laying in rocks.

From the spring to the fall, visitors can experience excavation activities at the park and the field station.

== Construction ==
The location for the museum was chosen because many fossils have been found in Katsuyama and it uses many fossils found in the surrounding area. The museum was designed by Kisho Kurokawa and completed in the summer of 2000 as the centerpiece of the Dino Expo Fukui 2000 that was hosted in Nagaoyama Park.

It officially opened on July 14, 2000 with an area of approximately 30,000 m^{2} (320,000 ft^{2}). The total floor space is approx. 15,000m^{2} making it one of the largest paleontological museums in Japan. The exhibition hall was constructed as a dome with no pillar allowing for wide open spaces to display the large dinosaurs.

The total construction cost is approximately 14 billion JPY (9.15 billion for building, 3.1 billion for exhibits).

== Sister museums ==
The Fukui Prefectural Dinosaur Museum signed a sister museum agreement with the following museums:

- (Canada) Royal Tyrrell Museum of Palaeontology (on November 23, 2000)
- (China) Institute of Vertebrate Paleontology and Paleoanthropology, Chinese Academy of Sciences (on March 6, 2001)
- (China) Zhejiang Museum of Natural History (on March 12, 2004)
- (China) Zigong Dinosaur Museum (on March 22, 2008)
- (United States) Carnegie Museum of Natural History (on March 17, 2010)
- (China) Institute of Geology, Chinese Academy of Geological Sciences (on July 8, 2010)
- (China) Henan Geological Museum (on September 28, 2010)
- (United States) Museum of the Rockies, Montana State University (on July 7, 2011)
- (Thailand) Sirindhorn Museum (on November 25, 2014)

== See also ==
- Prefectural museum
- Fukuipteryx
- Fukuiraptor
- Fukuisaurus
- Fukuititan
- Fukuivenator
- Koshisaurus
- Tyrannomimus
