= Tetori Group =

- Stratigraphic range: Early Cretaceous
- Type: Stratigraphic group
- Sub-units: Fukui Area: Kitadani Formation; Akaiwa Formation; Kuwajima Formation; Gomijima Formation; Shokawa Area: Bessandani Formation; Okura Formation; Amagodani Formation; Okurodani Formation; Otaniyama Formation; Mitarai Formation; Ushimaru Formation
- Underlies: Omichidani Formation
- Overlies: Hida Gneiss, Kiritani Formation or Kuzuryu Group
- Thickness: Over 1,000 metres (3,280 ft)

Lithology
- Primary: Sandstone, Mudstone
- Other: Tuffite

Location
- Country: Japan

Type section
- Named by: Oishi
- Location: Areas along the Itoshirogawa River
- Year defined: 1933

The Tetori Group is a stratigraphic group in Japan, found within several basins in and around Fukui Prefecture. It is Early Cretaceous in age. It primarily consists of freshwater continental deposits, with some beds of volcanic tuffite. It primarily overlies Jurassic marine sediments or gneiss basement. Some of the units within the group are noted for their fossil content, including dinosaurs, lizards mammals and other vertebrates.

== Stratigraphy ==
The term "Tetori Group" was first used by Oishi in 1933. A significant revision was made by Maeda in 1961 which subdivided the Group into three subgroups, which in ascending order are the Kuzuryu Subgroup, the Itoshiro Subgroup and the Akaiwa Subgroup, alongside the Omichidani and Asuwa Formations, which were subsequently excluded from the group. Recent stratigraphic revisions have split off the Kuzuryu Subgroup into the Kuzuryu Group, which is Mid to Late Jurassic in age and is largely marine. There is significant lateral variation within the Tetori Group, with completely different sequences of formations in different areas, so it is difficult to correlate different sequences into the different subgroups, so the Itoshiro and Akaiwa subgroups are now considered depreciated.
