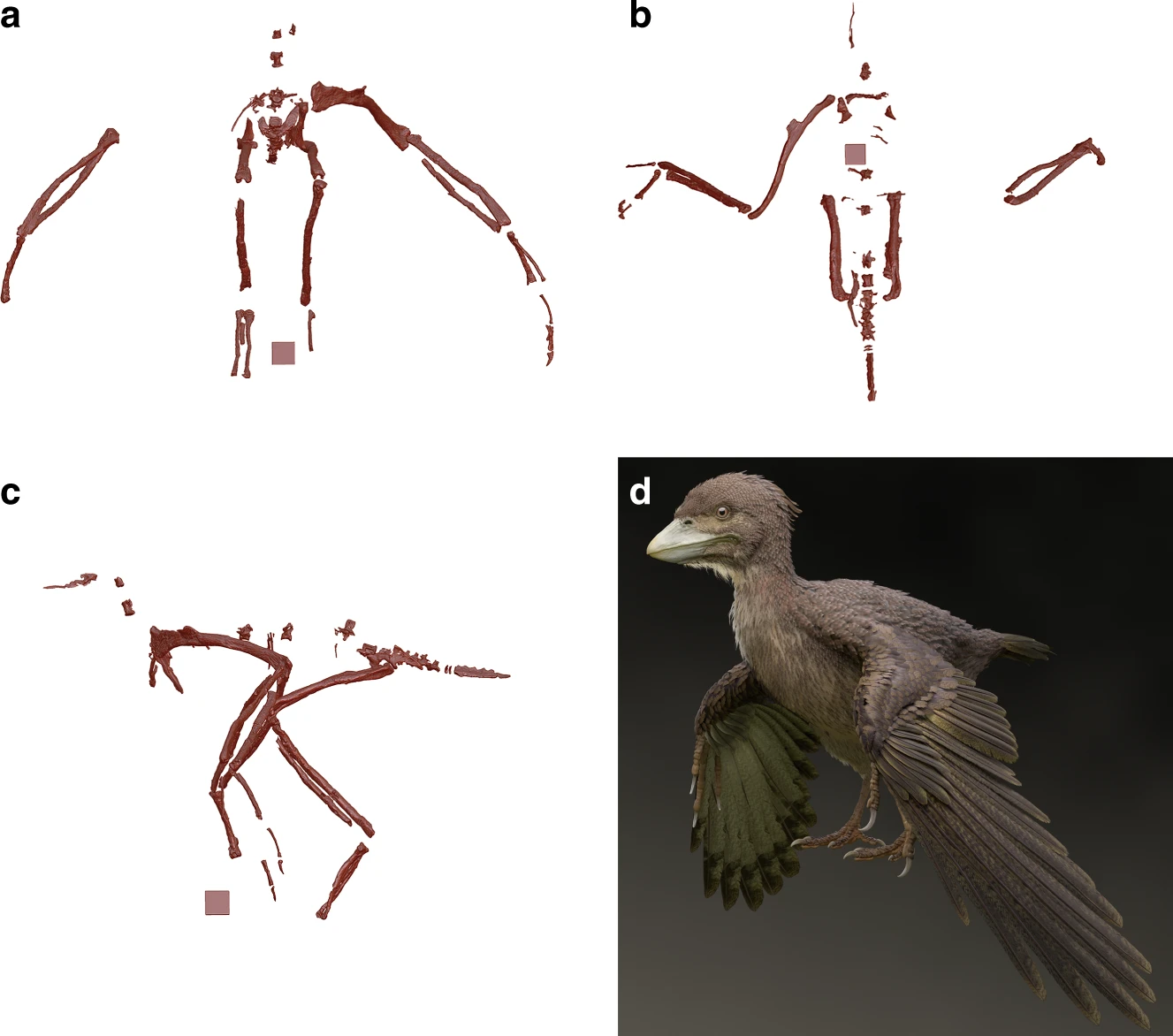
- Reconstructions and restoration. a–c Skeletal reconstructions of FPDM-V-9769 in cranial (a), dorsal (b), and left-lateral (c) views. d Life restoration of Fukuipteryx prima

Scientific classification
- Kingdom: Animalia
- Phylum: Chordata
- Class: Reptilia
- Clade: Dinosauria
- Clade: Saurischia
- Clade: Theropoda
- Clade: Avialae
- Genus: †Fukuipteryx; Imai et al., 2019
- Species: †F. prima

Binomial name
- †Fukuipteryx prima Imai et al., 2019

= Fukuipteryx =

Fukuipteryx Temporal range: Early Cretaceous, 120 Ma

Extinct genus of dinosaurs

Fukuipteryx is an extinct genus of basal avialan dinosaurs found in Early Cretaceous deposits from Japan's Kitadani Formation. It contains one species, Fukuipteryx prima.

== Discovery and naming ==
In 2013, the first associated skeleton of an Early Cretaceous avialan from Japan was collected at the Kitadani Dinosaur Quarry in Katsuyama, Fukui, central Japan. The specimen is three-dimensionally preserved, and exhibits several autapomorphies, which led to the creation of a new taxon.

In 2019, the type species Fukuipteryx prima was named and described by Takuya Imai, Yoichi Azuma, Soichiro Kawabe, Masateru Shibata, Kazunori Miyata, Wang Min and Zhou Zhonghe. The genus name combines a reference to Fukui with the Ancient Greek pteryx, meaning "feather". The specific name means "the first" in Latin and refers to its basal position on the avialan phylogenetic tree.

The holotype, FPDM-V-9769, was found in a layer of green sandstone from the Kitadani Formation that dates from the Aptian, about 120 million years old. It consists of a partial skeleton with a lower jaw. In total, a right surangular, two cervical vertebrae, four back vertebrae, two sacral vertebrae, five tail vertebrae, the pygostyle, ribs, a wishbone, both coracoid pelvis bones, the right ilium bone, the left upper arm bone, the ulna and radius of both forearms, the second right metacarpal, the left hand and both lower hindlimbs minus the calf bones and toes are preserved. The skeleton is not articulated but is preserved three-dimensionally. It is a subadult animal, less than one year old. It is part of the collection of the Fukui Prefectural Dinosaur Museum. The fossil was not fully prepared from its matrix and the bones were reconstructed via a CAT-scan.

== Description ==
Fukuipteryx was about the size of a modern pigeon.

Fukuipteryx shows several autapomorphies (unique derived characters) that indicate that it was not a very basal species, in the sense that it would be outside of Avialae. A pygostyle, a fusion of the posterior tail vertebrae, is present, suggesting that the loss of a long tail was a less important step in the evolution of flight than was previously thought. The pygostyle is robust with rudiments of neural spines still visible, while the rear end has a paddle-shaped structure. The furcula is robust and U-shaped, but the angle between the branches is not very large. The coracoid is a long strut, not fused to the shoulder blade. The humerus is the largest bone of the limbs. The humerus has a round depression on the front top of its head. The shaft of the humerus is bent upwards (with the wing in a horizontal position). The ulna and radius are longer than the femur.

== Phylogeny ==
A cladistic analysis recovered Fukuipteryx as an early-diverging avialan closer to modern birds than to Archaeopteryx, but more basal than Jeholornis. Below is a cladogram following that analysis:

- - Dromaeosauridae
  - Avialae
    - Archaeopteryx
    - - Fukuipteryx
      - - Jeholornis
        - - Confuciusornithidae
          - - Jinguofortisidae
            - - Sapeornis
              - Ornithothoraces
