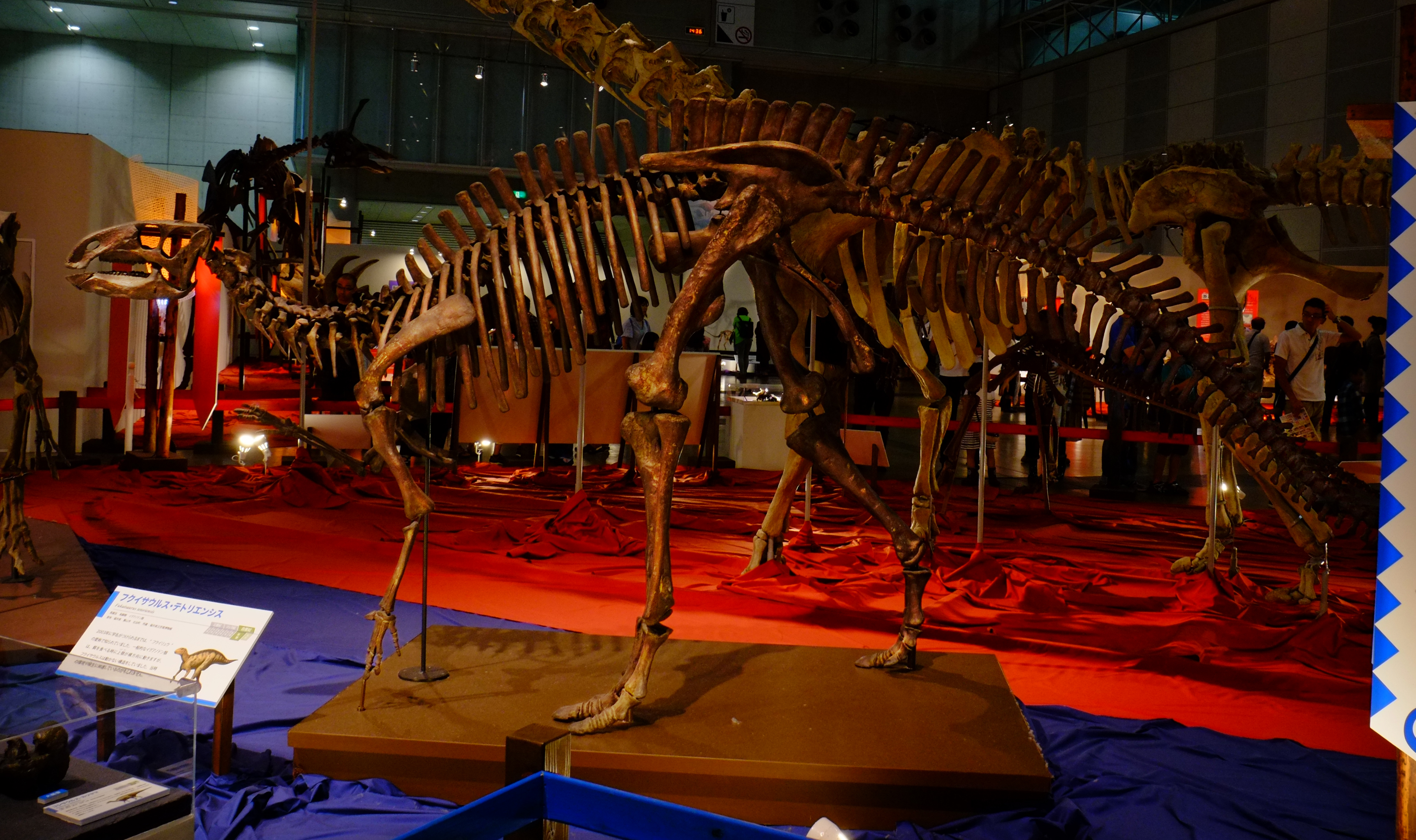
- Reconstructed skeleton

Scientific classification
- Kingdom: Animalia
- Phylum: Chordata
- Class: Reptilia
- Clade: Dinosauria
- Clade: †Ornithischia
- Clade: †Ornithopoda
- Clade: †Ankylopollexia
- Clade: †Styracosterna
- Genus: †Fukuisaurus; Kobayashi & Azuma, 2003
- Species: †F. tetoriensis

Binomial name
- †Fukuisaurus tetoriensis Kobayashi & Azuma, 2003

= Fukuisaurus =

Fukuisaurus Temporal range: Early Cretaceous, Barremian

Extinct genus of dinosaurs

Fukuisaurus (meaning "Fukui (Fortunate) lizard") is a genus of herbivorous ornithopod dinosaur that lived during the Early Cretaceous in what is now Japan. The type species is F. tetoriensis, which was named and described in 2003.

== Discovery and naming ==
Remains of Fukuisaurus were discovered in 1989, in Katsuyama, Fukui Prefecture, in rocks from the Kitadani Formation, dating to the Barremian. The type species, Fukuisaurus tetoriensis, was described in 2003 by Yoshitsugu Kobayashi and Yoichi Azuma. The genus name refers to Fukui; the specific name to the geological Tetori Group. The type specimens or cotypes are FPDM-V-40-1, a right maxilla, and FPDM-V-40-2, a right jugal. Further elements of a skull and a right sternal plate had been recovered. Since 2003 much more extensive finds have been made and much of the skeleton is now known.

== Description ==
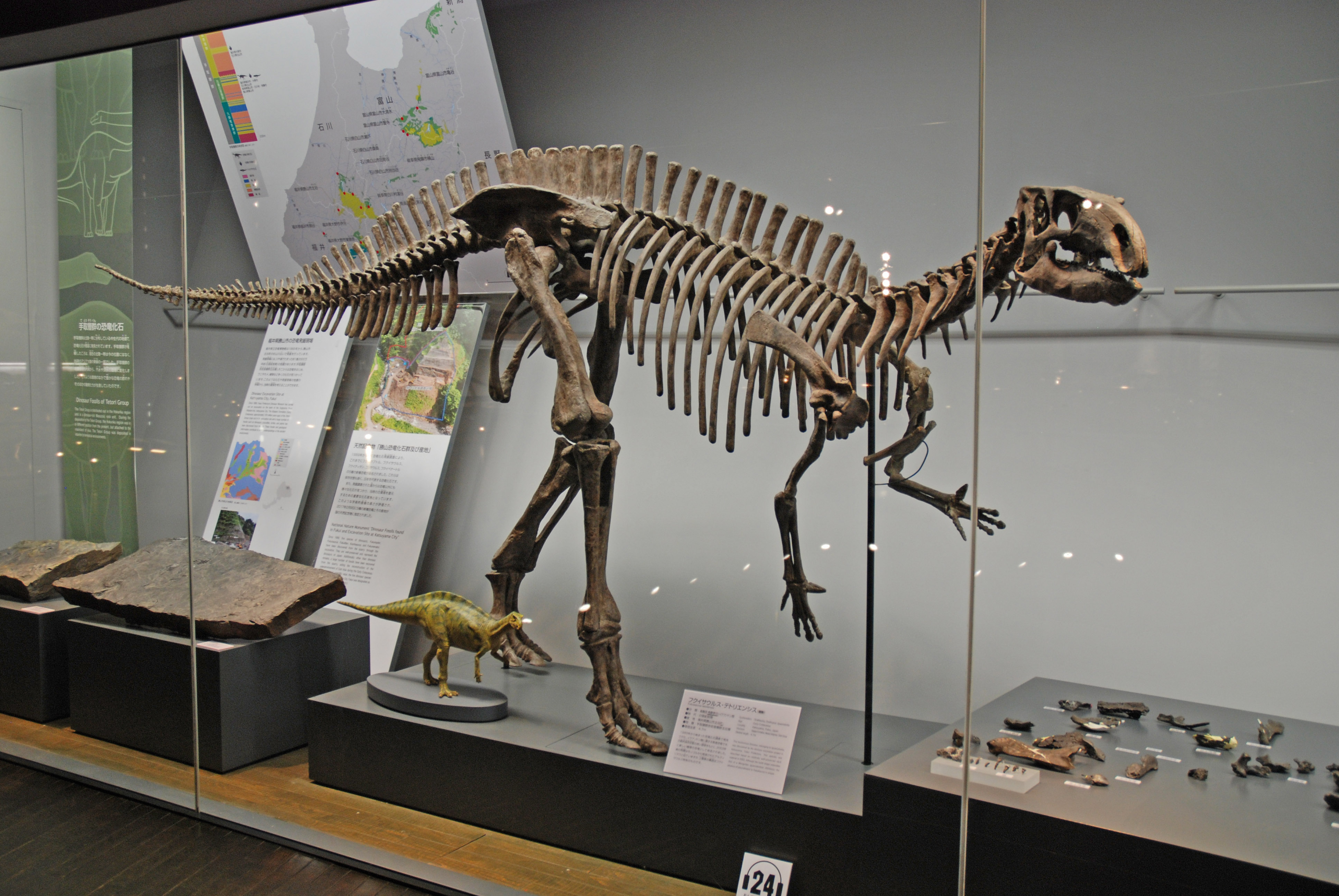
Reconstructed skeleton with holotype fossils in lower right

Fukuisaurus was a relatively small ornithopod. In 2010 Gregory S. Paul estimated its length at 4.5 meters and its weight at 400 kg. Being a bipedal, optionally quadrupedal, animal, it was similar in general build to Iguanodon, Ouranosaurus and Altirhinus. According to the describers Fukuisaurus was exceptional in that its skull was not kinetic: the tooth-bearing maxilla would be so strongly fused to the vomer that a sideways chewing motion would have been impossible.

== Classification ==
Fukuisaurus was assigned by its describers to Iguanodontia, although the presence of a posterolateral process of the sternum indicated that it likely also belongs to Styracosterna. Their cladistic analysis showed that Fukuisaurus was more derived than Iguanodon and Ouranosaurus, but less derived than Altirhinus. Ramírez-Velasco et al. (2012) found Fukuisaurus to be a basal member of Hadrosauroidea, while Bertozzo et al. (2017) recovered it as a non-hadrosauroid styracostern.
