= Fukui Prefectural University =

University in Fukui Prefecture, Japan

Coordinates: 36°6′34.83″N 136°16′39.25″E

- 福井県立大学
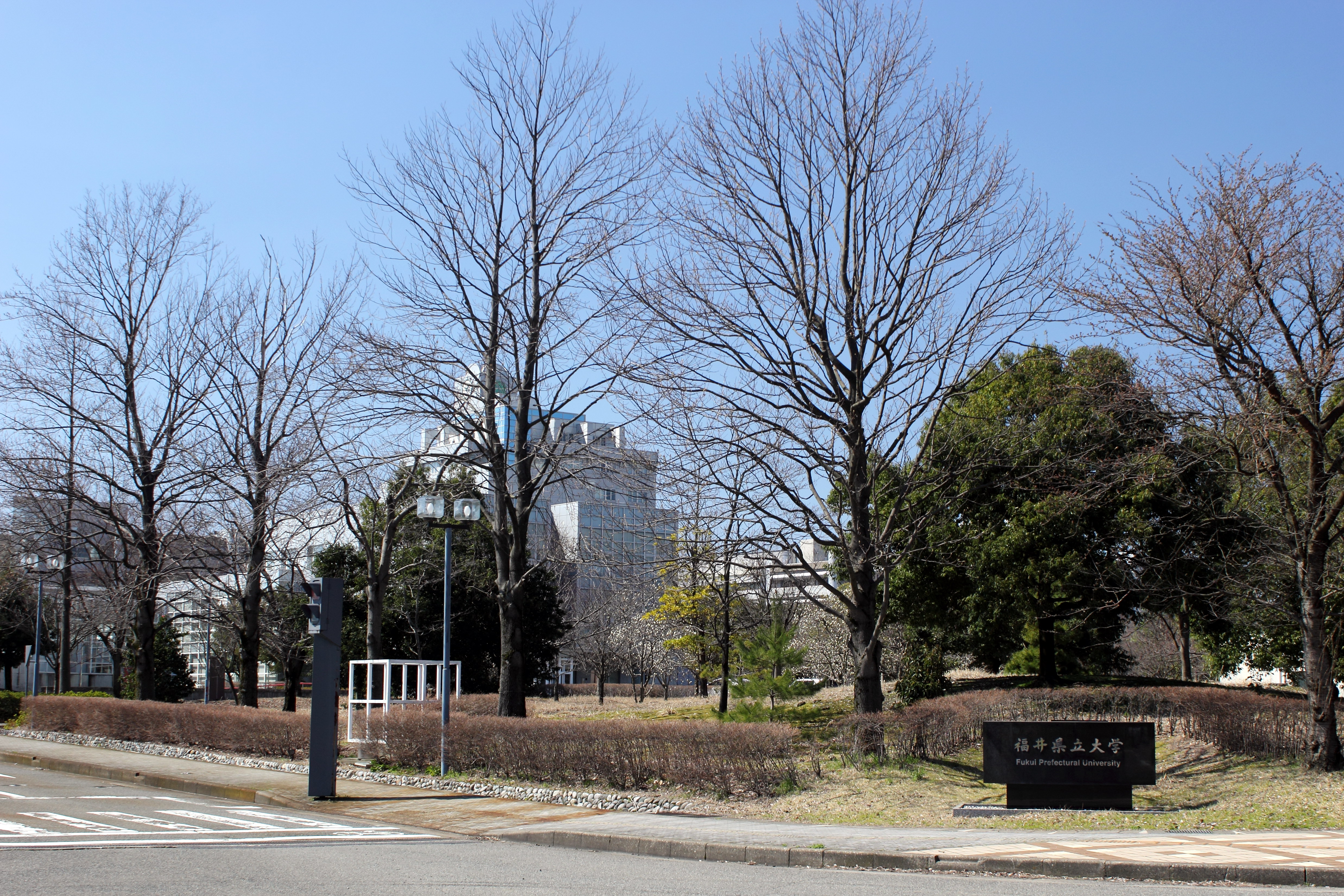
- Fukui Prefectural University
- Type: Public
- Established: 1992
- President: Isoya Shinji
- Administrative staff: 164 (2014)
- Undergraduates: 1,625 (2014)
- Postgraduates: 194 (2014)
- Location: Eiheiji, Fukui, Japan
- Website: www.fpu.ac.jp
- Logo of Fukui Prefectural University

Fukui Prefectural University (福井県立大学, Fukui Kenritsu Daigaku) is a public prefectural university founded in 1992 in Eiheiji, Yoshida District, Fukui Prefecture, Japan. It has undergraduate faculties in economics, biotechnology, marine bioscience, and nursing and social welfare sciences. There are graduate programs in economics and business administration, bioscience and biotechnology, and nursing and social welfare science.
