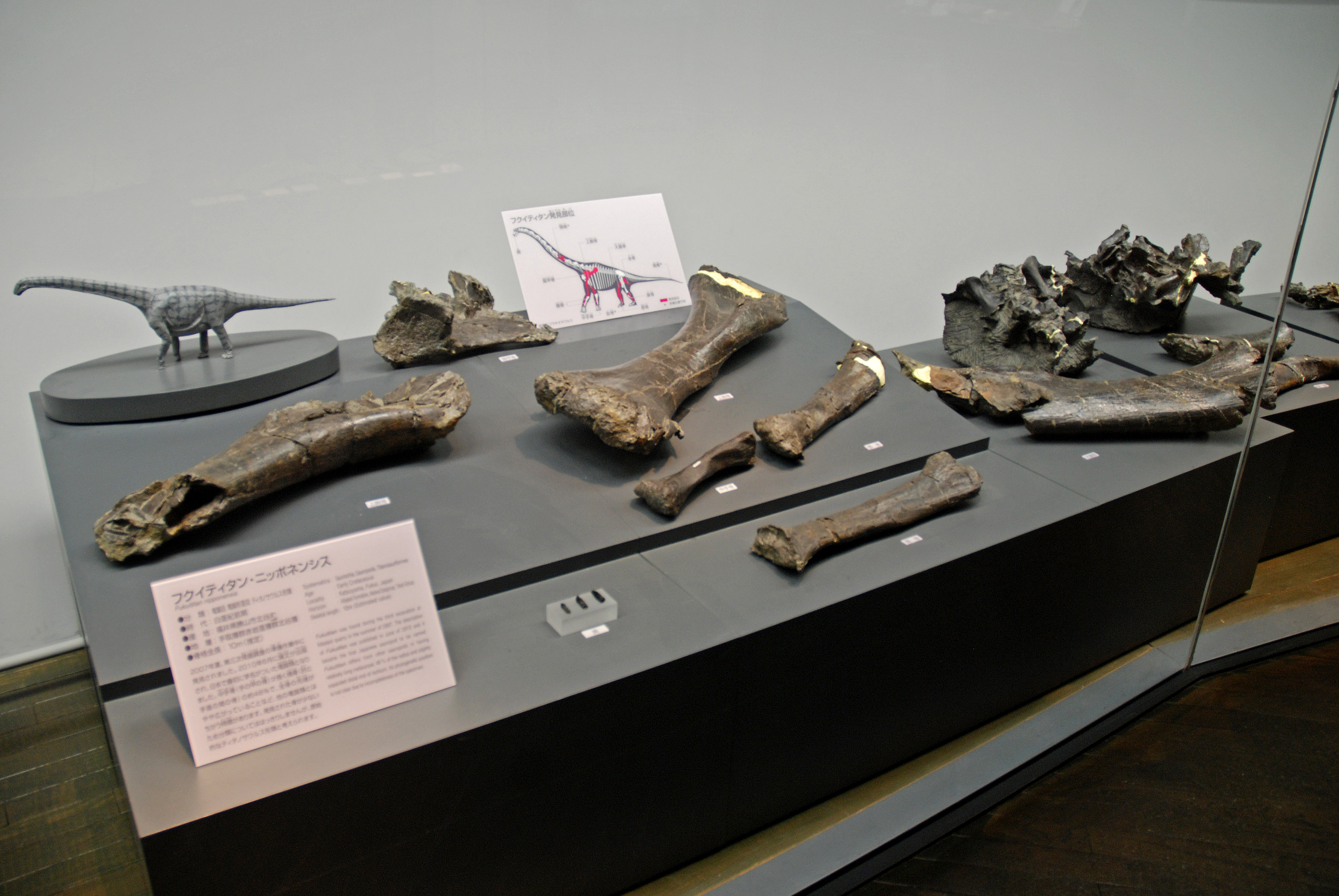
- Fossil elements on display in Japan

Scientific classification
- Kingdom: Animalia
- Phylum: Chordata
- Class: Reptilia
- Clade: Dinosauria
- Clade: Saurischia
- Clade: †Sauropodomorpha
- Clade: †Sauropoda
- Clade: †Macronaria
- Clade: †Titanosauriformes
- Genus: †Fukuititan; Azuma & Shibata, 2010

Type species
- Fukuititan nipponensis Azuma & Shibata, 2010

= Fukuititan =

Fukuititan Temporal range: Early Cretaceous, 127–115 Ma

Extinct genus of dinosaurs

Fukuititan (meaning "giant from Fukui prefecture") is a genus of sauropod dinosaur that lived during the Early Cretaceous (either Barremian or Aptian age) in the Kitadani Formation in what is now Japan. The genus contains a single species, Fukuititan nipponensis. The discovery of Fukuititan shed light on Japanese titanosauriforms, which are generally very poorly-known.

== Discovery and naming ==
The fossils that would eventually be named Fukuititan were discovered in the summer of 2007 at the Kitadani Dinosaur Quarry, near the Sugiyama River, by an expedition in association with the Fukui Prefectural Dinosaur Museum, which is where the specimen would eventually be reposited. The holotype and only specimen of Fukuititan, given the specimen number FPDM-V8468, was described in 2010 by Japanese scientists Yoichi Azuma and Masateru Shibata, who were working for the museum in which it was stored. It was given the species epithet "nipponensis", which means "from Japan".

== Description ==
Fukuititan was a medium-sized sauropod. The authors of its description did not give a precise estimate of its size, but subsequent authors have suggested a full length of 16.1 m (53 ft) long, a height of 5.75 m (18.9 ft) tall at the shoulder, and a mass of 5.75 t (5.66 long tons; 6.34 short tons). Gregory S. Paul later suggested that the holotype of Fukuititan represents an immature individual, and therefore no concrete estimates of its adult size can be made.

The holotype specimen was discovered within an area of 150 square metres (1,600 sq ft). In spite of this being a relatively large area, the lack of repeated elements led Azuma and Shibata to infer that all of the remains represent a single individual. The elements known include two partial cervical vertebrae, three vertebrae from the end of the tail, part of the left scapula, both humeri, both radii, a right metacarpal, both ischia, a partial right femur and tibia, the left fibula, a single toe bone, three teeth, and several indeterminate bone fragments. Fukuititan can be distinguished from all other titanosauriformes by the presence of a stalk-like epipophysis of the cervical vertebrae, a relatively wide humerus, metacarpals about half the length of the radius, and several features of the teeth.

== Classification ==
The lack of any remains from the skull or ribs of Fukuititan makes its affinities somewhat difficult to determine. Features of the caudal vertebrae and the co-ossification of the ischia lend support to its inclusion within Titanosauriformes. However, when they described Fukuititan, Azuma and Shibata remarked that a more specific phylogenetic placement was impossible to assign based on the incompleteness of the remains. Some subsequent analyses have omitted Fukuititan from their phylogenetic analyses because its incomplete nature makes its placement unstable. Other authors have suggested that it is closely related to Tastavinsaurus and its relatives. An abbreviated cladogram from a 2024 analysis by Yang F. Han and colleagues is shown below.

- Titanosauriformes
  - Brachiosauridae
  - Somphospondyli
    - - Astrophocaudia
      - - Brontomerus
        - Malarguesaurus
        - Sauroposeidon
    - - Unnamed clade
        - - Europatitan
          - Tastavinsaurus
        - - Fukuititan
          - - Dongbeititan
            - Ligabuesaurus
          - - Angolatitan
            - - Chubutisaurus
              - Cloverly titanosauriform
      - - Euhelopodidae
        - Titanosauria

== See also ==
- 2010 in archosaur paleontology
- List of Asian dinosaurs
- List of sauropod species
- List of sauropodomorph type specimens
