= Meilynodraco =

Meilynodraco Temporal range: Late Jurassic, early Kimmeridgian
- Rendering of the holotype specimen (A–C) and reconstructed skeleton (D)

Scientific classification
- Kingdom: Animalia
- Phylum: Chordata
- Class: Reptilia
- Order: †Choristodera
- Genus: †Meilynodraco; Scheyer, Sobral, Buffa & Pople, 2026
- Species: †M. amonamarthi

Binomial name
- †Meilynodraco amonamarthi Scheyer, Sobral, Buffa & Pople, 2026

Genus of extinct reptile

Meilynodraco (lit. 'Meilyn Quarry dragon') is an extinct genus of early-diverging choristodere reptile known from the Upper Jurassic (Kimmeridgian age) Morrison Formation of Wyoming, United States. The genus contains a single species, Meilynodraco amonamarthi, known from a partially articulated skeleton and associated skull. It is the oldest choristodere known from North America, and the second member of this clade named from the Morrison Formation, following Cteniogenys, which is not known from articulated remains.

== Discovery and naming ==
Discovery of the M. amonamarthi holotype

A team from the Swiss Aathal Dinosaur Museum discovered the Meilynodraco fossil material in the summer of 2022 while conducting fieldwork on private property owned by the Wyoming Dinosaur Center Foundation near Medicine Bow, Wyoming, United States. This site, the Meilyn Quarry, represents outcrops of the Lake Como Member of the lower Morrison Formation, which is equivalent to the biostratigraphic level 'zone 1'. The specimen was brought to Switzerland for further study, including imaging by neutron and X-ray computed tomography (forms of CT scanning). It is now housed at the Wyoming Dinosaur Center, where it is permanently accessioned as specimen WDC-DMQ-288. It consists of a partial skeleton, including most of an articulated vertebral column and the pelvic girdle, along with various hindlimb bones, preserved on multiple slabs and counterslabs. Several cranial bones are associated with the skeleton, preserved in smaller blocks.

In 2026, Torsten M. Scheyer and colleagues described Meilynodraco amonamarthi as a new genus and species of choristodere based on these fossil remains, designating WDC-DMQ-288 as the holotype specimen. The generic name, Meilynodraco, combines a reference to the type locality (Meilyn Quarry) with the Latinized form of drakōn, a Greek word meaning 'dragon' or 'serpent'. The specific name, amonamarthi, alludes to Amon Amarth, a Swedish metal band, the name of which is in turn derived from the Sindarin (a fictional language) word for Mount Doom, a location in J. R. R. Tolkien's fantasy writings.

CT renderings of the M. amonamarthi holotype
Skull

Postcranium

== Description ==
Meilynodraco was relatively small in size, estimated at 45 centimetres (18 in) long. The upper surface of the orbit is largely formed by the frontal bone. In contrast to Champsosaurus, the prootic bone of the skull is relatively large.

== Classification ==
To test the affinities and relationships of Meilynodraco, Scheyer et al. (2026) included it in an updated version of the phylogenetic matrix of Dudgeon et al. (2023). This dataset is focused on the interrelationships of choristoderes, a group of superficially lizard- or crocodile-like reptiles whose relationships with other reptiles have been debated. They recovered Meilynodraco alongside the Chinese Heishanosaurus, as the earliest-diverging members of Choristodera, in an unresolved polytomy with all other members of this clade. These results are displayed in the cladogram below. ⊞ symbols can be clicked to expand clades.

- †Choristodera
  - Heishanosaurus pygmaeus
  - Meilynodraco amonamarthi
  - - Coeruleodraco jurassicus
    - Allochoristodera
      ⊞
      - Monjurosuchus splendens
      - Philydrosaurus proseilus
      - - - Lazarussuchus dvoraki
          - Lazarussuchus inexpectatus
          - Lazarussuchus sp.
        - - Hyphalosaurus lingyuanensis
          - Khurendukhosaurus spp.
          - Shokawa ikoi
      ⊟
    - - Cteniogenys antiquus
      - Neochoristodera
        ⊞
        - Ikechosaurus pijiagouensis
        - Ikechosaurus sunailinae
        - Tchoiria klauseni
        - Tchoiria namsari
        - - Simoedosaurus lemoinei
          - - Kosmodraco dakotensis
            - Kosmodraco magnicornis
        - Champsosaurus norelli
        - - Champsosaurus albertensis
          - Champsosaurus gigas
          - - Champsosaurus lindoei
            - - Champsosaurus laramiensis
              - Champsosaurus natator
        ⊟

== See also ==
- Paleobiota of the Morrison Formation
