= Meng-Yin Formation =

Geological formation in Shandong, China

- Stratigraphic range: Berriasian-Valanginian; ~145–133 Ma
- Type: Geological formation

Lithology
- Primary: Sandstone
- Other: Siltstone

Location
- Coordinates: 35.9°N 118.0°E
- Approximate paleocoordinates: 36.9°N 120.2°E
- Region: Shandong
- Country: China
- Meng-Yin Formation (China) Meng-Yin Formation (Shandong)

The Meng-Yin or Mengyin Formation (simplified Chinese: 蒙阴组; traditional Chinese: 蒙陰組; pinyin: Méngyīn Zǔ) is a geological formation in Shandong, China, whose strata date back to the Berriasian and Valanginian stages of the Early Cretaceous.

Dinosaur remains are among the fossils that have been recovered from the formation. The type material for the titanosauriform dinosaur Euhelopus was excavated at this formation by Otto Zdansky in 1923, in green/yellow sandstone and green/yellow siltstone that were deposited during the Barremian or Aptian stages of the Cretaceous period, approximately 129 to 113 million years ago.

Both the genus and species of Mengyinaia mengyinensis were named after the formation.

== Vertebrate paleofauna ==
Indeterminate stegosaurid remains have been found in Shandong, China.

Vertebrates from the Meng-Yin Formation
Genus	Species	Location	Stratigraphic position	Material	Notes	Images
Euhelopus	E. zdanskyi	Shandong		"Skull and partial postcranial skeleton, additional fragmentary skeleton."		
Mengshanosaurus	M. minimus			A single juvenile skull	A choristodere belonging to Neochoristodera	

=== Other fossils ===
- Mengyinaia mengyinensis

Fish

- Sinamia zdanskyi
- Paralycoptera wui
- Lycoptera sp.

Reptiles

- Ordosemys leios
- Shantungosuchus chuhsienensis
- Sinemys lens
- Sinochelys applanata
- ?Dsungaripteridae indet.
- Stegosauria indet.

== See also ==
- List of dinosaur-bearing rock formations
