= Mengshanosaurus =

Mengshanosaurus Temporal range: Early Cretaceous Berriasian–Valanginian

Scientific classification
- Domain: Eukaryota
- Kingdom: Animalia
- Phylum: Chordata
- Class: Reptilia
- Order: †Choristodera
- Suborder: †Neochoristodera
- Genus: †Mengshanosaurus; Meng et al., 2021

Type species
- †Mengshanosaurus minimus Meng et al., 2021

Extinct genus of reptiles

Mengshanosaurus is an extinct genus of choristodere from the Early Cretaceous Meng-Yin Formation of China. The type and only known species is M. minimus, known from a juvenile skull, around 3.5 cm long. It was found to be the basalmost neochoristodere.
