= Liaoxisaurus =

Liaoxisaurus Temporal range: Early Cretaceous

Scientific classification
- Domain: Eukaryota
- Kingdom: Animalia
- Phylum: Chordata
- Class: Reptilia
- Order: †Choristodera
- Suborder: †Neochoristodera
- Genus: †Liaoxisaurus; Gao C. et al., 2005

Species
- †L. chaoyangensis Gao C. et al., 2005 (type)

Extinct genus of reptiles

Liaoxisaurus is a genus of choristodere, a type of crocodile-like aquatic reptile. It is known from a partial specimen found in Aptian-age Lower Cretaceous rocks of the Jiufotang Formation, Chaoyang, Liaoning, China. Liaoxisaurus was named in 2005 by Gao Chunling, Lü Junchang, and colleagues. The type species is L. chaoyangensis.
