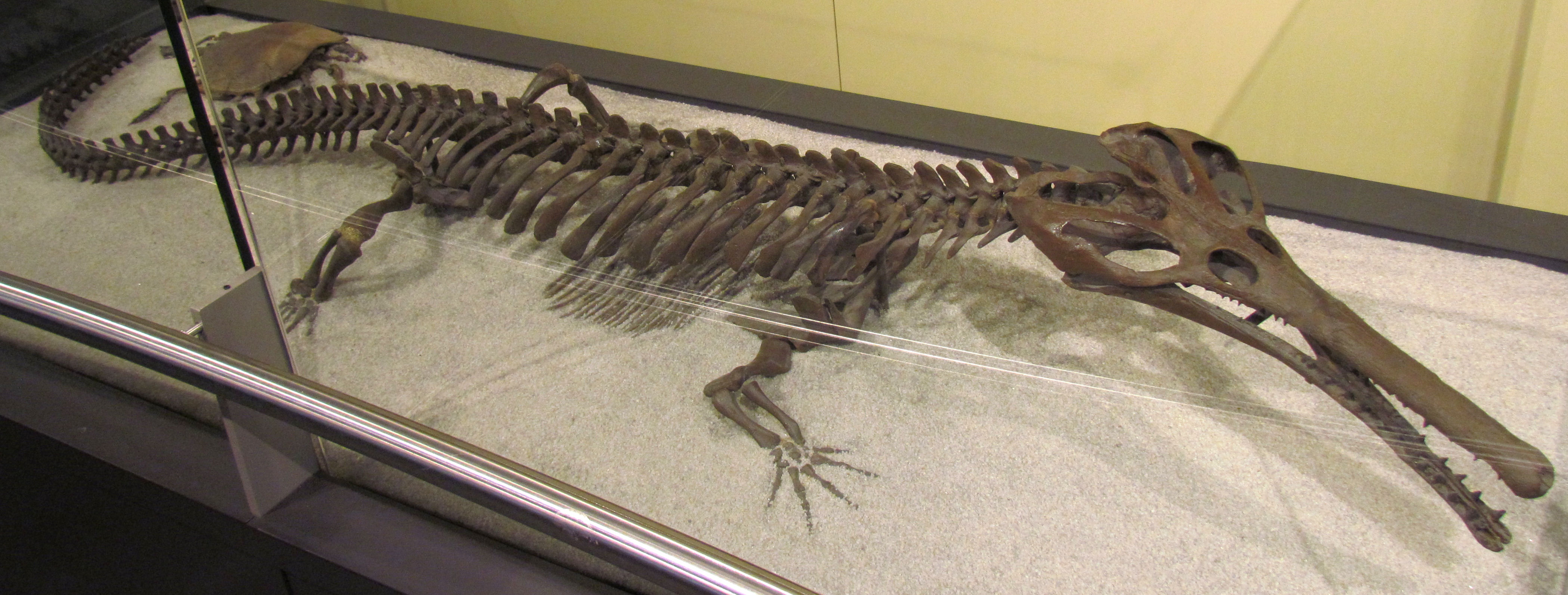
- Skeletal mount of Champsosaurus

Scientific classification
- Kingdom: Animalia
- Phylum: Chordata
- Class: Reptilia
- Order: †Choristodera
- Suborder: †Neochoristodera; Evans & Hecht, 1993

Genera
- †Champsosaurus; †Ikechosaurus; †Kosmodraco; †Liaoxisaurus; †Mengshanosaurus; †Simoedosaurus; †Tchoiria

Synonyms
- Champsosauriformes Hay 1930

= Neochoristodera =

Neochoristodera Temporal range: Early Cretaceous - Eocene, 145–56 Ma

Extinct suborder of reptiles

Neochoristodera is a lineage of specialised crocodile-like fully aquatic choristodere reptiles. Noted for their long jaws and large size, these animals were predominant across the Northern Hemisphere, occurring in freshwater and coastal environments across the Cretaceous and early Cenozoic.

== Systematics ==
Neochoristoderes form a monophyletic group, however there is no consensus about the relationships of the genera, which have been recovered as a polytomy in recent studies. Neochoristodera contains the named genera Champsosaurus, Ikechosaurus, Kosmodraco, Liaoxisaurus, Mengshanosaurus, Simoedosaurus and Tchoiria. Various taxa of uncertain affinities within this group are known, including a partial femur of a choristodere, possibly of a neochoristodere from the Cedar Mountain Formation of the United States and an indeterminate partial skeleton from the Kuwajima Formation of Japan.

== Evolution ==
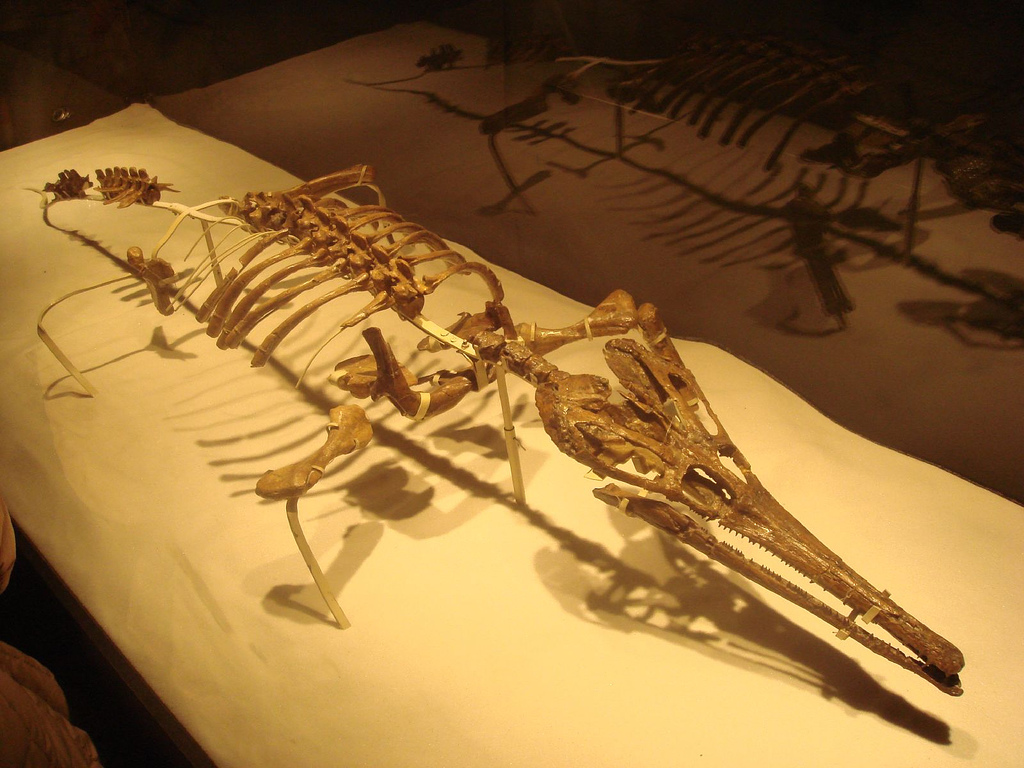
Skeleton of Tchoiria

Neochoristoderes first appear in the Early Cretaceous of Asia, where they co-exist with other choristodere groups like monjurosuchids and hyphalosaurids. Here, a regional absence of aquatic crocodilians, possibly due to colder temperatures, seems to have opened the ecological niche for these choristoderes to occupy a similar ecological niche. The oldest known neochoristodere is Mengshanosaurus, from the Berriasian-Valanginian aged Mengyin Formation of China.

Other than a possible specimen from the Cedar Mountain Formation, a large gap occurs between these Early Cretaceous faunas and the Late Cretaceous ones. There are no fossils of neochoristoderes in the Asian Late Cretaceous, but the subsequent distribution of Simoedosaurus in the Paleocene and Eocene implies that there were Asian taxa around this time, seeing as Simoedosauridae is predominantly Asian and Simoedosaurus only propagated widely after the KT event.

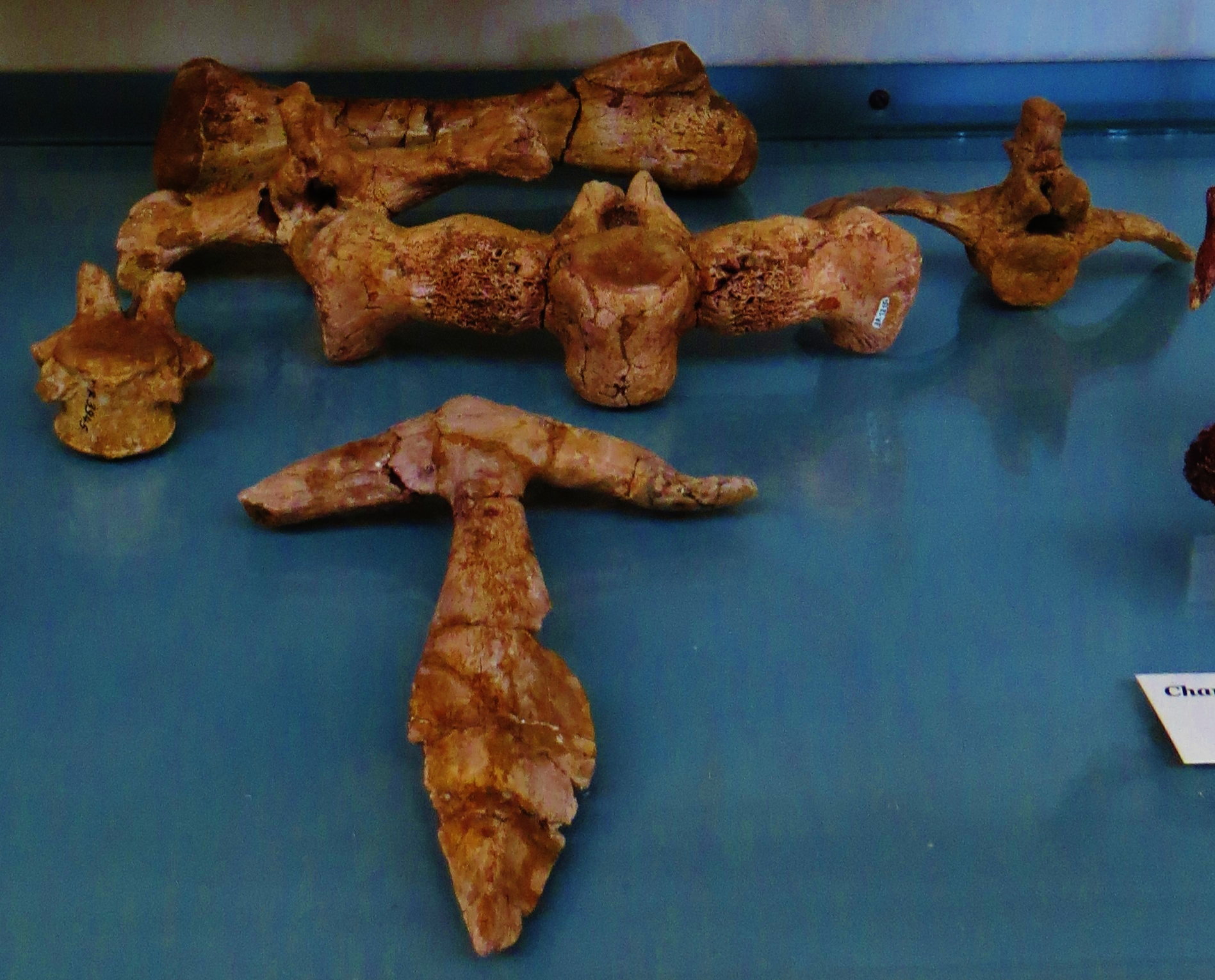
Fossils of Simoedosaurus

Choristoderes reappear in the fossil record in the Campanian of North America under the genus Champsosaurus. This genus survives the KT event unscathed and diversifies in the aftermath, being soon after joined by Simoedosaurus. Both taxa remain at high latitudes in North America and Europe until the Eocene, when they mysteriously disappear.

In 2021, fossil remains of indetermine neochoristoderes were described from several sites from the Navesink Formation and Marshalltown Formation (Ellisdale Fossil Site) of New Jersey, marking the first known occurrence of neochoristoderes from the former landmass Appalachia. Niche modeling based on the presumed niche of Champsosaurus indicates that neochoristoderes may have had a widespread distribution in Appalachia, but the majority of this habitat was not located in areas conducive for Cretaceous fossilization, leading to only a small margin of optimal habitat in New Jersey that preserved choristodere remains.

Competition from crocodilians has been at times implicated in the extinction of neochoristoderes. There appears to be a niche partitioning between neochoristoderes and long-snouted crocodilians such as gharials, which are absent from freshwater sites in Laurasia until well after neochoristoderes disappear, but competition between both groups, if it even existed, is currently unaccounted for. Ultimately, both Champsosaurus and Simoedosaurus co-existed with a variety of broad-snouted species like alligatorids and Borealosuchus.

== Biology ==
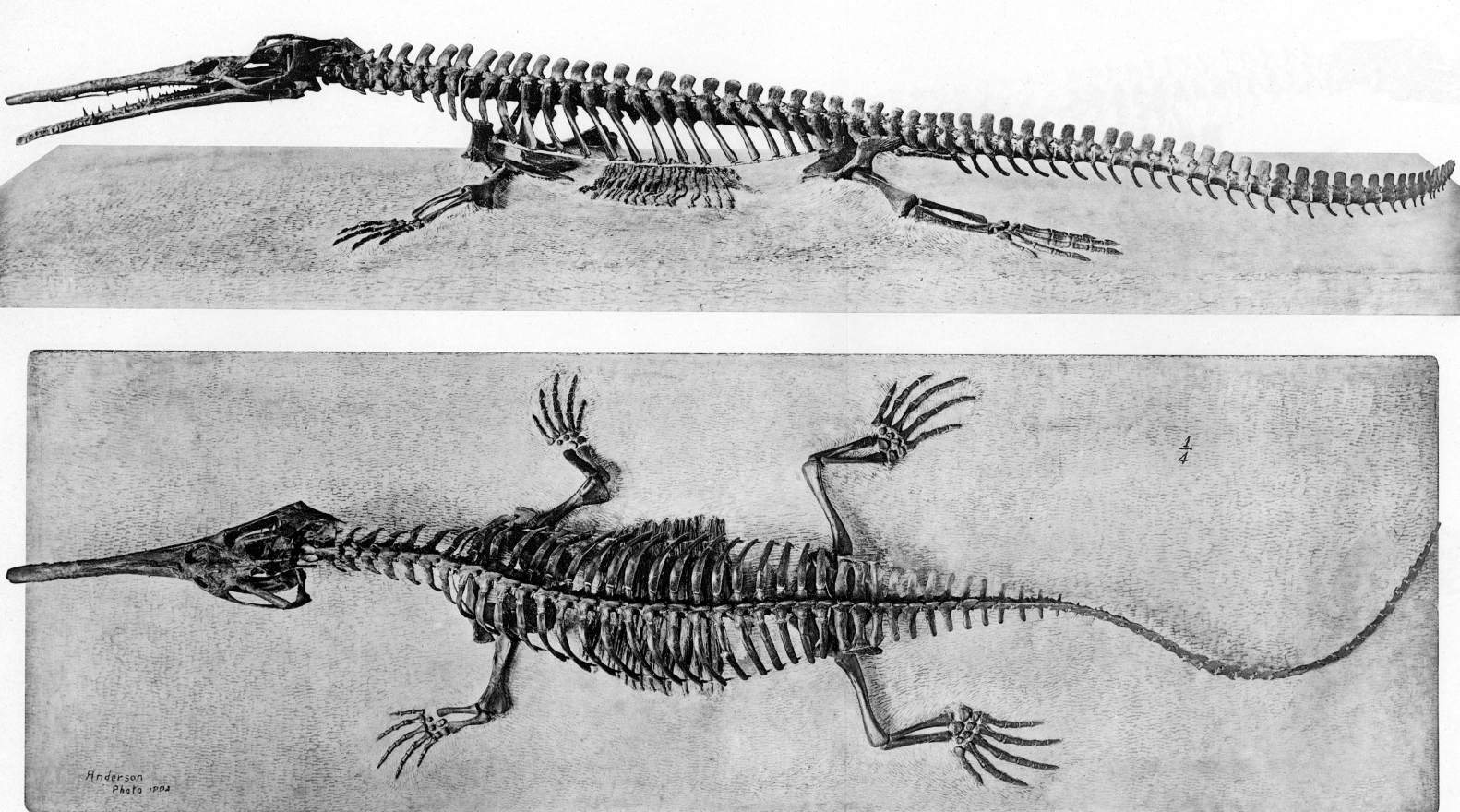
Lateral and dorsal views of a Champsosaurus skeletal mount

Neochoristoderes are thought to be fully aquatic. They possess laterally flattened, muscular tails and paddle-like limbs, their torsos are dorsoventrally flattened with short but massive ribs and their gastralia are heavily ossified, facilitating sinking. While they have their nostrils at the end of the snout as in crocodiles, they are oriented towards the tip instead of dorsally; their eye sockets are similarly forward-facing, implying that these animals did not surface often and probably simply rose the snout in a snorkel-like fashion. As in most choristoderes the skin lacks scutes, instead having small, non-overlapping scales. In Champsosaurus adult females are thought to have particularly ossified limbs and pelvises, implying that they could crawl unto land, while adult males and juveniles could not. As most choristoderes are thought to have been ovoviviparous or viviparous, it is likely that at least some neochoristoderes were too.

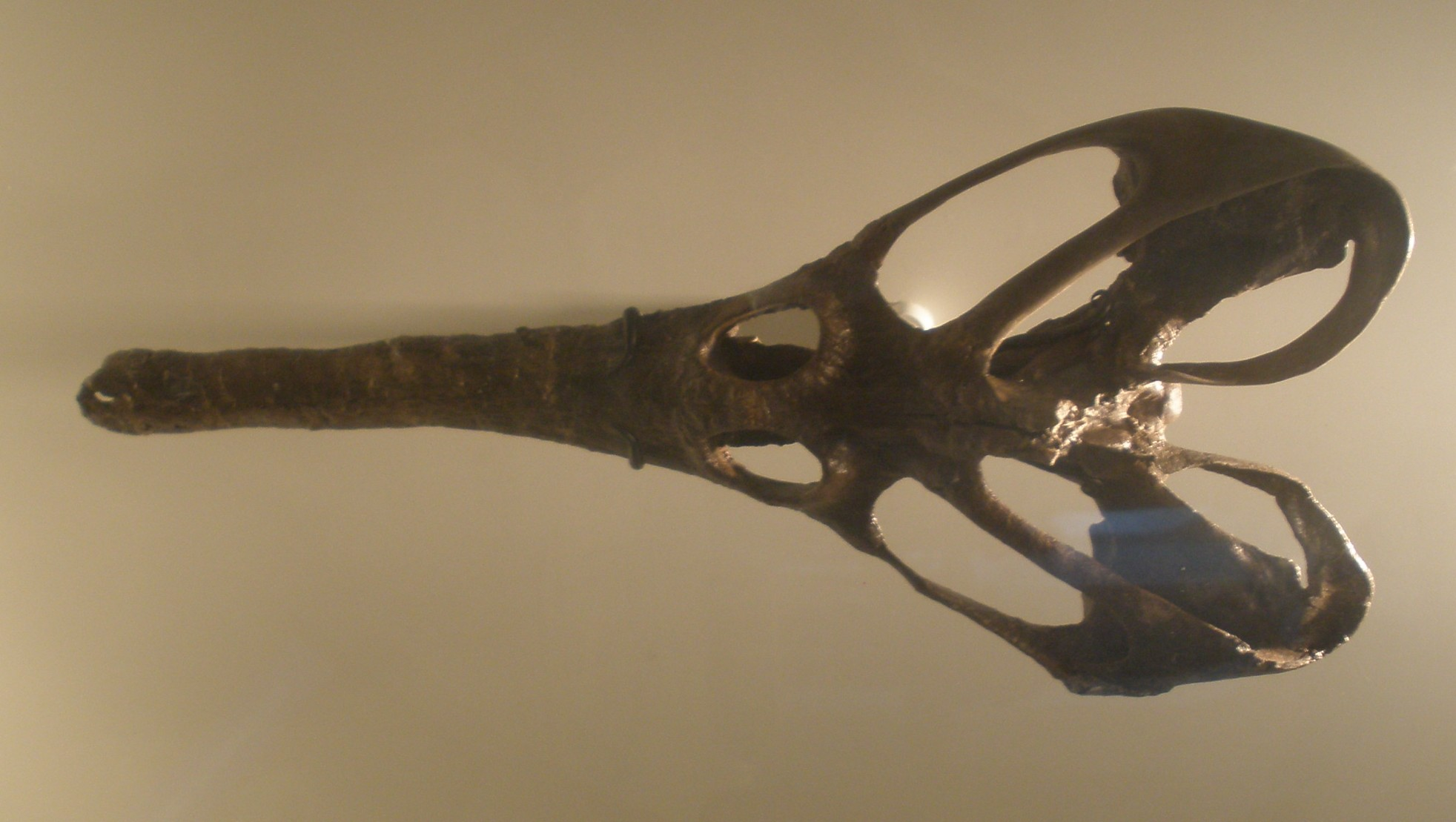
Champsosaurus skull

Most neochoristoderes have exceptionally large temporal fenestrae, suggesting powerful bite forces; Champsosaurus is estimated to have a bite force around 1194 to 1910 N, as opposed to the modern gharial's 310-497 N. In spite of this, most are thought to have had a diet similar to that of modern gharials due to the long and slender jaws, though Simoedosaurus has a more robust and shorter snout and could have fed on larger prey.

Compared with other choristoderes, which have rather simple teeth, neochoristoderes have teeth completely enveloped in striated enamel with an enamel infolding at the base, labiolingually compressed and hooked, the exception being Ikechosaurus which has still rather simple teeth aside from the start of an enamel infolding. There is some tooth differentiation, with the anterior teeth being larger than the posterior ones. As with most choristoderes, neochoristoderes have palatal teeth, indicating food manipulation in the mouth.

Nearly all neochoristodere remains occur at high latitudes, suggesting a preference for temperate climates. Champsosaurus fossils are known in the Canadian Arctic and Greenland.
