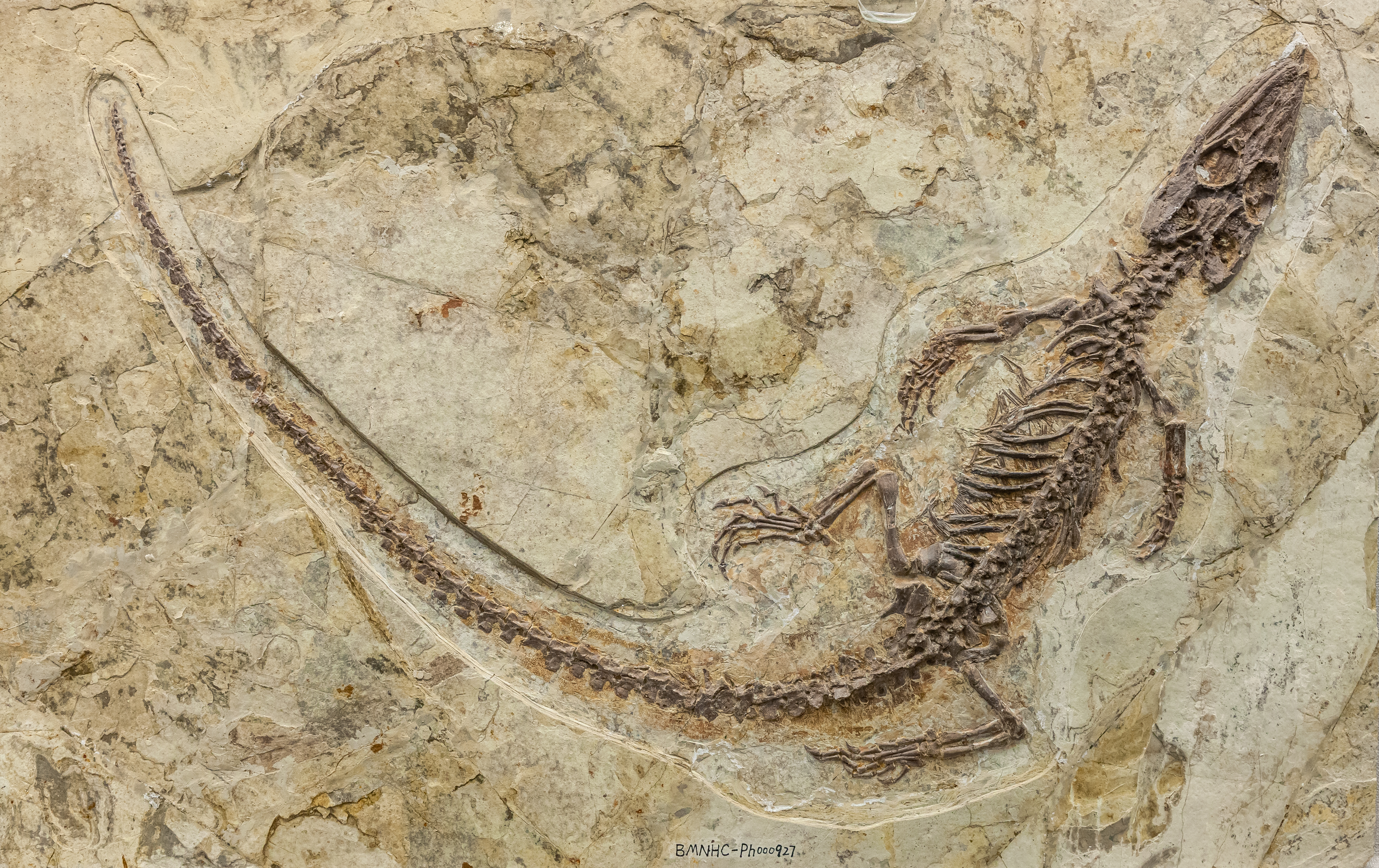
- Skeleton of Philydrosaurus proseilus exhibited at the National Museum of Natural Science, Taiwan
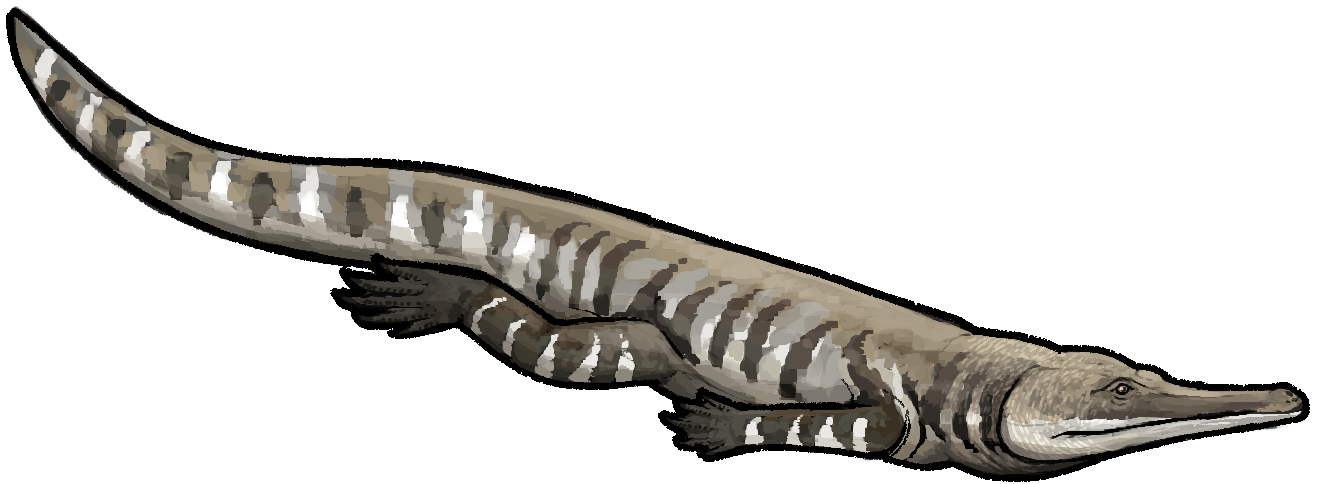
- Life restoration of Champsosaurus laramiensis

Scientific classification
- Kingdom: Animalia
- Phylum: Chordata
- Class: Reptilia
- Clade: Neodiapsida
- Order: †Choristodera; Cope, 1876

Subgroups
- †Coeruleodraco; †Cteniogenys; †Heishanosaurus; †Irenosaurus; †Meilynodraco; †"Allochoristodera" Dong et al., 2020; †Lazarussuchus; †Monjurosuchus; †Philydrosaurus; †Hyphalosaurus; †Khurendukhosaurus; †Shokawa; †Neochoristodera Evans & Hecht, 1993; †Champsosaurus; †Kosmodraco; †Ikechosaurus; †Liaoxisaurus; †Mengshanosaurus; †Simoedosaurus; †Tchoiria

= Choristodera =

Choristodera Temporal range: Middle Jurassic – Miocene, 168–11.6 Ma Potential Triassic records

Extinct order of reptiles

Choristodera (from the Greek χωριστός chōristos + δέρη dérē, 'separated neck') is an extinct order of semiaquatic diapsid reptiles that ranged from the Middle Jurassic, or possibly Triassic, to the Miocene (168 to 20 or possibly 11.6 million years ago). Choristoderes are morphologically diverse, with the best known members being the crocodile-like neochoristoderes such as Champsosaurus. Other choristoderans had lizard-like or long necked morphologies. Choristoderes appear to have been confined to the Northern Hemisphere, having been found in North America, Asia, and Europe, and possibly also North Africa. Choristoderes are generally thought to be derived neodiapsids that are close relatives or members of Sauria.

== History of discovery ==
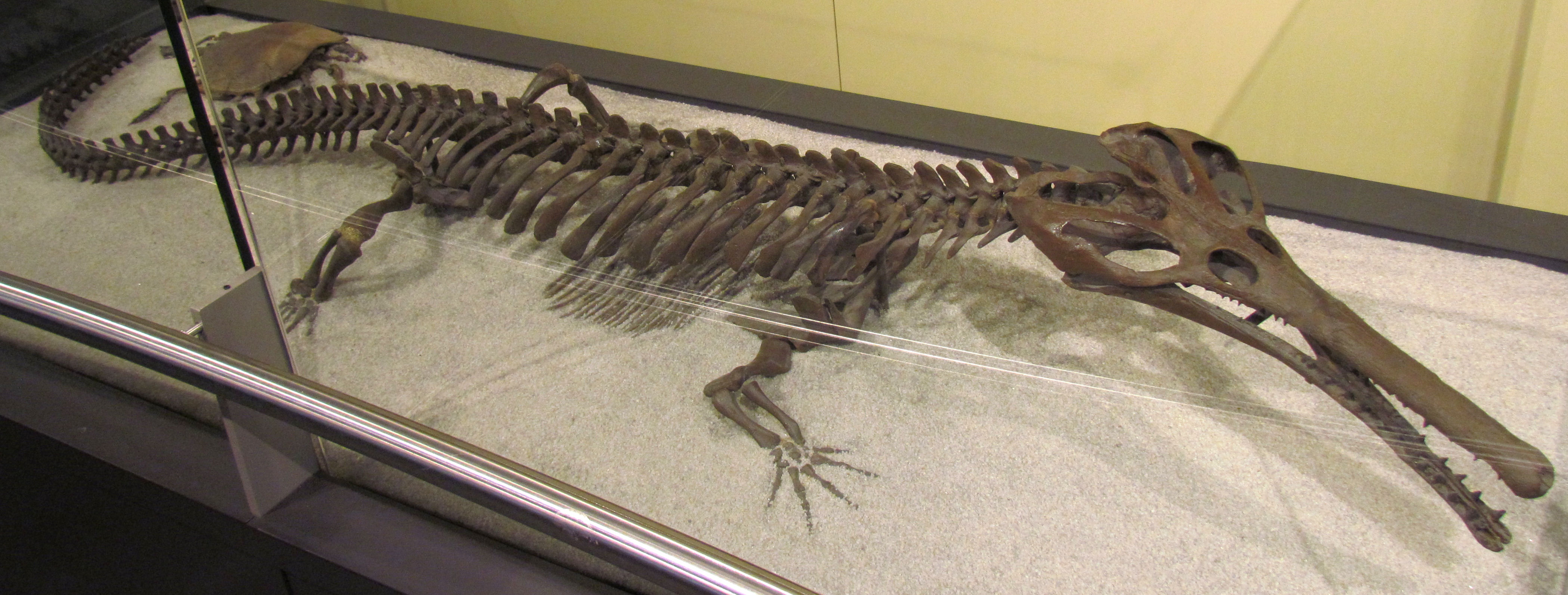
Skeleton of Champsosaurus natator at the Canadian Museum of Nature

Choristodera was erected in 1876, originally as a suborder of Rhynchocephalia by Edward Drinker Cope to contain Champsosaurus, which was described from Late Cretaceous strata of Montana by Cope in the same paper. A year later, in 1877, Simoedosaurus was described by Paul Gervais from Upper Paleocene deposits at Cernay, near Rheims, France. These remained the only recognised choristoderes for over a century, until new taxa were described in the late 20th century. Beginning in the late 1970s, additional taxa were described by Soviet-Mongolian teams from Lower Cretaceous sediments in Mongolia. In studies from 1989 to 1991, Susan E. Evans described new material of Cteniogenys from the Middle Jurassic of Britain. The genus had first been described by Charles W. Gilmore in 1928 from the Late Jurassic of the western United States, and had previously been enigmatic. The studies revealed it to be a small, lizard-like choristodere, different from the crocodile-like forms previously known.

== Description ==
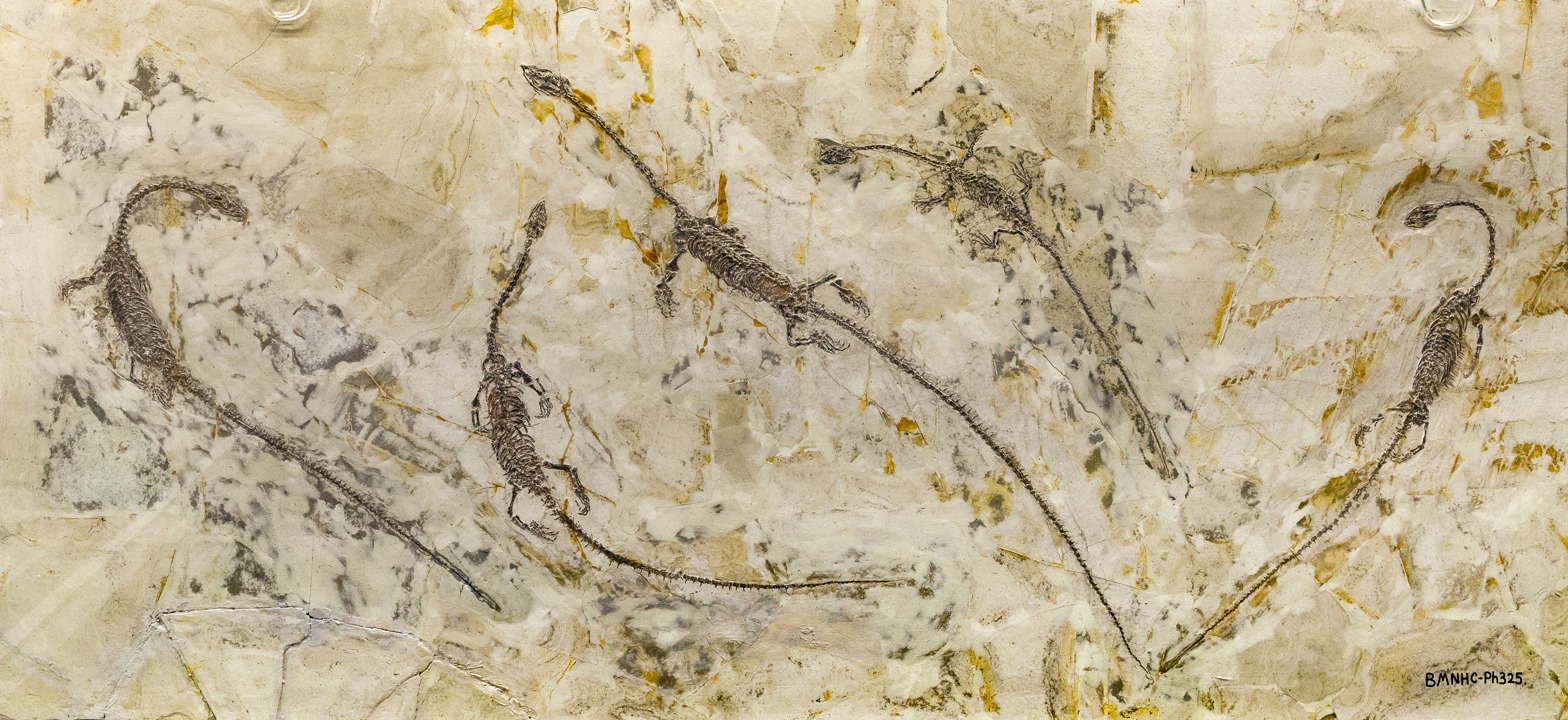
Skeletons of Hyphalosaurus in the collections of the Beijing Museum of Natural History (BMNH)

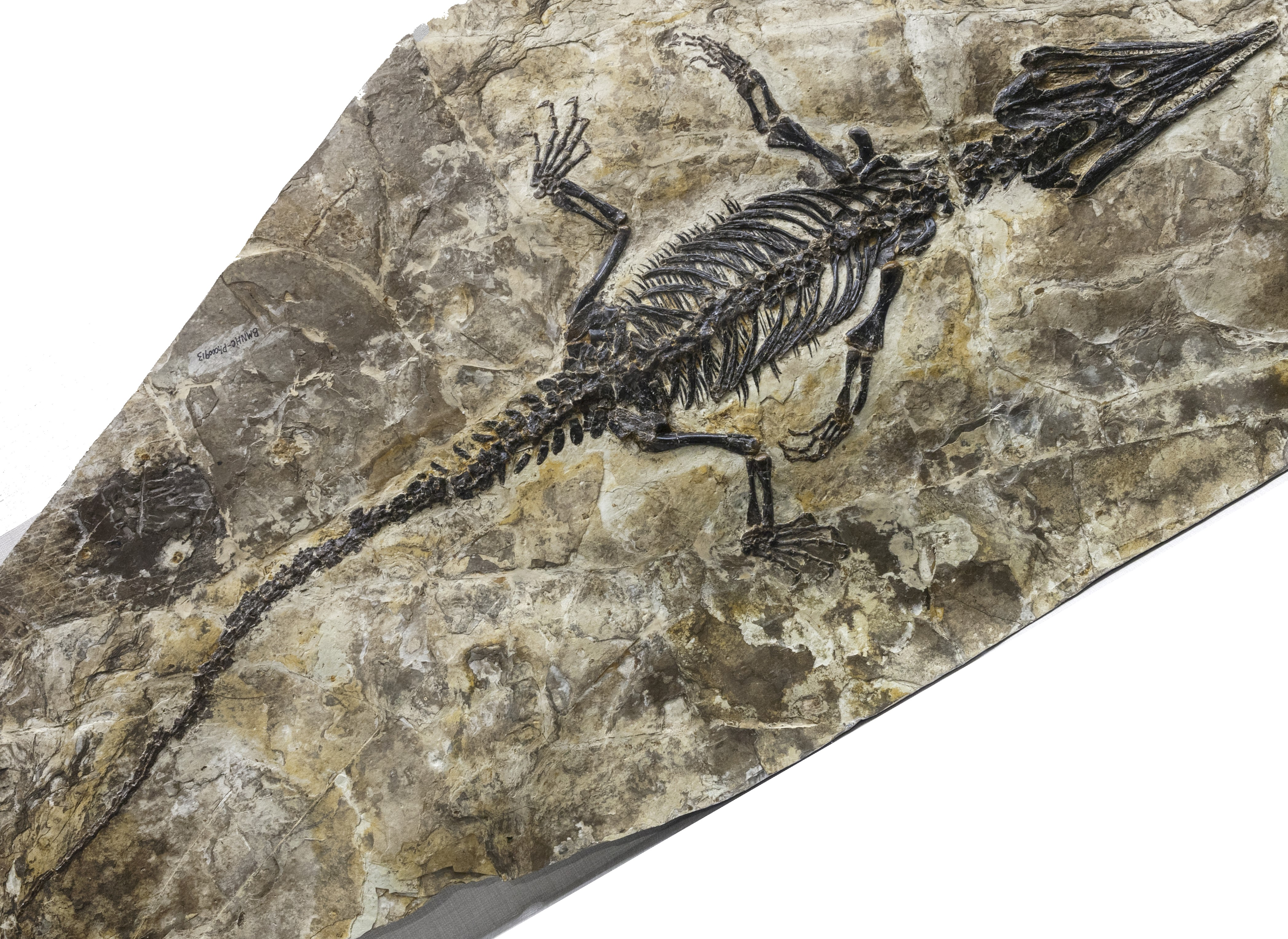
Skeleton of Ikechosaurus, on display at National Museum of Natural Science, Taiwan

Choristoderes vary substantially in size, the smallest genera like Cteniogenys and Lazarussuchus had a length of only around 30 cm (12 in), and the largest known choristoderan, Kosmodraco dakotensis is estimated to have had a total length of around 5 m (16 ft). Neochoristoderes such as Champsosaurus are the best-known group of the Choristodera. They resembled modern crocodilians, especially gharials. The skull of these animals have a long, thin snout filled with small, sharp conical teeth. Other choristoderes are referred to collectively as "non-neochoristoderes", which are mostly small lizard-like forms, though Shokawa, Khurendukhosaurus and Hyphalosaurus possess long plesiosaur like necks, convergently closely resembling pachypleurosaurs, an extinct group of Triassic marine reptiles. "Non-neochoristoderes" are paraphyletic (not containing all descendants of a common ancestor), as the lizard-like bodyform represents the ancestral morphology of the group.

=== Skeletal anatomy ===
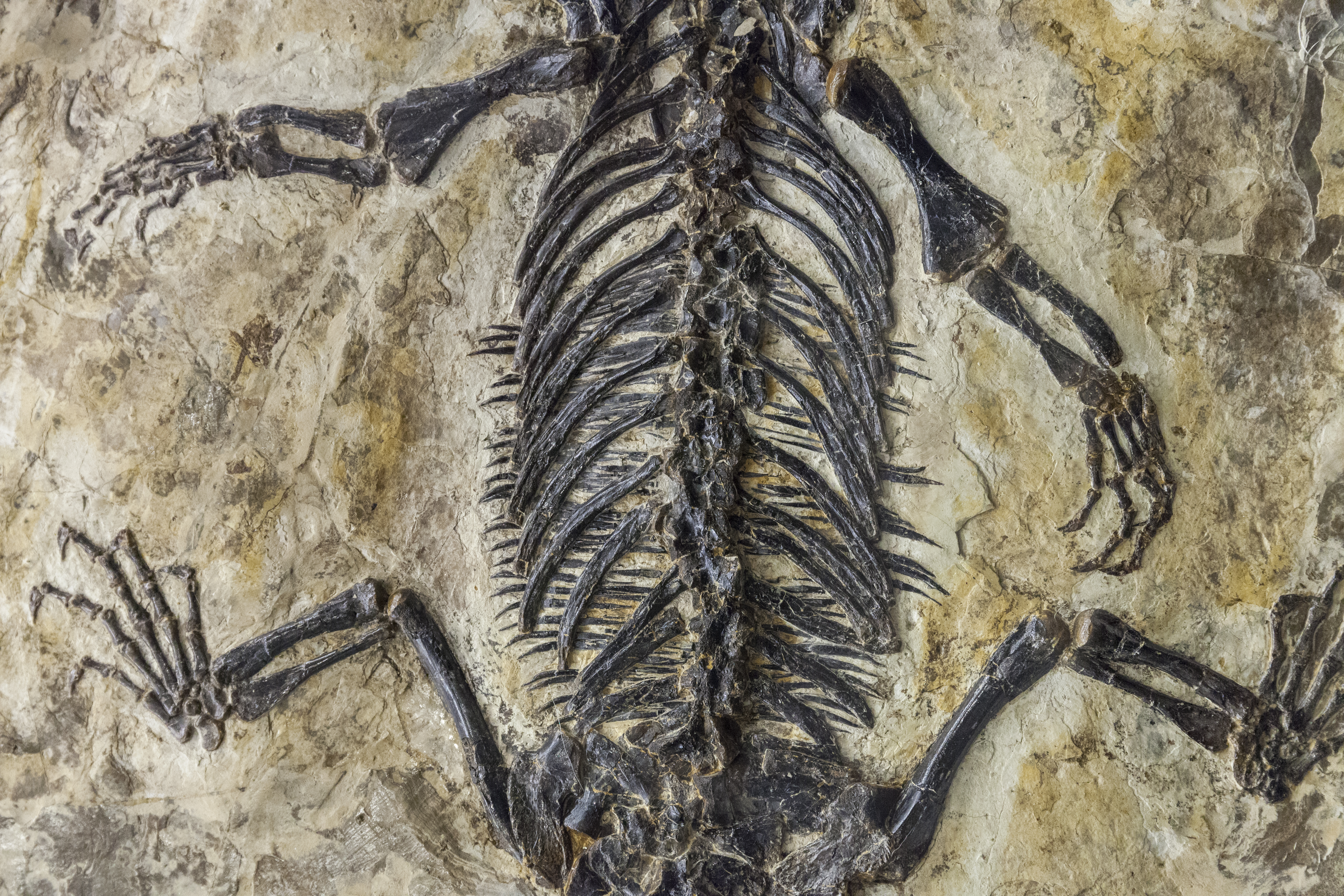
Closeup of the trunk of Ikechosaurus, showing the gastralia under the ribs

Holotype of Meilynodraco, a small, lizard-like early branching choristodere

According to Matsumoto and colleagues (2019), choristoderes are united by the presence of nine synapomorphies (shared traits characteristic of the group), including a median contact of the elongated prefrontal bones of the skull separating the nasal bones from the frontal bones, the dorsal flange of the maxilla is inflected medially (toward the midline of the body), the parietal foramen are absent, the squamosal bones are expanded behind (posterior to) the occipital condyle, the teeth are conical and sub-thecodont (located in shallow sockets), the dentaries are slender with elongated grooves running along the labial (outward facing) surface of the bone, additional sacral vertebrae are present (3, as opposed to the 2 ancestrally present in neodiapsids), expanded "spine tables" are present on the vertebrae, and the surfaces of both ends of vertebral centra are flat (amphiplatyan). All known choristoderans possess or are inferred to possess a novel skull bone not found in other reptiles, referred to as the "neomorphic bone" or neomorph, which is a component of the dermatocranium. Ancestrally, the skull of choristoderes possess elongated upper and lower temporal fenestrae (openings of the skull behind the eye socket), these are greatly expanded in neochoristoderes, most extremely in Champsosaurus, giving the skull a cordiform (heart shaped) appearance when viewed from above. In many "non-neochoristoderes" the lower temporal fenestrae are secondarily closed. Choristoderes possessed gastralia (rib-like bones situated in the abdomen) like tuatara and crocodilians.

Choristodere skull diagrams
Skull diagram of Champsosaurus lindoei, a neochoristodere

Skull of Lazarussuchus, an allochoristodere

==== Internal skull anatomy ====
The internal skull anatomy of choristoderes is only known for Champsosaurus. The braincase of Champsosaurus is poorly ossified at the front of the skull (anterior), but is well ossified in the rear (posterior) similar to other diapsids. The cranial endocast (space occupied by the brain in the cranial vault) is proportionally narrow in both lateral and dorsoventral axes, with an enlarged pineal body and olfactory bulbs. The optic lobes and flocculi are small in size, indicating only average vision ability at best. The olfactory chambers of the nasal passages and olfactory stalks of the braincase are reasonably large, indicating that Champsosaurus probably had good olfactory capabilities (sense of smell). The nasal passages lack bony turbinates. The semicircular canals of the inner ear are most similar to those of other aquatic reptiles. The expansion of the sacculus indicates that Champsosaurus likely had an increased sensitivity to low frequency sounds and vibrations.

==== Dentition ====
Most choristoderes have rather simple undifferentiated (homodont) teeth, with striated enamel covering the tooth crown but not the base. Neochoristoderes have teeth completely enveloped in striated enamel with an enamel infolding at the base, labiolingually compressed and hooked, the exception being Ikechosaurus which has still rather simple teeth aside from the start of an enamel infolding. Teeth implantation is subthecodont, with teeth being replaced by erosion of a pit in the lingual (side of the tooth facing the tongue) surface of the tooth base. There is some tooth differentiation among neochoristoderes, with the anterior teeth being sharper and more slender than posterior teeth. Choristoderes retain palatal teeth (teeth present on the bones of the roof of the mouth). Unlike most diapsid groups, where palatal teeth are reduced or lost completely, the palatal teeth in choristoderes are extensively developed indicating food manipulation in the mouth, probably in combination with the tongue. In most choristoderes, longitudinal rows of palatal teeth are present on the pterygoid, palatine and vomer, as well as a row on the pterygoid flange. In some neochoristoderes the palatal tooth rows are modified into tooth batteries on raised platforms. The morphology of the palatal teeth is identical to that of the marginal teeth of non-neochoristoderes, and the replacement of palatal teeth is nearly identical to the replacement of marginal teeth.

=== Skin ===
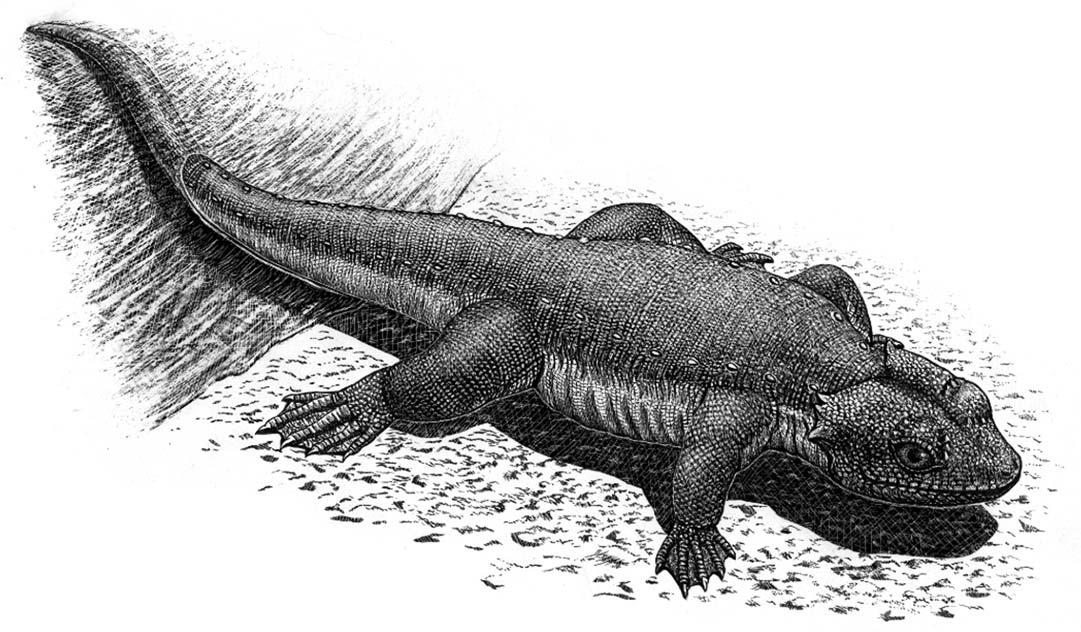
Life restoration of Monjurosuchus (Allochoristodera)

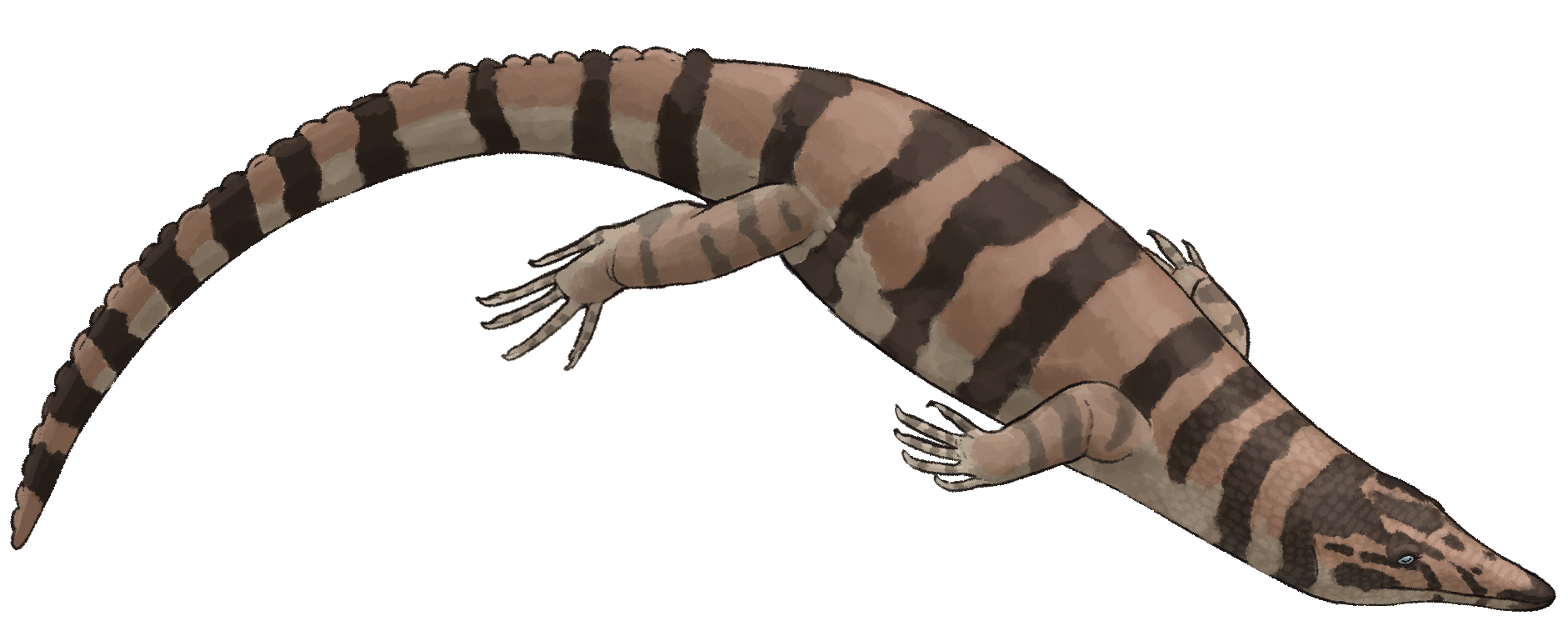
Life restoration of Lazarussuchus (Allochoristodera)

An exceptionally preserved specimen of Monjurosuchus preserves pleated skin, which indicates that in life it was probably thin and soft. The preserved scales are small and overlapping, and are smaller on the ventral underside of the body than the dorsal surface. A double row of larger ovoid scales runs along the dorsum (upper midline) of the body. The fossil also preserves webbed feet. Hyphalosaurus was covered in scales of varying shape, depending on their position on the body, with at least one and possibly multiple rows of large ovoid scales running down sides of the trunk and tail. The feet display evidence of webbing, and the tail probably had additional tissue at the top and bottom, allowing it to be used as a fin to propel Hyphalosaurus through the water. Skin impressions of Champsosaurus have also been reported, they consist of small (0.6-0.1 mm) pustulate and rhomboid scales, with the largest scales being located on the lateral sides of the body, decreasing in size dorsally, no osteoderms were present. The Menat specimen of Lazarussuchus preserves some remnants of soft tissue, but no scales, which shows that the hindfoot (pes) was not webbed, and a dark stained region with a crenellated edge is present above the caudal vertebrae of the tail, suggestive of a crest similar to those found in some living reptiles, like the tuatara, lizards and crocodiles.

== Paleobiology ==
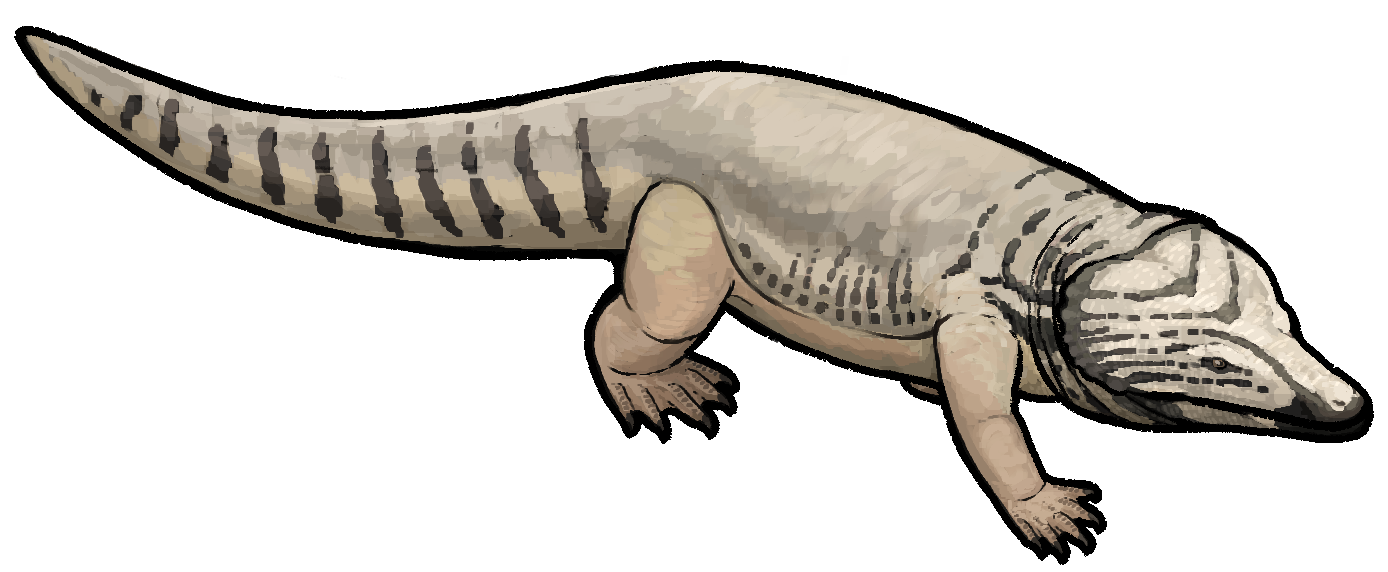
Life restoration of Kosmodraco magnicornis (Neochoristodera)

Choristoderes are exclusively found in freshwater deposits, often associated with turtles, fish, frogs, salamanders and crocodyliformes. They appear to have been almost exclusively found in warm temperate climates, with the range of neochoristoderes extending to the high Canadian Arctic during the Coniacian-Santonian stages of the Late Cretaceous (~89-83 Million years ago), a time of extreme warmth. Due to the morphological similarities between choristoderes and crocodyliformes, it has often been assumed that they existed in competition. However "non-neochoristoderes" were smaller than adult aquatic crocodyliformes and were more likely in competition with other taxa. For the more crocodile-like neochoristoderes, there appears to have been niche differentiation, with gharial-like neochoristoderans occurring in association with blunt snouted crocodyliformes, but not in association with narrow snouted forms.

=== Diet ===
Neochoristoderans are presumed to have been piscivorous. Champsosaurus in particular is thought to have fed like modern gharials, sweeping its head to the side to catch individual fish from shoals, while Simoedosaurus is thought to have been more generalist, being able to take both aquatic and terrestrial prey. Cteniogenys and Lazarussuchus have been suggested to have fed on invertebrates. Preserved gut contents of a Monjurosuchus specimen appear to show arthropod cuticle fragments. Another specimen of Monjurosuchus has been found with preserved skulls of seven juvenile individuals within the abdominal cavity. This has been proposed to represent evidence of cannibalism. However, this proposal has been criticised by other authors, who suggest it is more likely that they represent late-stage embryos. A specimen of Hyphalosaurus has been found with small rib bones in its abdominal cavity, suggesting that it took vertebrate prey, likely including small fish such as Lycoptera, at least on occasion.

=== Reproduction ===
A specimen of Hyphalosaurus baitaigouensis has been found with 18 fully developed embryos within the mother's body, suggesting that they were viviparous, but another specimen shows that Hyphalosaurus baitaigouensis also possessed soft-shelled eggs, similar to those of lepidosaurs. A possible explanation for this is that Hyphalosaurus was ovoviviparous, with the thin-shelled eggs hatching immediately after they were laid, presumably on land, though it has also been suggested that the species employed both viviparous and oviparous reproductive modes. An embryo of Ikechosaurus has been found preserved within a weakly mineralised parchment-shelled egg, suggesting that Ikechosaurus was oviparous, and laid their eggs on land. Monjuruosuchus has been suggested to have been viviparous. In Champsosaurus, it has been suggested that adult females could crawl ashore to lay eggs on land, with males and juveniles appearing to be incapable of doing so, based on the presumably sexually dimorphic fusion of the sacral vertebrae and possession of more robust limb bones in presumed females. A skeleton of Philydrosaurus has been found with associated post-hatchling stage juveniles, suggesting that they engaged in post-hatching parental care.

=== Tracks ===
Tracks from the Lower Cretaceous (Albian) Daegu Formation of South Korea, given the ichnotaxon name Novapes ulsanensis have been attributed to choristoderans, based on the similarity of the pentadactyl (five fingered) preserved tracks to the foot morphology of Monjurosuchus. The tracks preserve traces of webbing between the digits. The authors of the study proposed based on the spacing of the prints, that choristoderans could "high walk" like modern crocodilians. Tracks attributed to neochoristoderans dubbed Champsosaurichnus parfeti have also been reported from the Late Cretaceous Laramie Formation of the United States, though only two prints are present and it is not possible to distinguish between a manus (forefoot) or pes (hindfoot).

== Classification and phylogeny ==
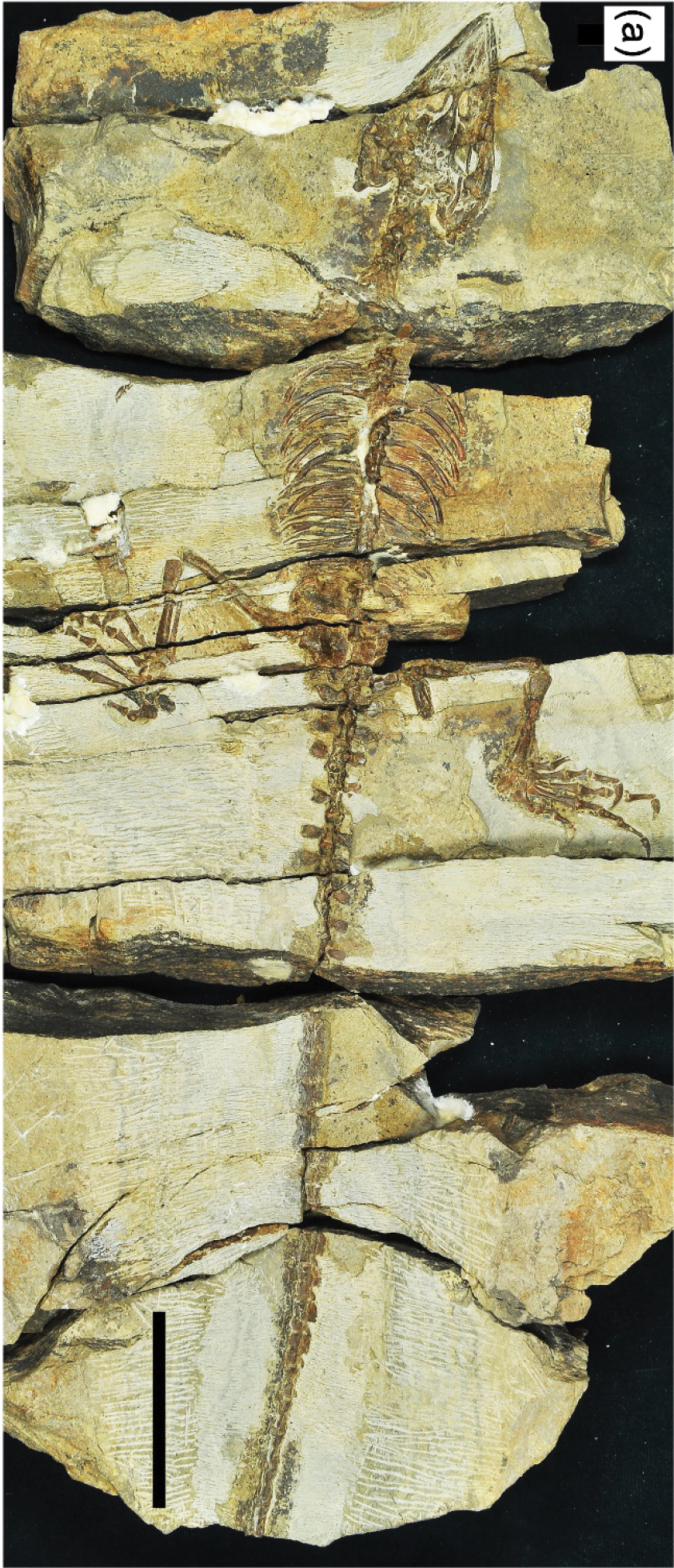
Skeleton of Coeruleodraco, an early branching small lizard-like choristodere from the Late Jurassic of China

=== Internal systematics ===
Historically, the internal phylogenetics of Choristodera were unclear, with the neochoristoderes being recovered as a well-supported clade, but the relationships of the "non-neochoristoderes" being poorly resolved. However, during the 2010s, the "non-neochoristoderes" from the Early Cretaceous of Asia (with the exception of Heishanosaurus) alongside Lazarussuchus from the Cenozoic of Europe were recovered (with weak support) as belonging to a monophyletic clade, which were informally named the "Allochoristoderes" by Dong and colleagues in 2020, characterised by the shared trait of completely closed lower temporal fenestrae, with Cteniogenys from the Middle-Late Jurassic of Europe and North America being consistently recovered as the basalmost choristodere. The long necked "non-neochoristoderes" Shokawa and Hyphalosaurus have often been recovered as a clade, dubbed the Hyphalosauridae by Gao and Fox in 2005. The finding of more complete material of the previously fragmentary Khurendukhosaurus shows that it also has a long neck, and it has also been recovered as part of the clade.

Choristodera is a node-based taxon, defined as "the least inclusive clade including Meilynodraco, Heishanosaurus, Cteniogenys, Lazarussuchus and Champsosaurus, and all its descendants." This definition was proposed by Scheyer et al. in their 2026 description of the early-diverging choristodere Meilynodraco, which incorporated an updated and expanded version of the phylogenetic matrix used by previous researchers to assess the interrelationships of choristoderes. These results are displayed in the cladogram below.

- †Choristodera
  - Heishanosaurus pygmaeus
  - Meilynodraco amonamarthi
  - - Coeruleodraco jurassicus
    - Allochoristodera
      - Monjurosuchus splendens
      - Philydrosaurus proseilus
      - - - Lazarussuchus dvoraki
          - Lazarussuchus inexpectatus
          - Lazarussuchus sp.
        - - Hyphalosaurus lingyuanensis
          - Khurendukhosaurus spp.
          - Shokawa ikoi
    - - Cteniogenys antiquus
      - Neochoristodera
        - Ikechosaurus pijiagouensis
        - Ikechosaurus sunailinae
        - Tchoiria klauseni
        - Tchoiria namsari
        - - Simoedosaurus lemoinei
          - - Kosmodraco dakotensis
            - Kosmodraco magnicornis
        - Champsosaurus norelli
        - - Champsosaurus albertensis
          - Champsosaurus gigas
          - - Champsosaurus lindoei
            - - Champsosaurus laramiensis
              - Champsosaurus natator

=== Relationships to other reptiles ===
Choristoderes are agreed to be members of Neodiapsida, but their exact placement in the clade is uncertain, due to their mix of primitive and derived features, and an assumed long ghost lineage (absence of a fossil record) after their split from other reptiles. After initially being placed in Rhynchocephalia, Cope later suggested a placement in Lacertilla due to the shape of the cervical vertebrae. Louis Dollo in 1891 returned Choristodera to Rhynchocephalia, but in 1893 suggested a close relationship with Pareiasaurus. Alfred Romer in publications in 1956 and 1968 placed Choristodera within the paraphyletic or polyphyletic grouping of "Eosuchia", describing them, as "an offshoot of the basic eosuchian stock", a classification which was widely accepted. However, the use of computer based cladistics in the 1980s demonstrated the non-monophyly of "Eosuchia", making the classification of choristoderes again uncertain. Subsequent studies either suggested placement as archosauromorphs (the group which includes crocodilians, birds and their extinct relatives), lepidosauromorphs (which includes lizards, snakes and the tuatara) or members of Diapsida incertae sedis. In a 2016 analysis of neodiapsid relationships by Martín Ezcurra they were recovered as members of the advanced neodiapsid group Sauria (the least inclusive group containing the ancestors of living reptiles, birds and all their descendants), in a polytomy with Lepidosauromorpha and Archosauromorpha, with a placement as the earliest diverging member of either group also being plausible. A position as basal archosauromorphs is supported by the ossification sequence of their embryos. The morphology of the prootic bone of the early diverging Meilynodraco supports a placement within Sauria as opposed to a more basal position within Neodiapsida, suggesting the non-saurian neodiapsid-like prootic of Champsosaurus is a derived trait and not representative of the ancestral choristoderan condition. A placement within Archosauromorpha—tentatively allied with the marine reptile clade Sauropterygia—was supported by Scheyer et al. (2026), though they admitted that the placement was tentative as the analysis was primarily designed to test internal choristodere relationships and had relatively few outgroups.

== Evolutionary history ==
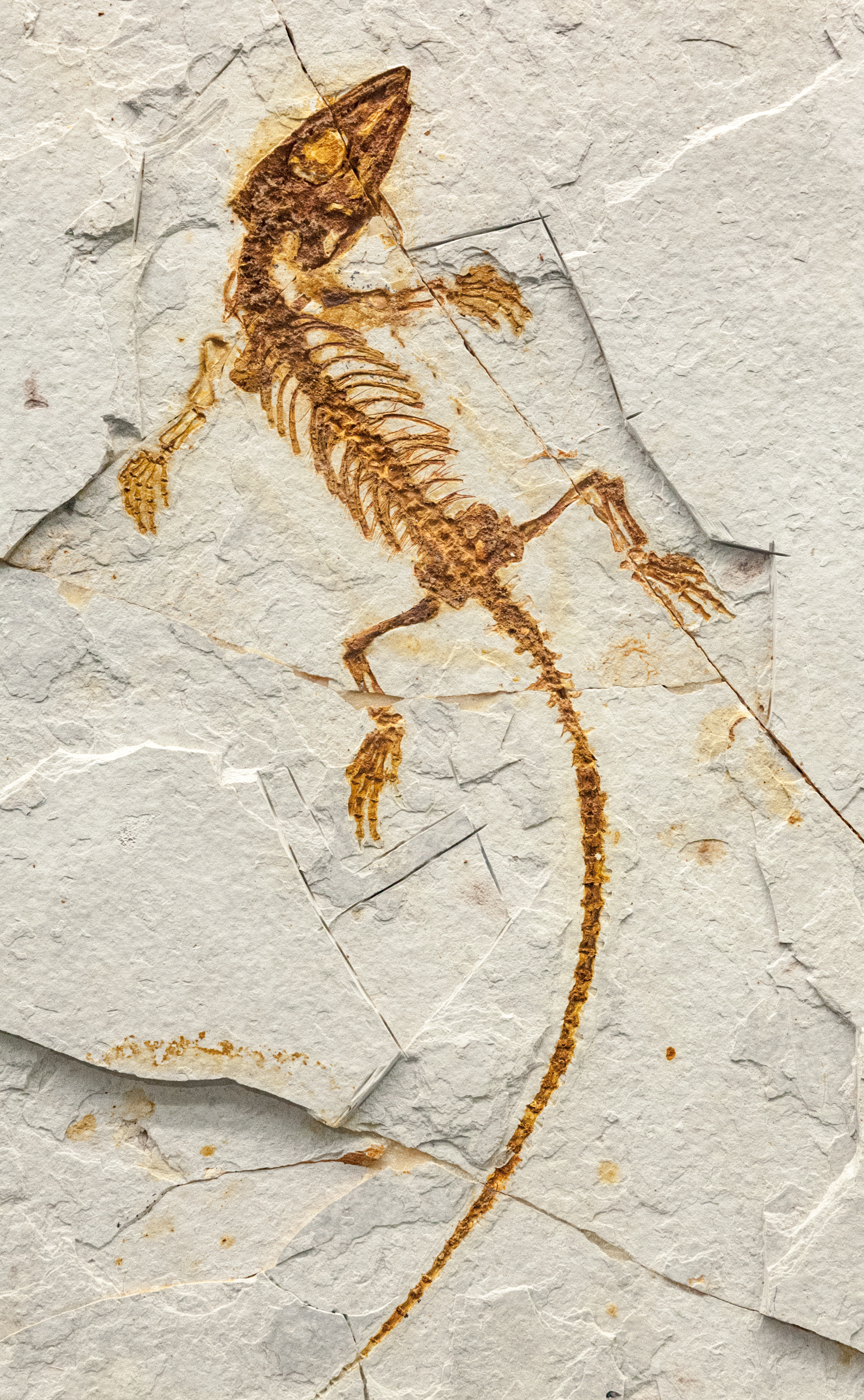
Skeleton of Monjurosuchus

Choristoderes must have diverged from all other known reptile groups prior to the end of the Permian period, over 250 million years ago, based on their primitive phylogenetic position. Pachystropheus from the Late Triassic (Rhaetian) of Britain was historically suggested to be a choristodere, but was later demonstrated to be a member of the marine reptile group Thalattosauria. Possible choristodere remains have also been reported from the Middle Triassic (Ladinian) Erfurt Formation of Germany. However, these remains were suggested to choristoderes based on their similarity of those of Pachystropheus, and may also represent the remains of thalattosaurs. The enigmatic Elachistosuchus from the Late Triassic of Germany has been suggested as a choristodere-relative, but phylogenetic analyses have found the evidence in favour of this hypothesis equivocal. The oldest unequivocal choristoderan is the small lizard-like Cteniogenys, the oldest known remains of which are known from the late Middle Jurassic (Bathonian ~168-166 million years ago) Forest Marble and Kilmaluag formations of Britain, with remains also known from the Upper Jurassic Alcobaça Formation of Portugal and the Morrison Formation of the United States, with broadly similar remains also known from the late Middle Jurassic (Callovian) Balabansai Formation of Kyrgyzstan in Central Asia, the Bathonian Itat Formation of western Siberia, as well as possibly the Bathonian aged Anoual Formation in Morocco, North Africa.

Choristoderes underwent a major evolutionary radiation in Asia during the Early Cretaceous, which represents the high point of choristoderan diversity, including the first records of the gharial-like Neochoristodera, which appear to have evolved in the regional absence of aquatic neosuchian crocodyliformes. A partial femur of an indeterminate choristodere is known from the Yellow Cat Member of the Cedar Mountain Formation in North America. They appear to be absent from the well sampled European localities of the Berriasian aged Purbeck Group, Great Britain and the Barremian aged La Huérguina Formation, Spain, though there is a record of a small Cteniogenys-like taxon from the Berriasian aged Angeac-Charente bonebed in France. In the latter half of the Late Cretaceous (Campanian-Maastrichtian), the neochoristodere Champsosaurus is found in Utah, Wyoming, Montana, North Dakota, Alberta and Saskatchewan, which were along the western coast of the Western Interior Seaway on the island of Laramidia. Indeterminate remains of neochoristoderes are also known from the Canadian High Arctic, dating to the early Late Cretaceous (Coniacian–Turonian) and from the Navesink Formation of New Jersey from the latest Cretaceous (Maastrichtian), which formed the separate island of Appalachia. Vertebrae from the Cenomanian of Germany and the Campanian aged Grünbach Formation of Austria indicate the presence of choristoderes in Europe during this time period. The only record of choristoderes from Asia in the Late Cretaceous is a single vertebra from the Turonian of Japan. Fragmentary remains found in the Campanian aged Oldman and Dinosaur Park formations in Alberta, Canada, also possibly suggest the presence of small bodied "non-neochoristoderes" in North America during the Late Cretaceous.

Champsosaurus survived the K-Pg extinction, and together with fellow neochoristoderes Kosmodraco and Simoedosaurus are present in Europe, Asia and North America during the Paleocene, however they became extinct during the early Eocene. Their extinction coincides with major faunal turnover associated with the elevated temperatures of the Paleocene–Eocene Thermal Maximum. Small bodied "non-neochoristoderes", which are absent from the fossil record after the Early Cretaceous (except for possible North American remains), reappear in the form of the lizard-like Lazarussuchus from the late Paleocene of France. The European endemic Lazarussuchus is the last known choristodere, surviving the extinction of neochoristoderes at the beginning of the Eocene, with the youngest known remains being those of L. dvoraki from the Early Miocene of the Czech Republic and as well as possible indeterminate remains of Lazarussuchus reported from the late Miocene (~11.6 million years ago) of southern Germany.
