= Sangyuan =

Sangyuan (simplified Chinese: 桑园; traditional Chinese: 桑園; pinyin: Sāngyuán) could refer to the following towns in China:

- Sangyuan, Huailai County, in Huailai County, Hebei
- Sangyuan, Baoding, in Li County, Hebei
- Sangyuan, Wuqiao County, in Wuqiao County, Hebei
- Sangyuan, Shaanxi, in Xixiang County, Shaanxi
- Sangyuan, Shandong, in Ju County, Shandong
- Sangyuan, Sichuan, in Qionglai, Sichuan

== See also ==
- Shangyuan (disambiguation)
