= Shangyuan =

Shangyuan may refer to:

- Shangyuan Festival, also known as the Lantern Festival in English
- Shangyuan railway station, a railway station on the Taiwan Railways Administration Neiwan Line

== Places in China ==
- Shangyuan, Beipiao (上园), a town in Beipiao, Liaoning
- Shangyuan Subdistrict (上园街道), a subdistrict in Dadong District, Shenyang, Liaoning

== Historical eras ==
- Shangyuan (上元, 674–676), era name used by Emperor Gaozong of Tang
- Shangyuan (上元, 760–761), era name used by Emperor Suzong of Tang

== See also ==
- Sangyuan (disambiguation)
