= Yangavis =

Yangavis Temporal range: Early Cretaceous, Aptian

Scientific classification
- Domain: Eukaryota
- Kingdom: Animalia
- Phylum: Chordata
- Clade: Dinosauria
- Clade: Saurischia
- Clade: Theropoda
- Clade: Avialae
- Family: †Confuciusornithidae
- Genus: †Yangavis; Wang & Zhou, 2018

Type species
- †Yangavis confucii Wang & Zhou, 2018

Extinct genus of birds

Yangavis is a basal pygostylian genus, belonging to the Confuciusornithidae, that in the Early Cretaceous lived in the area of present China. The type species is Yangavis confucii.

== Discovery and naming ==
At Sihedang, in Liaoning, a fossil avialan skeleton was excavated. In 2018, the type species Yangavis confucii was named and described by Wang Min and Zhou Zhonghe. The generic name honours the Chinese paleontologist Yang Zhongjian on the occasion of his 121st birthday, connecting his name with a Latin avis, "bird". The specific name honours Confucius, at the same time referring to the Confuciusornithidae.

The holotype, IVPP V18929, was found in a layer of the Yixian Formation dating from the Aptian. It consists of an almost complete articulated skeleton, compressed on a single plate.

== Description ==
Yangavis has a wingspan of about half a metre. It differs from all other known Confuciusornithidae in several autapomorphies. The dorsal branch of the maxilla is rectangular and has a ridge on the outer side obliquely running from the lower front to the upper rear. The claw of the second finger is not strongly reduced. The claw of the first toe is as large as the second and fourth claws, instead of being the smallest. The third toe is longer than the tarsometatarsus.

== Phylogeny ==
Yangavis was placed in the Confuciusornithidae, above the more basal Eoconfuciusornis and below the more derived Changchengornis in the evolutionary tree. If so, it secondarily lost the trait of a reduced second hand claw, the ecological function of which is unknown.
