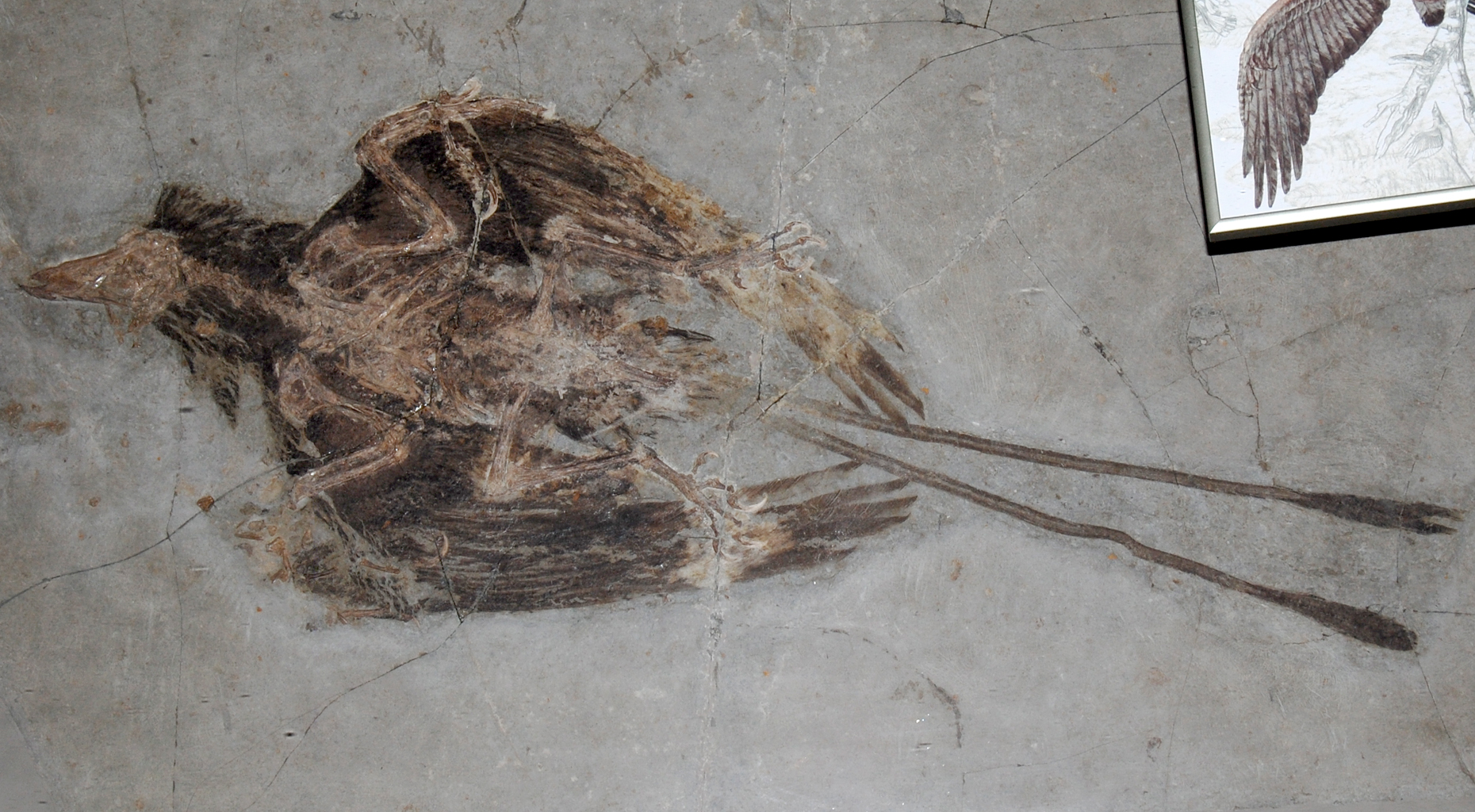
- C. sanctus fossil preserving long wing and tail feathers, Natural History Museum, Vienna

Scientific classification
- Kingdom: Animalia
- Phylum: Chordata
- Class: Reptilia
- Clade: Dinosauria
- Clade: Saurischia
- Clade: Theropoda
- Clade: Avialae
- Family: †Confuciusornithidae
- Genus: †Confuciusornis; Hou et al., 1995

Type species
- †Confuciusornis sanctus Hou et al., 1995

Other species
- †C. dui Hou et al., 1999; †C. feducciai Zhang et al., 2009; †C. jianchangensis Li et al., 2010; †C. shifan Wang et al., 2022

Synonyms
- Genus synonymy: Jinzhouornis Hou et al. 2002; Species synonymy (C. sanctus): C. suniae Hou, 1997; C. chuonzhous Hou 1997; Jinzhouornis yixianensis Hou et al., 2002; Jinzhouornis zhangjiyingia Hou et al., 2002

= Confuciusornis =

Confuciusornis Temporal range: Early Cretaceous, 125–120 Ma

Extinct genus of birds

Confuciusornis is a genus of basal crow-sized avialan confuciusornithid theropod dinosaur from the Early Cretaceous Period of the Yixian and Jiufotang Formations of China, dating from 125 to 120 million years ago. Like modern birds, Confuciusornis had a toothless beak, but closer and later relatives of modern birds such as Hesperornis and Ichthyornis were toothed, indicating that the loss of teeth occurred convergently in Confuciusornis and living birds. It was thought to be the oldest known bird to have a beak, though this title now belongs to an earlier relative Eoconfuciusornis. It was named after the Chinese moral philosopher Confucius (551–479 BC). Confuciusornis is one of the most abundant vertebrates found in the Yixian Formation, and several hundred complete specimens have been found.

== History of discovery ==
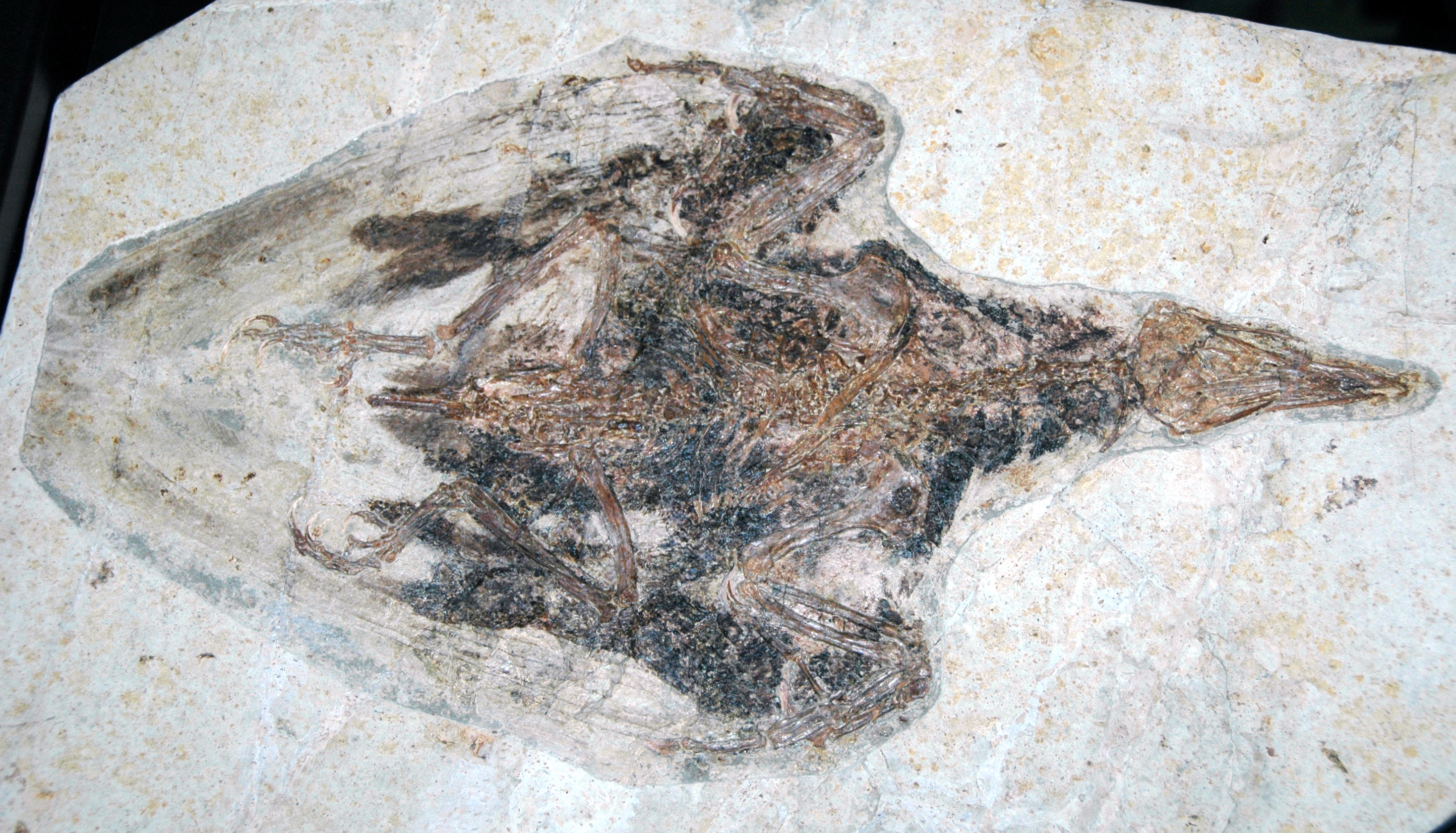
C. sanctus specimen, Cincinnati Museum of Natural History and Science; specimens have been distributed worldwide

In November 1993, the Chinese paleontologists Hou Lianhai and Hu Yoaming of the Institute of Vertebrate Paleontology and Paleoanthropology (IVPP) at Beijing, visited fossil collector Zhang He at his home in Jinzhou, where he showed them a fossil bird specimen that he had bought at a local flea market. In December, Hou learned about a second specimen, which had been discovered by a farmer named Yang Yushan. Both specimens were found in the same locality in Shangyuan, Beipiao. In 1995, these two specimens, as well as a third one, were formally described as a new genus and species of bird, Confuciusornis sanctus, by Hou and colleagues. The generic name combines the philosopher Confucius with Greek ὄρνις (ornis), "bird". The specific name means "holy one" in Latin and is a translation of Chinese 圣贤 (shèngxián), "sage", again in reference to Confucius. The first discovered specimen was designated the holotype and catalogued under the specimen number IVPP V10918; it comprises a partial skeleton with skull and parts of the forelimb. Of the other two skeletons, one (paratype, IVPP V10895) comprises a complete pelvis and hind limb, and the other (paratype, IVPP V10919–10925) a fragmentary hind limb together with six feather impressions attached to both sides of the tibia (shin bone). It was soon noted that the two paratype specimens only comprise bones that are unknown from the holotype, and that this lack of overlap makes their referral to the species speculative. Only the discovery of a great number of well-preserved specimens shortly after had confirmed that the specimens indeed represent a single species.

Together with the early mammal Zhangheotherium, which was discovered at around the same time, Confuciusornis was considered to be the most remarkable fossil discovery of the Jehol Biota, which in the next decades would reveal the most important record of Mesozoic birds worldwide. In the late 1990s, Confuciusornis was thought to be both the oldest beaked bird as well as the earliest bird after Archaeopteryx. It was also considered to be only slightly younger than Archaeopteryx – the Yixian Formation, the rock unit where most Confuciusornis specimens have been found, was thought to be of Late Jurassic (Tithonian) age at the time. Although two bird genera, Sinornis and Cathayornis, had already described from the Jehol biota in 1992, these were only based on fragmentary remains and stem from the younger Jiufotang Formation, which was considered to be of Early Cretaceous age. Later, both formations have been dated to the Lower Cretaceous (Barremian to Aptian stages, 131–120 million years ago).

In 1995, local farmers began digging for fossils near the village of Sihetun, Beipiao, in what would become one of the most productive localities of the Jehol biota. Large-scale professional excavations at this single locality have been carried out by the IVPP from 1997 onwards; recovered fossils include several hundred specimens of Confuciusornis. Many additional sites producing fossils of the Jehol biota have been recognized since, distributed over a large region including Liaoning, Hebei, and Inner Mongolia. Due to the great abundance, preservation, and commercial value of the fossils, excavations by local farmers produced an unusually high number of fossils. Although a portion of these fossils have been added to the collections of Chinese research institutions, more have probably been smuggled out of the country. In 1999, it was estimated that the National Geological Museum of China in Beijing housed nearly 100 specimens of Confuciusornis, and in 2010, the Shandong Tianyu Museum of Nature was reported to possess 536 specimens of the bird. The majority of specimens, however, are held privately and thus are not available for research.

At one time forty individuals were discovered on a surface of about 100 m^{2}. This has been explained as the result of entire flocks of birds being simultaneously killed by ash, heat or poisonous gas following the volcanic eruptions that caused the tuff stone in which the fossils were found to be deposited as lake sediments.

=== Additional species and synonyms ===
Since the description of Confuciusornis sanctus, five additional species have been formally named and described. As with many other fossil genera, species are difficult to define, as differences between species can often not be readily distinguished from variation that occurs within a species. In the case of Confuciusornis, only C. sanctus is universally accepted.

- Confuciusornis chuonzhous was named by Hou in 1997 based on specimen IVPP V10919, originally a paratype of C. sanctus. The specific name refers to Chuanzhou, an ancient name for Beipiao. C. chuonzhous is now generally considered synonymous with C. sanctus.
- Confuciusornis suniae, named by Hou in the same 1997 publication, was based on specimen IVPP V11308. The specific name honours madam Sun, the wife of Shikuan Liang who donated the fossil to the IVPP. C. suniae is now usually considered synonymous with C. sanctus.
- Confuciusornis dui was named by Hou and colleagues in 1999. The specific name again honours the donating collector, Du Wengya. The holotype specimen (IVPP V11553) is a nearly complete skeleton of an adult that includes a pair of long tail feathers and the impression of the horny beak. A second specimen, the paratype IVPP 11521, is fragmentary and includes some vertebrae and ribs, tail, sternum and pelvis, and femora. According to Hou and colleagues, C. dui was smaller and more gracile than most other Confuciusornis specimens, with the holotype being ca. 15% smaller than the holotype of C. sanctus and ca. 30% smaller than larger individuals of that species. The jaw tips were more pointed than in C. sanctus, and the mandible lacked the underside keel that is distinct in the latter species. Further differences to the type species can be found in the postcranium: The claw on the first digit was not enlarged as in C. sanctus. The sternum was more elongate and differed in anatomical details, and the lower segment of the hind limb (the tarsometatarsus) was shorter than the pygostyle of the tail. A statistical analysis by Marguán-Lobon and colleagues in 2011 revealed no significant differences to specimens referred to the smallest size class of C. sanctus, suggesting that the supposed differences are individual variations of a single species. However, these authors could not re-locate the C. dui holotype, which is possibly lost, and therefore had to rely on a cast of that specimen for their measurements. A re-study of the C. dui specimens would be required in order to evaluate the validity of the species.
- Confuciusornis feducciai was named in 2009 by Zhang Fucheng and colleagues, the specific name honouring ornithologist Alan Feduccia. The holotype, D2454, was discovered at the Sihetun locality and is kept at the Dalian Natural Museum. According to Zhang and colleagues, C. feducciai differed from other Confuciusornis species in its larger size, skeletal proportions, and a number of morphological features. The forelimb was 15% longer than the hind limb, while they were of equal length in C. sanctus. The upper end of the humerus lacked the large opening (foramen) that is characteristic for other Confuciusornis specimens. The first phalanx of the first digit was more slender. Other differences occur in the furcula, which was V-shaped; the sternum, which was broader than long; and the ischium, which was long compared to the pubis. Marguán-Lobon and colleagues, in 2011, argued that this diagnosis is problematic. The large opening in the humerus, although apparently absent in the left humerus, was clearly present in the right humerus of the holotype. Furthermore, their statistical analysis found the specimen to fall well within the continuum of variation of C. sanctus. These authors therefore proposed that C. feducciai is identical (a junior synonym) of C. sanctus.
- Confuciusornis jianchangensis was named in 2010 by Li Li and colleagues, based on specimen PMOL-AB00114 found at Toudaoyingzi. In contrast to most other species, which stem from the Yixian Formation, C. jianchangensis is found in the Jiufotang Formation.

In 2002 Hou named the genus Jinzhouornis, but Chiappe et al. (2018) and Wang et al. (2018) showed that this genus is a junior synonym of Confuciusornis based on morphometry and examination of known confuciusornithiform specimens.

== Description ==
=== Size ===
Size of C. sanctus compared to a human hand

Confuciusornis was about the size of a modern crow, with a total length of 50 centimetres (1.6 feet) and a wingspan of up to 70 cm (2.3 ft). Its body weight has been estimated to have been as much as 0.5 kilograms (1.1 lb), or as little as 0.2 kg (0.44 lb). C. feducciai was about a third longer than average specimens of C. sanctus.

=== Distinguishing traits ===
Confuciusornis shows a mix of basal and derived traits. It was more "advanced" or derived than Archaeopteryx in possessing a short tail with a pygostyle (a bone formed from a series of short, fused tail vertebrae) and a bony sternum (breastbone), but more basal or "primitive" than modern birds in retaining large claws on the forelimbs, having a primitive skull with a closed eye-socket, and a relatively small breastbone. At first the number of basal characteristics was exaggerated: Hou assumed in 1995 that a long tail was present and mistook grooves in the jaw bones for small degenerated teeth.

=== Skull ===
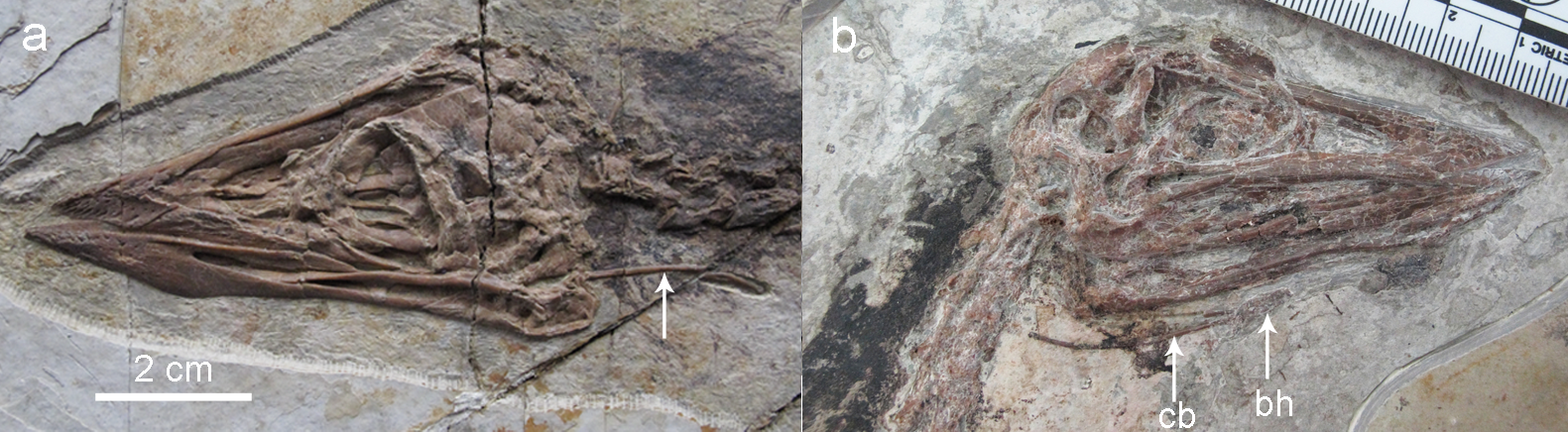
Skulls of C. sanctus and C. sp., with arrows indicating hyoid elements

The skull morphology of Confuciusornis has been difficult to determine, due to the crushed and deformed nature of the fossils. The skull was near triangular in side view, and the toothless beak was robust and pointed. The front of the jaws had deep neurovascular foramina and grooves, associated with the keratinous rhamphotheca (horn-covered beak). The skull was rather robust, with deep jaws, especially the mandible. The tomial crest of the upper jaw (a bony support for the jaw's cutting edge) was straight for its entire length. The premaxillae (front bones of the upper jaw) were fused together for most of the front half of the snout, but were separated at the tip by a V-shaped notch. The frontal processes that projected hindwards from the premaxillae were thin and extended above the orbits (eye openings) like in modern birds, but unlike Archaeopteryx and other primitive birds without pygostyles, where these processes end in front of the orbits. The maxilla (the second large bone of the upper jaw) and premaxilla articulated by an oblique suture, and the maxilla had an extensive palatal shelf. The nasal bone was smaller than in most birds, and had a slender process that directed down towards the maxilla. The orbit was large, round, and contained scleral plates (the bony support inside the eye). A crescent-shaped element that formed the front wall of the orbit may be an ethmoidolacrimal complex similar to that of pigeons, but the identity of these bones is unclear due to bad preservation, and the fact that this region is very variable in modern birds. The external nares (bony nostrils) were near triangular and positioned far from the tip of the snout. The borders of the nostrils were formed by the premaxillae above, the maxilla below, and the nasal wall at the back.

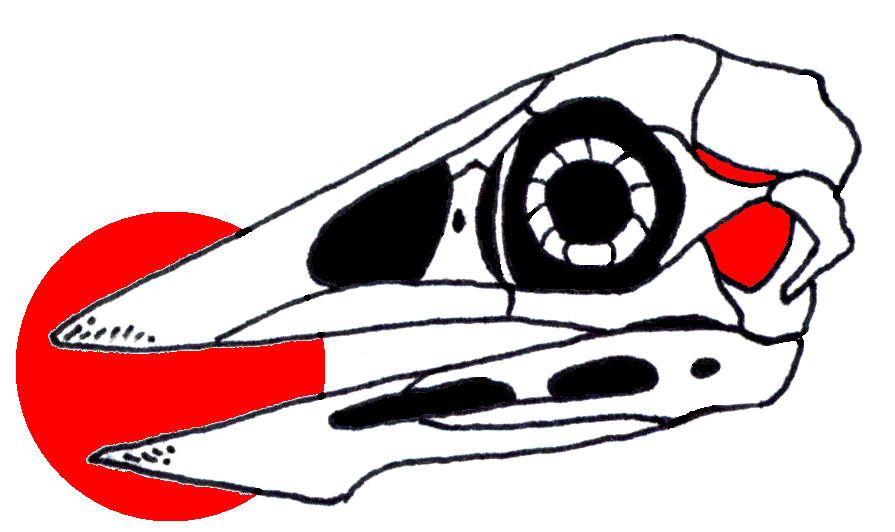
Due to the crushed nature of the specimens, the temporal region of the skull has been reconstructed in various ways, here in a diapsid configuration (right in red) suggested by Chiappe and colleagues, 1999

Few specimens preserve the sutures of the braincase, but one specimen shows that the frontoparietal suture crossed the skull just behind the postorbital process and the hindmost wall of the orbit. This was similar to Archaeopteryx and Enaliornis, whereas it curves back and crosses the skull roof much farther behind in modern birds, making the frontal bone of Confuciusornis small compared to those of modern birds. A prominent supraorbital flange formed the upper border of the orbit, and continued as the postorbital process, which had prominent crests which projected outwards to the sides, forming an expansion of the orbit's rim. The squamosal bone was fully incorporated into the braincase wall, making its exact borders impossible to determine, which is also true for adult modern birds. Various interpretations have been proposed of the morphology and identity of the bones in the temporal region behind the orbits, but it may not be resolvable with the available fossils. Confuciusornis was considered the first known bird with an ancestral diapsid skull (with two temporal fenestrae on each side of the skull) in the late 1990s, but in 2018, Elzanowski and colleagues concluded that the configuration seen in the temporal region of confuciusornithids was autapomorphic (a unique trait that evolved secondarily rather than having been retained from a primitive condition) for their group. The quadrate bone and the back end of the jugal bar were bound in a complex scaffolding that connected the squamosal bone with the lower end of the postorbital process. This scaffolding consisted of two bony bridges, the temporal bar and the orbitozygomatic junction, which gave the appearance of the temporal opening being divided similarly to diapsid skulls, though this structure is comparable to bridges over the temporary fossa in modern birds.

The mandible (lower jaw) is one of the best preserved parts of the skull. It was robust, especially at the front third of its length. The tomial crest was straight for its entire length, and a notch indented the sharp tip of the mandible. The mandible was spear-shaped in side view, due to its lower margin slanting downwards and back from its tip for the front third of its length (the jaw was also deepest at a point one third from the tip). The symphyseal part (where the two halves of the lower jaw connected) of the dentary was very robust. The lower margin formed an angle at the level of the front margin of the nasal foramen, which indicates how far back the rhamphotheca of the beak extended. The dentary had three processes that extended backwards into other bones placed further back in the mandible. The articular bone at the back of the mandible was completely fused with the surangular and prearticular bones. The mandible extended hindwards beyond the cotyla (which connected with the condyle of the upper jaw), and this part was therefore similar to a retroarticular process as seen in other taxa. The surangular enclosed two mandibular fenestrae. The hindmost part of the surangular had a small foramen placed in the same position as similar openings in the mandibles of non-bird theropods and modern birds. The splenial bone was three-pronged (as in some modern birds, but unlike the simple splenial of Archaeopteryx), and its lower margin followed the lower margin of the mandible. There was a large rostral mandibular fenestra and a small, rounded caudal fenestra behind it.

Though only five specimens preserve parts of the beak's keratinous covering, these show that there would have been differences between species not seen in the skeleton. The holotype of C. dui preserves the outline of an upwards curving beak which sharply tapers towards its tip, while a C. sanctus specimen (IVPP V12352) has an upper margin that is almost straight, and a tip that appears to be slightly hooked downwards. Two further specimens (STM13-133 and STM13-162) belonging to an indeterminate species were described in 2020; the former suggests that, unlike modern birds, the beak on both jaws was made up of two separate elements that met at the midline, with feathers growing between them on the upper jaw. Also unlike modern birds, these specimens suggest that the upper beak extended backwards onto the maxilla due to the presence of foramina.

=== Postcranial skeleton ===
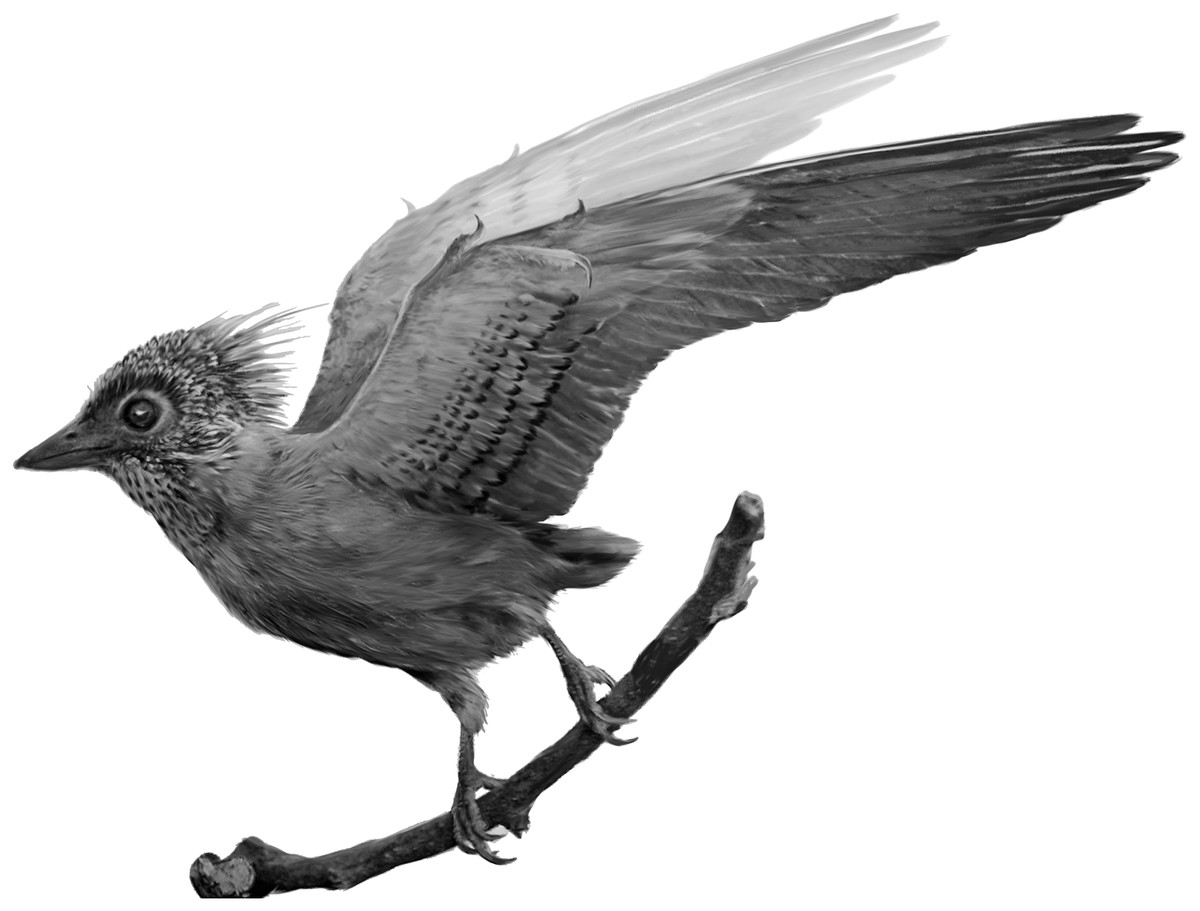
Restoration of the plumage pattern, based on specimen CUGB P1401

The various specimens seem to have a variable number of neck vertebrae, some showing eight, others nine. The first vertebra, the atlas, bore a faint keel on the underside. The next, the axis, had an expanded spinal process on the top and its side was excavated by an elongated groove in the side. The remaining neck vertebrae all had rather low spinal processes. There is no clear evidence of a pneumatisation, in the form of internal air spaces, of the vertebral bodies of the neck. The front articulation facets of the neck vertebrae were saddle-shaped. Their undersides were pinched.

There were at least twelve back vertebrae. They were amphiplatian, flat at both ends, and had rather small intervertebral foramina, the spaces between the vertebral body and the neural arch. Their spinal processes were tall and narrow in side view. Their side processes projected horizontally and were deeply excavated at the rear underside. The sides of the back vertebrae also had deep oval excavations.

Seven sacral vertebrae were fused into a synsacrum. The front sacral vertebra had a round and concave front articulation facet. The vertebral bodies of the front half of the synsacrum were excavated at their sides, comparable to the back vertebrae. Robust side processes connected the synsacrum to the ilia of the pelvis.

Although earlier descriptions had counted four or five "free", not fused, tail vertebrae, Chiappe e.a. in 1999 reported seven of them. These had round and somewhat concave front articulation facets. Their spinal processes were high and transversely compressed. The side processes were robust and stick out horizontally to the side. Their articulation processes were rather long. The last of these vertebrae had a rectangular profile. Its neural arch had short processes pointing obliquely to above and sideways. The tail ended in a pygostyle, a complete fusion of the last vertebrae. Their number is uncertain. The pygostyle was about 40% longer than the first part of the tail. At its underside the pygostyle bore a well-developed keel, running from front to rear. Its top was incised by a long groove between prominent ridges.

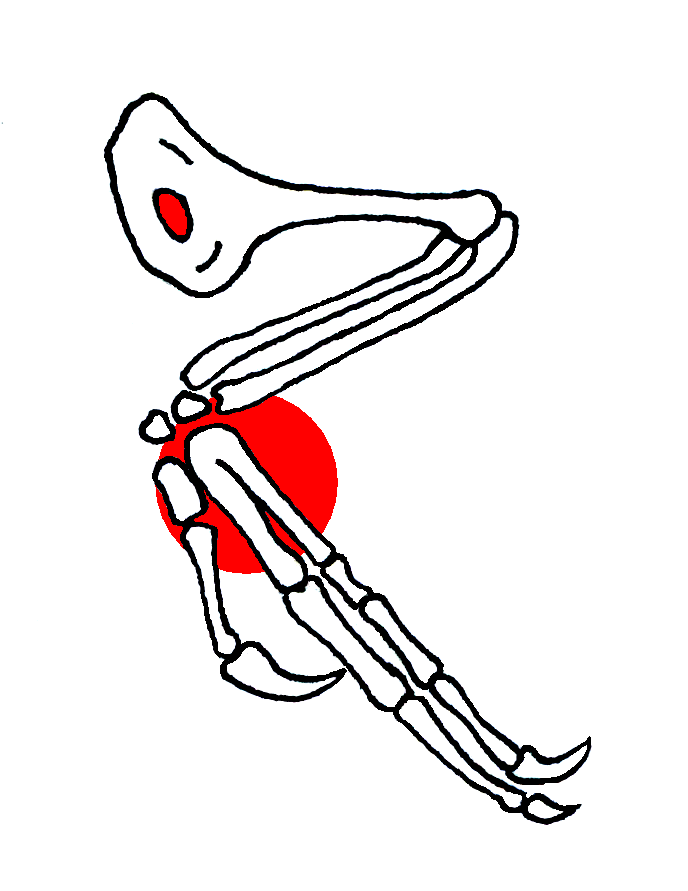
Diagram of the arm bones; note the hole in the humerus

Confuciusornis had an exceptionally large humerus (upper arm bone). Near its shoulder-end this was equipped with a prominent deltopectoral crest. Characteristically this crista deltopectoralis was with Confuciusornis pierced by an oval hole which may have reduced the bone's weight or enlarged the attachment area of the flight muscles. The furcula or wishbone, like that of Archaeopteryx, was a simple curved bar lacking a pointed process at the back, a hypocleidium. The sternum was relatively broad and had a low keel which was raised at the back end. This bony keel may or may not have anchored a larger, cartilaginous, keel for enlarged pectoral muscles. The scapulae (shoulder blades) were fused to the strut-like coracoid bones and may have formed a solid base for the attachment of wing muscles. The orientation of the shoulder joint was sideways, instead of angled upward as in modern birds; this means that Confuciusornis was unable to lift its wings high above its back. According to a study by Phil Senter in 2006, the joint was even pointed largely downwards meaning that the humerus could not be lifted above the horizontal. This would make Confuciusornis incapable of the upstroke required for flapping flight; the same would have been true for Archaeopteryx.

The wrist of Confuciusornis shows fusion, forming a carpometacarpus. The second and third metacarpals were also partially fused, but the first was unfused, and the fingers could freely move relative to each other. The second metacarpal, which supported the flight feathers, was very heavily built; its finger carries a small claw. The claw of the first finger to the contrary was very large and curved. The stub-like third metacarpal, which supported the calami of the feathers, was probably enclosed in the flesh of the hand. The formula of the finger phalanges was 2-3-4-0-0.

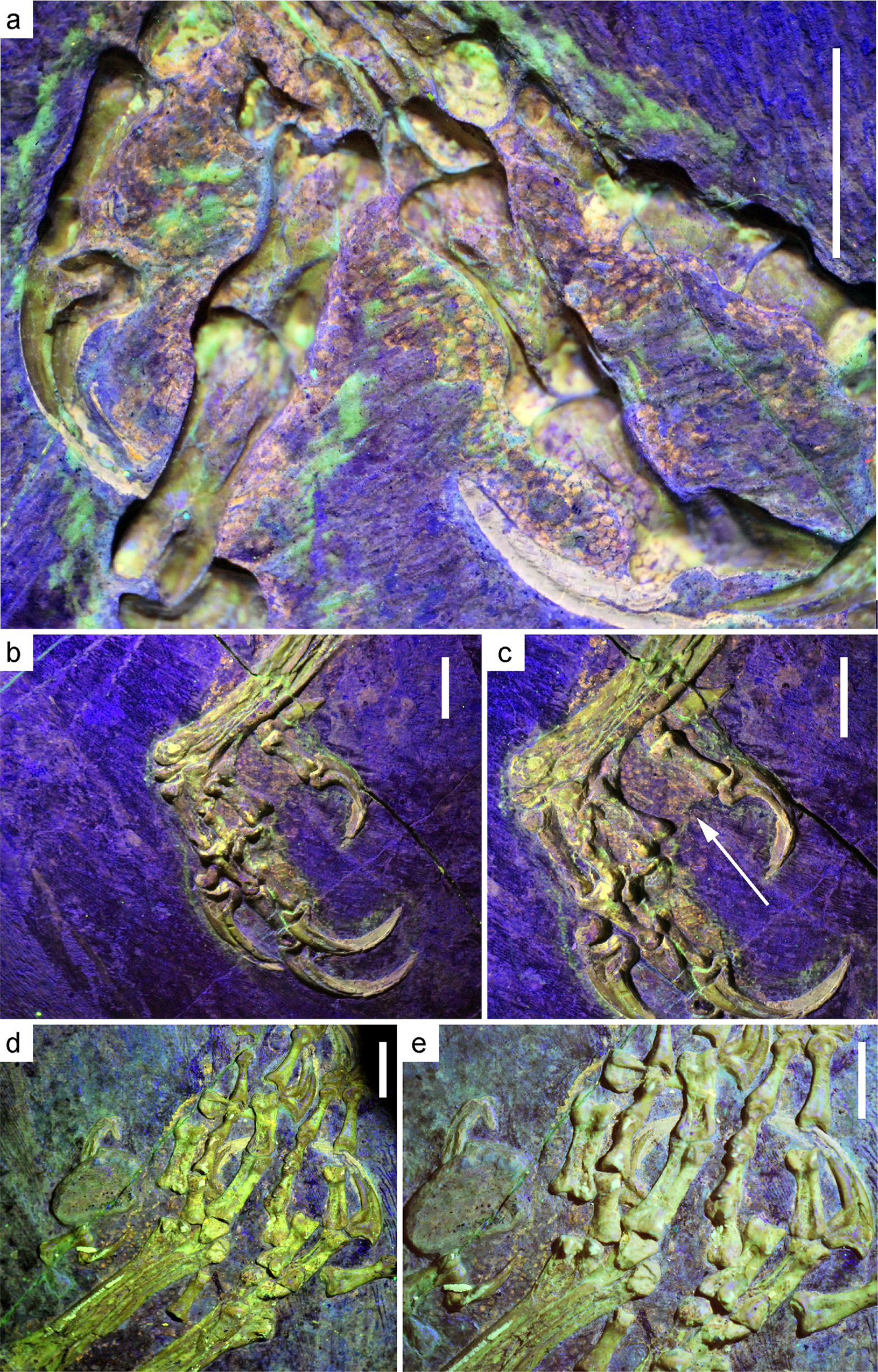
Feet under laser fluorescence, showing scales and foot-pads

The pelvis was connected to a sacrum formed by seven sacral vertebrae. The pubis was strongly pointing backwards. The left and right ischia were not fused. The femur was straight; the tibia only slightly longer. The metatarsals of the foot were relatively short and fused to each other and to the lower ankle bones, forming a tarsometatarsus. A rudimentary fifth metatarsal is present. The first metatarsal was attached to the lower shaft of the second and supported a first toe or hallux, pointing to the back. The formula of the toe phalanges was 2-3-4-5-0. The proportions of the toes suggest that they were used for both walking and perching, while the large claws of the thumb and third finger were probably used for climbing.

=== Feathers and soft tissue ===
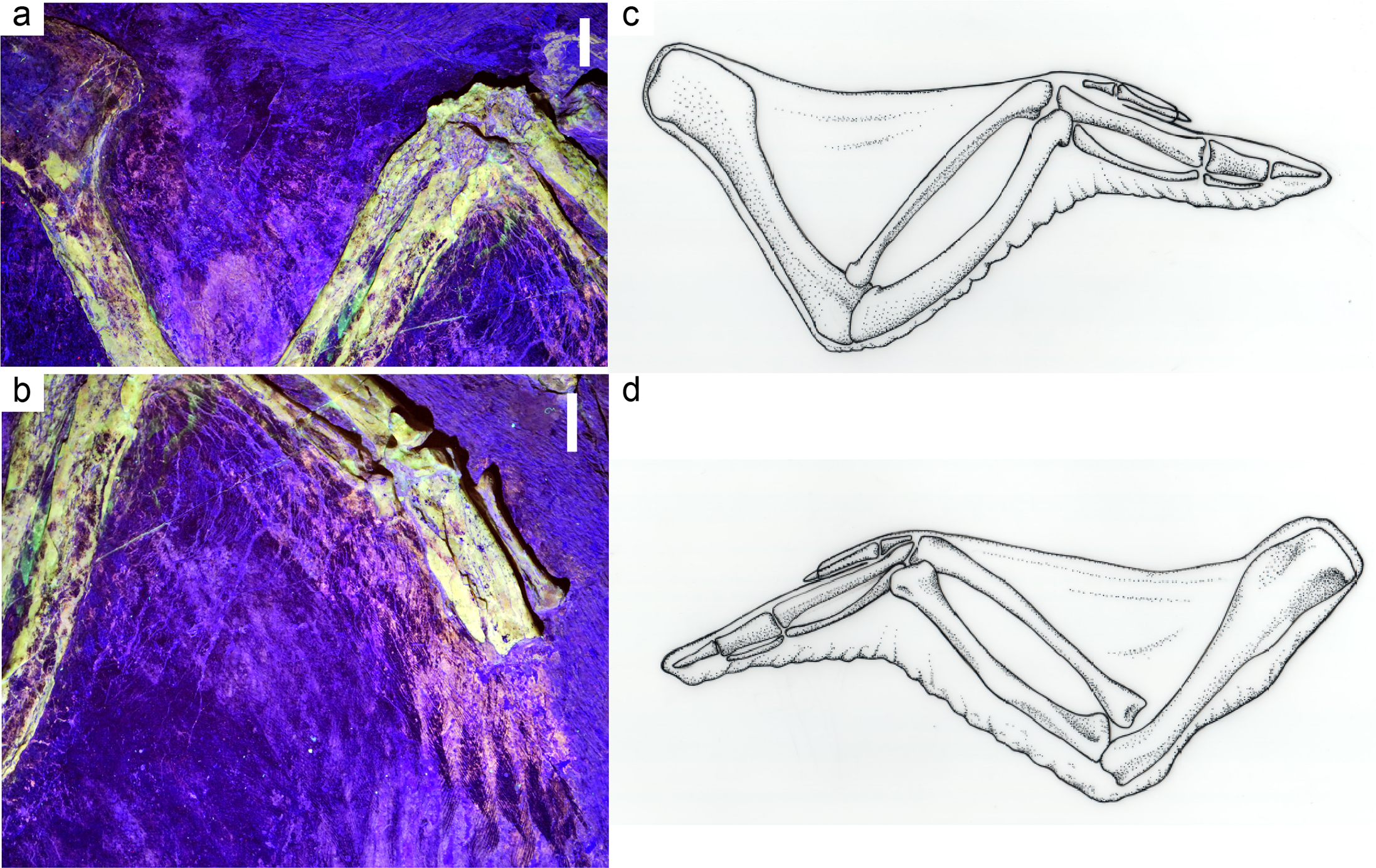
Patagium impressions of Confuciusornis (a, b) compared to the patagium of a chicken (c, d)

The wing feathers of Confuciusornis were long and modern in appearance. The primary wing feathers of a 0.5-kilogram individual reached 20.7 centimetres in length. The five longest primary feathers (remiges primarii) were more than 3 1/2 times the length of the hand and relatively longer than those of any living bird, while the secondary feathers of the lower arm were rather short by comparison. The outermost primary was much shorter than the second outermost primary, creating a relatively round, broad wing. Its wing shape does not specifically match any particular shape found among living birds. The primary feathers were asymmetrical to varying degrees, and especially so in the outermost primaries. It is unclear whether the upper arm carried tertiaries. Covert feathers are preserved covering the upper part of the wing feathers in some specimens, and some specimens have preserved the contour feathers of the body.

Unlike some more advanced birds, Confuciusornis lacked an alula, or "bastard wing". In modern birds this is formed by feathers anchored to the first digit of the hand, but this digit appears to have been free of feathers and independent of the body of the wing in Confuciusornis. According to Dieter Stefan Peters, to compensate for the lack of an alula, the third finger might have formed a separate winglet below the main wing, functioning like the flap of an aircraft. Despite the relatively advanced and long wing feathers, the forearm bones lacked any indication of quill knobs (papillae ulnares), or bony attachment points for the feather ligaments.

Many specimens preserve a pair of long, narrow tail feathers, which grew longer than the entire length of the rest of the body. Unlike the feathers of most modern birds, these feathers were not differentiated into a central quill and barbs for most of their length. Rather, most of the feather formed a ribbon-like sheet, about six millimetres wide. Only at the last one quarter of the feather, towards the rounded tip, does the feather become differentiated into a central shaft with interlocking barbs. Many individuals of Confuciusornis lacked even these two tail feathers, possibly due to sexual dimorphism. The rest of the tail around the pygostyle was covered in short, non-aerodynamic feather tufts similar to the contour feathers of the body, rather than the familiar feather fan of modern bird tails.

Laser fluorescence of two Confuciusornis specimens revealed additional details of their soft-tissue anatomy. The propatagium of Confuciusornis was large, likely relatively thick, and extended from the shoulder to the wrist, as in modern birds; the extent of the postpatagium is also similar to modern birds. Reticulate scales covered the underside of the foot, and the phalanges and metatarsals supported large, fleshy pads, although the interphalangeal pads were either small or entirely absent.

=== Plumage pattern ===
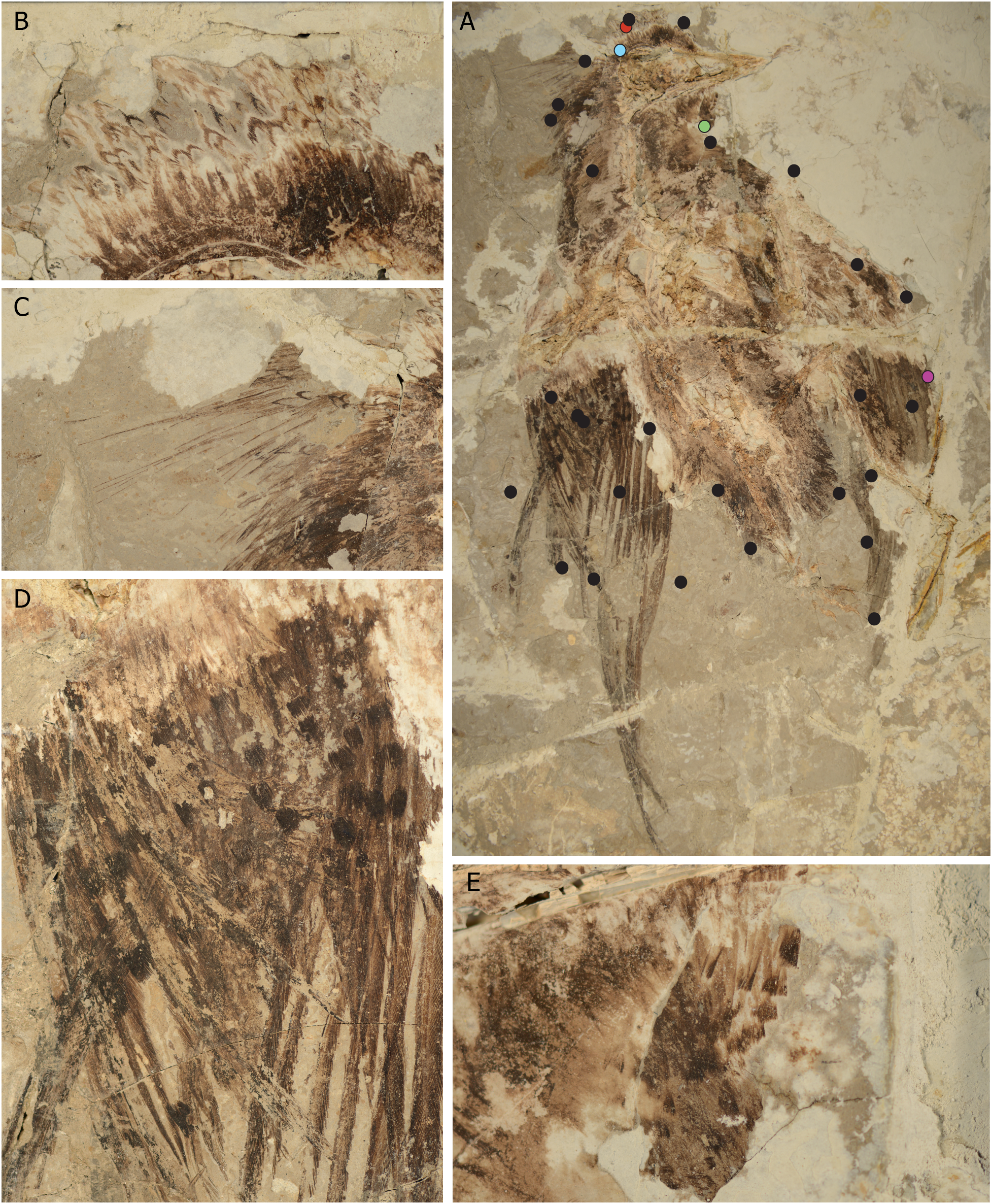
Plumage pattern in specimen CUGB P1401

In early 2010, a group of scientists led by Zhang Fucheng examined fossils with preserved melanosomes (organelles which contain colors). By studying such fossils with an electron microscope, they found melanosomes preserved in a fossil specimen of Confuciusornis sanctus, IVPP V13171. They reported the presence of melanosomes were of two types: eumelanosomes and pheomelanosomes. This indicated that Confuciusornis had hues of grey, red/brown and black, possibly something like the modern zebra finch. It was also the first time an early bird fossil has been shown to contain preserved pheomelanosomes. However, a second research team failed to find these reported traces of pheomelanosomes. Their 2011 study also found a link between the presence of certain metals, like copper, and preserved melanin. Using a combination of fossil impressions of melanosomes and the presence of metals in the feathers, the second team of scientists reconstructed Confuciusornis with darkly colored body feathers and upper wing feathers, but found no trace of either melanosomes or metals in the majority of the wing feathers. They suggested that the wings of Confuciusornis would have been white or, possibly, colored with carotenoid pigments. The long tail feathers of male specimens would have also been dark in color along their entire length.

A 2018 study of the specimen CUGB P1401 indicated the presence of heavy spotting on the wings, throat, and crest of Confuciusornis.

== Classification ==
Hou assigned Confuciusornis to the Confuciusornithidae in 1995. At first he assumed it was a member of the Enantiornithes and the sister taxon of Gobipteryx. Later he understood that Confuciusornis was not an enantiornithean but concluded it was the sister taxon of the Enantiornithes, within a larger Sauriurae. This was heavily criticised by Chiappe who regarded Sauriurae to be paraphyletic as there were insufficient shared traits that indicated that the Confuciusornithidae and the Enantiornithes were closely related. In 2001, Ji Qiang suggested an alternative position as the sister taxon of the Ornithothoraces.

In 2002 Ji's hypothesis was confirmed by a cladistic analysis by Chiappe, who defined a new group: the Pygostylia of which Confuciusornis is by definition the most basal member. Several traits of Confuciusornis show its position in bird evolution; it has a more "primitive" skull than Archaeopteryx, but it is the first known bird to have lost the long tail of Archaeopteryx and develop fused tail vertebrae, a pygostyle. One controversial study concluded that Confuciusornis may be more closely related to Microraptor and other dromaeosaurids than to Archaeopteryx, but this study was criticized on methodological grounds.

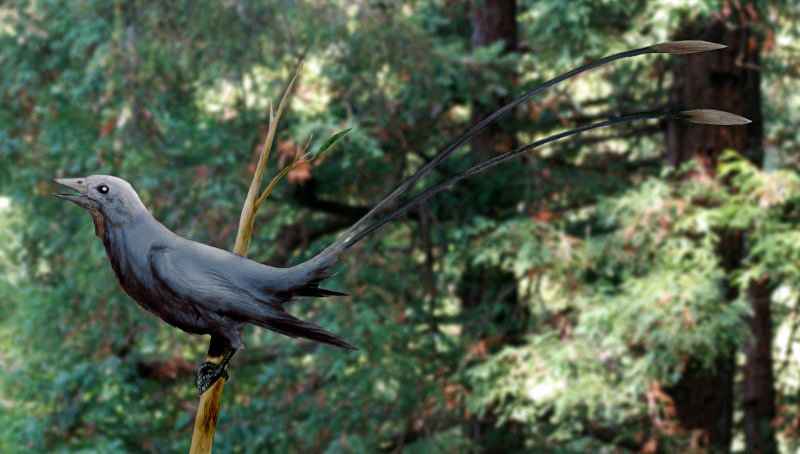
Restoration of the related Eoconfuciusornis

The present standard interpretation of the phylogenetic position of Confuciusornis can be shown in this cladogram:

- Aves
  - Archaeopteryx
  - - Jeholornis
    - - Sapeornis
      - Pygostylia
        - Confuciusornithidae
          - Confuciusornis
          - Changchengornis
        - Ornithothoraces
          - Enantiornithes
          - Ornithuromorpha (including the Neornithes)

A close relative, the confuciusornithid Changchengornis hengdaoziensis, also lived in the Yixian Formation. Changchengornis also possessed the paired, long tail feathers, as did several more advanced enantiornith birds. True, mobile tail fans only appeared in ornithuromorph birds, and possibly in the enantiornithine Shanweiniao.

== Paleobiology ==
The large, fleshy phalangeal foot pads, small interphalangeal foot pads, presence of only reticulate scales on the underside of the foot (which increases flexibility), and curved foot claws of Confuciusornis are all traits shared with modern tree-dwelling, perching birds, suggesting that Confuciusornis may have had a similar lifestyle.

Comparisons between the scleral rings supporting the eyes of Confuciusornis and modern birds and other reptiles indicate that it may have been diurnal, similar to most modern birds.

=== Flight ===
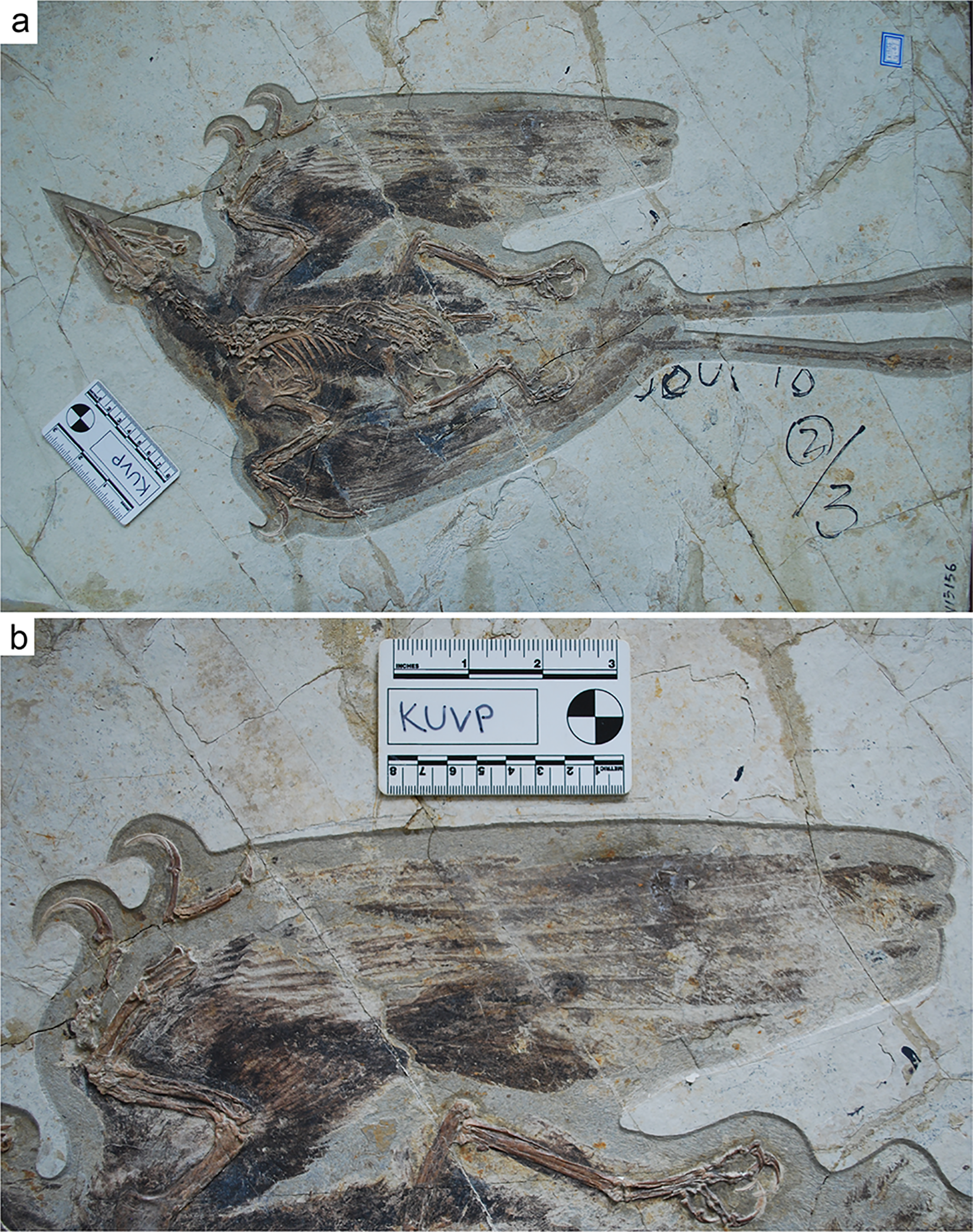
Specimen with close-up of primary feathers; note the shortened outer tenth primary

Confuciusornis has traditionally been assumed to have been a competent flier based on its extremely long wings with strongly asymmetrical feathers. Other adaptations for improved flight capabilities include: a fused wrist, a short tail, an ossified sternum with a central keel, a strut-like coracoid, a large deltopectoral crest, a strong ulna (forearm bone) and an enlarged second metacarpal. The sternal keel and deltopectoral crest (which provides a more powerful upstroke) are adaptations to flapping flight in modern birds, indicating that Confuciusornis may have been capable of the same. However, it may have had a different flight stroke due to being incapable of rotating its arm behind the body, and its relatively smaller sternal keel indicates that it likely was not capable of flight for extended periods of time.

Several contrary claims have been made against that the flight capabilities of Confuciusornis. The first of these regarded problems to attain a steep flight path due to a limited wing amplitude. In Senter's interpretation of the position of the shoulder joint, a normal upstroke would be impossible precluding flapping flight entirely. Less radical is the assessment that due to the lack of a keeled sternum and a high acrocoracoid, the musculus pectoralis minor could not serve as a M. supracoracoideus lifting the humerus via a tendon running through a foramen triosseum. This, coupled with a limited upstroke caused by a lateral position of the shoulder joint, would have made it difficult to gain altitude. Some authors, therefore, proposed that Confuciusornis used its large thumb claws to climb tree trunks. Martin assumed that it could raise its torso almost vertically like a squirrel. Daniel Hembree, however, while acknowledging that tree climbing was likely, pointed out that the rump was apparently not lifted more than 25° relative to the femur in vertical position, as shown by the location of the antitrochanter in the hip joint. Dieter S. Peters considered it very unlikely that Confuciusornis climbed trunks as turning the thumb claw inwards would stretch the very long wing forwards, right in the path of obstructing branches. Peters sees Confuciusornis as capable of flapping flight but specialised in soaring flight.

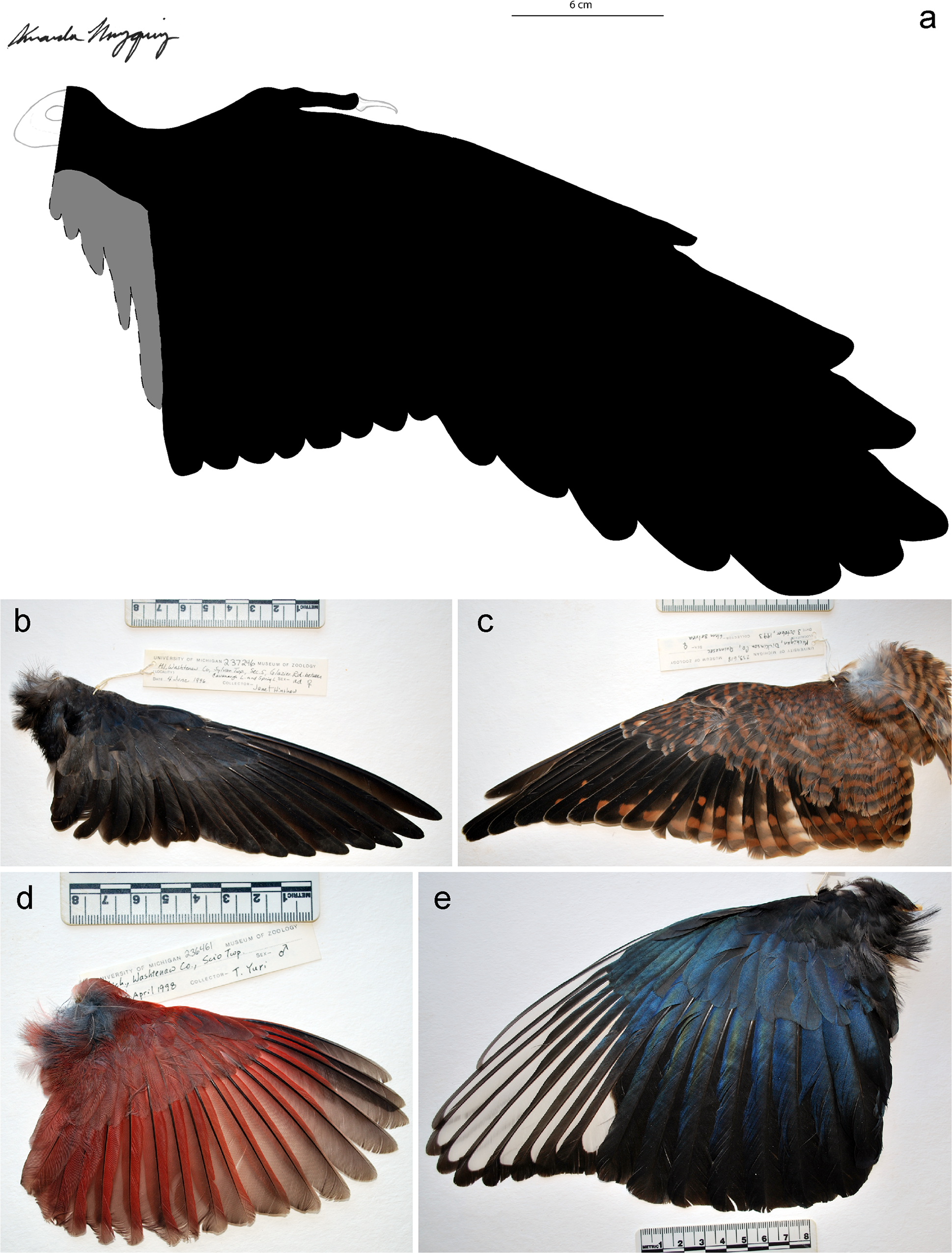
Wing (a) compared to those of modern birds (b-e)

Also a controversy is the strength of the feathers. In 2010, Robert Nudds and Gareth Dyke published a study arguing that in both Confuciusornis and Archaeopteryx, the raches (central shafts) of the primary feathers were too thin and weak to have remained rigid during the power stroke required for true flight. They argued that Confuciusornis would at most have employed gliding flight, which is also consistent with the unusual adaptations seen in its upper arm bones, and more likely used its wings for mere parachuting, limiting fall speed if it dropped from a tree. Gregory S. Paul, however, disagreed with their study. He argued that Nudds and Dyke had overestimated the weights of these early birds, and that more accurate weight estimates allowed powered flight even with relatively narrow raches. Nudds and Dyke assumed a weight of 500 grams (18 oz) for Confuciusornis, as heavy as the modern teal. Paul argued that a more reasonable body weight estimate is about 180 grams (6.3 oz), less than that of a pigeon. Paul also noted that Confuciusornis is commonly found as large assemblages in lake bottom sediments with little to no evidence of extensive postmortem transport, and that it would be highly unusual for gliding animals to be found in such large numbers in deep water. Rather, this evidence suggests that Confuciusornis traveled in large flocks over the lake surfaces, a habitat consistent with a flying animal. A number of researchers have questioned the correctness of the rachis measurements, stating that the specimens they had studied showed a shaft thickness of 2.1–2.3 millimetres (0.083–0.091 in), compared to 1.2 mm (0.047 in) as reported by Nudds and Dyke. Nudd and Dyke replied that, apart from the weight aspect, such greater shaft thickness alone would make flapping flight possible; however, they allowed for the possibility of two species being present in the Chinese fossil material with a differing rachis diameter.

In 2016, Falk et al. argued in favor of flight capabilities for Confuciusornis using evidence from laser fluorescence of two soft tissue-preserving specimens. They found that, contrary to Nudds and Dyke's assertions, the raches of Confuciusornis were relatively robust, with a maximum width of over 1.5 mm (0.059 in). The wing shape is consistent with either birds that live in dense forests or gliding birds; the former is consistent with its environment being densely forested, and requiring more maneuverability and stability than speed. The substantial propatagium would have produced a generous amount of lift, while the likewise large postpatagium would have provided a large attachment area for the calami of the feathers, which would have kept them as a straight airfoil. This collectively is strongly indicative that Confuciusornis was capable of powered flight, if not only for short periods of time.

=== Tail feathers ===
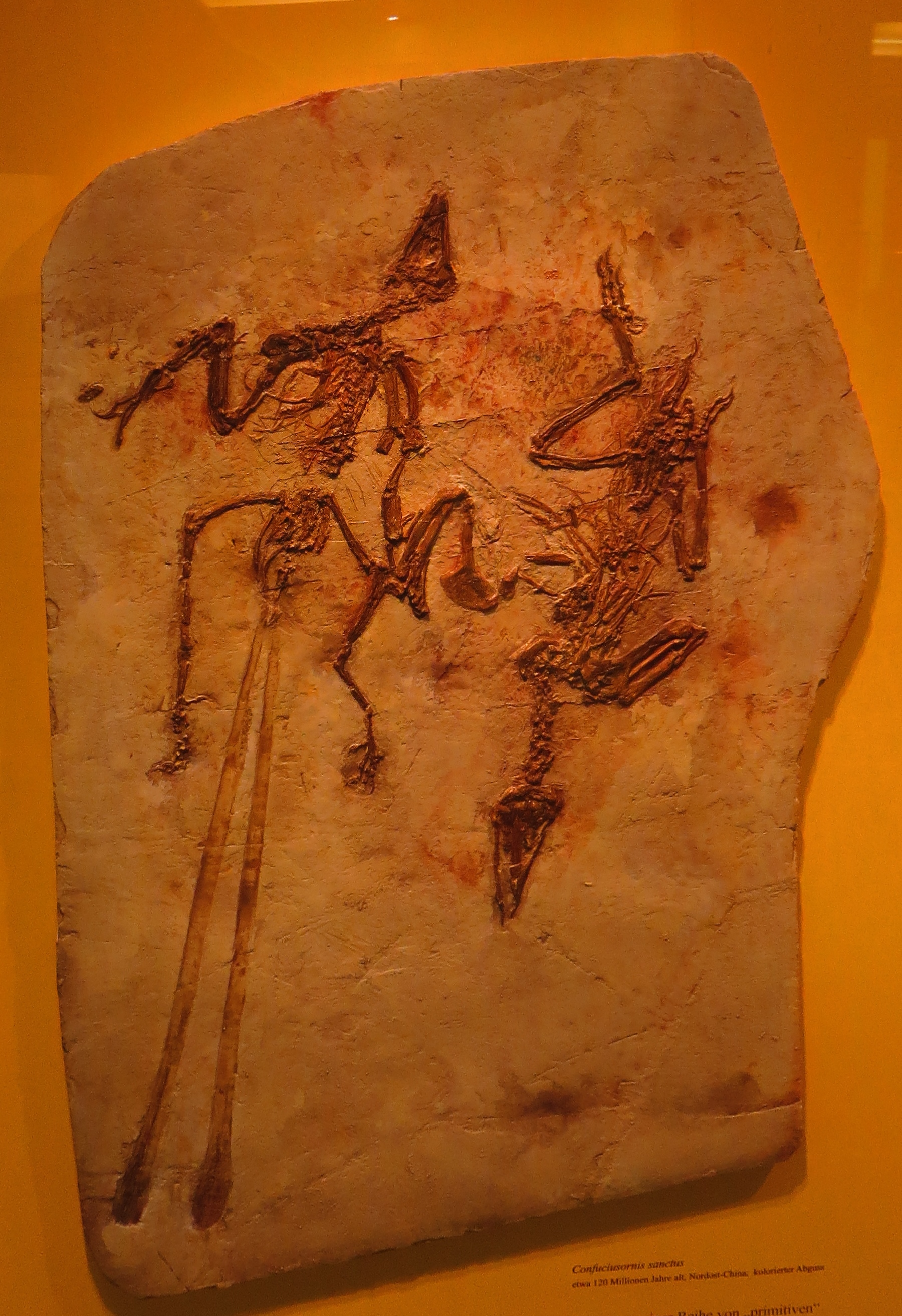
Cast of a slab with long and short tailed specimens of C. sanctus

Many specimens of Confuciusornis preserve a single pair of long, streamer-like tail feathers, similar to those present in some modern birds-of-paradise. Specimens lacking these feathers include ones that otherwise have exquisitely preserved feathers on the rest of the body, indicating that their absence is not simply due to poor preservation. Larry Martin and colleagues stated in 1998 that long tail feathers are present in about 5 to 10% of the specimens known at the time. A 2011 analysis by Jesús Marugán-Lobón and colleagues found that out of 130 specimens, 18% had long tail feathers and 28% had not, while in the remaining 54% preservation was insufficient to determine their presence or absence. The biological meaning of this pattern has been discussed controversially. Martin and colleagues suggested that the pattern might reflect sexual dimorphism, with the streamer-like feathers only present in one sex (likely the males) which used them in courtship displays. This interpretation was followed by the majority of subsequent studies. Chiappe and colleagues, in 1999, argued that sexual dimorphism is not the only but the most reasonable explanation, noting that in modern birds the length of ornamental feathers often varies between the sexes.

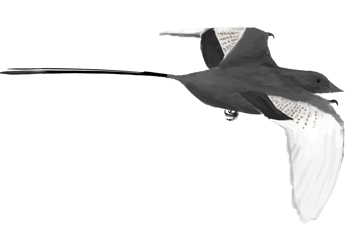
Restoration of a long-tailed individual in flight

Controversy arose from the observation that the known specimens of Confuciusornis can be divided into a small-sized and a large-sized group, but that this bimodal distribution is unrelated to the possession of long tail feathers. Chiappe and colleagues argued in 2008 that this size distribution can be explained by a dinosaur-like mode of growth (see section Growth), and maintained that sexual dimorphism is the most likely explanation for the presence and absence of long tail feathers. Winfried and Dieter Peters, however, responded in 2009 that both sexes likely had long tail feathers, as is the case in most modern birds that show similar feathers. One of the sexes, however, would have been larger than the other (sexual size dimorphism). These researchers further suggested that the distribution of size and long tail feathers in Confuciusornis was similar to the modern pheasant-tailed jacana (Hydrophasianus chirurgus), a water-bird in which and the female is largest and adult individuals of both sexes have long tails, but only during the breeding season. Confuciusornis differs from the jacanas in that long tail feathers are present in specimens of all sizes, even in some of the smallest known specimens. This suggests that the long tail feathers might not have had a function in reproduction at all.

Several alternative hypotheses explaining the frequent absence of long tail feathers have been proposed. In their 1999 study, Chiappe and colleagues discussed the possibility that individuals might lack tail feathers because they died during molting. Although direct evidence for molting in early birds is missing, the lack of feather abrasion in Confuciusornis specimens suggests that the plumage got periodically renewed. As in modern birds, molting individuals may have been present alongside non-molting individuals, and males and females may have molted at different times during the year, possibly explaining the co-occurrence of specimens with and without long tail feathers. Peters and Petters, on the other hand, suggested that Confuciusornis may have shed the feathers as a defense mechanism, a method used by several extant species. Such shedding would have been triggered by stress induced by the very volcanic explosions that buried the animals, resulting in a large number of specimens lacking these feathers. In a 2011 paper, Jesús Marugán-Lobón and colleagues stated that even the presence of two separate species, one with and one without long tail feathers, needs to be considered. This possibility would be, however, unsubstantiated at present, as other anatomical differences between these possible species are not apparent.

=== Reproduction ===
In 2007, Gary Kaiser mentioned a Confuciusornis skeleton preserving an egg near its right foot – the first possible egg referable to the genus. The skeleton is from the short-tailed form and thus might represent a female. The egg might have fallen out of the body after the death of the presumed female, although it cannot be excluded that this association of an adult with an egg was only by chance. The egg is roundish in shape and measures 17 mm in diameter, slightly smaller than the head of the animal; according to Kaiser, it would have fit precisely through the pelvic canal of the bird. In dinosaurs and Mesozoic birds, the width of the pelvic canal was restricted due to connection of the lower ends of the pubic bones, resulting in a V-shaped bony aperture through which eggs must fit. In modern birds, this connection of the pubic bones is lost, presumably allowing for larger eggs. In a 2010 paper, Gareth Dyke and Kaiser showed that the breadth of the Confuciusornis egg was indeed smaller than what would be expected for a modern bird of similar size. In a 2016 book, Luis Chiappe and Meng Qingjin stated that the aperture of a large specimen (DNHM-D 2454) indicates a maximum egg diameter of 23 millimetres (0.91 in). In modern birds, proportionally large eggs are commonly found in species whose hatchlings do fully depend on their parents (altriciality), while smaller eggs are often found in species whose hatchlings are more developed and independent (precociality). As the estimated egg of the specimen would have been around 30% smaller than expected for a modern altricial bird, it is likely that Confuciusornis was precocial. A 2018 study by Charles Deeming and Gerald Mayr measured the size of the pelvic canal of various Mesozoic birds including Confuciusornis to estimate egg size, concluding that eggs would have been small in proportion to body mass for Mesozoic birds in general. These researchers further posit that an avian-style contact incubation (sitting on eggs for breeding) was not possible for non-avian dinosaurs and Mesozoic birds, including Confuciusornis, as these animals would have been too heavy in relation to the size of their eggs. Kaiser, in 2007, argued that Confuciusornis likely did not brood in an open nest but might have used crevices in trees for protection, and that the small size of the only known egg indicates large clutch sizes. In contrast, a 2016 review by David Varricchio and Frankie Jackson argued that nesting above the ground evolved only at a much later stage, within Neornithes, and that Mesozoic birds would have buried their eggs on the ground, either fully or partially, as seen in non-avian dinosaurs.

=== Growth ===
Growth can be reconstructed based on the inner bone structure. The first such study on Confuciusornis, presented by Fucheng Zhang and colleagues in 1998, used scanning electron microscopy to analyze a femur in cross section. Because the bone was well vascularized (contained many blood vessels) and showed only a single line of arrested growth (growth ring), these authors determined that growth must have been fast and continuous as in modern birds, and that Confuciusornis must have been endothermic. Zhang and colleagues corroborated this claim in a subsequent paper, stating that the bone structure was unlike that of a modern ectothermic alligator but similar to the feathered non-avian dinosaur Beipiaosaurus. However, these authors assumed that endothermy in Confuciusornis had evolved independently from that seen in modern birds. This concurred with earlier work by Anusuya Chinsamy and colleagues, who described distinct lines of arrested growth and low vascularity in other Mesozoic birds that are more derived than Confuciusornis. Both features indicate slow growth, which, according to Chinsamy and colleagues, suggests low metabolic rates. Full endothermy, therefore, would have evolved late on the evolutionary line leading to modern birds. This view was contested by subsequent studies, which pointed out that slow growing bone is not necessarily an indicator for low metabolic rates, and in the case of Mesozoic birds was rather a result of the decrease in body size that characterized the early evolution of birds. A more comprehensive study based on thin sectioning of bones was published by Armand de Ricqlès and colleagues in 2003. Based on 80 thin sections taken from an adult Confuciusornis exemplar, this study confirmed the high growth rates proposed by Zhang and colleagues. The fast-growing fibrolamellar bone tissue was similar to that seen in non-avian theropods, and the sampled individual probably reached adult size in much less than 20 weeks. Small body size was not primarily achieved by slowing growth but by shortening the period of rapid growth. The growth rate estimated for Confuciusornis is still lower than the extremely fast growth characteristic for modern birds (6–8 weeks), suggesting that that growth was secondarily accelerated later in avian evolution.

In 2008 Chiappe and colleagues conducted a statistical analysis based on 106 specimens to explore the relationship between body size and the possession of long tail feathers. The population showed a clear bimodal distribution of the size of the animals with two distinct weight classes. However, there was no correlation between size and the possession of the long tail feathers. From this it was concluded that either the sexes did not differ in size or both sexes had the long feathers. The first case was deemed most likely which left the size distribution to be explained. It was hypothesized that the smaller animals consisted of very young individuals, that the large animals were adults and that the rarity of individuals with an intermediate size was caused by Confuciusornis experiencing a growth spurt just prior to reaching adulthood, the shortness of which would have prevented many becoming fossilized during this phase. This initially slow growth followed by a growth spurt would have resulted in a S-shaped growth curve, similar to that inferred for non-avian dinosaurs. Such an extended dinosaurian mode of growth conflicts with the earlier histological findings of de Ricqlès that suggest a much shorter, avian-style growth. Alternatively, the observed size distribution might also be explained by the presence of more than one species, although there are no anatomical features that could be correlated with these potential species. It could also be explained by assuming an attritional death assemblage, in which mortality rates (and thus the number of preserved fossils) are highest in young and in very old individuals.

The idea of a dinosaur-like mode of growth was criticized by Winfried and Dieter Peters in 2008, who argued that the body size of the smaller size class was too large to possibly have represented the youngest growth state. Analyzing an extended data set, these researchers identified a third size class that supposedly represented this youngest growth state. As it would be highly unlikely that Confuciusornis showed two distinct growth spurts, a feature unseen in known amniotes, they concluded that the two larger size classes represented the two sexes rather than growth stages (sexual size dimorphism). The long tail feathers would have occurred in both sexes, one of which was the largest. This interpretation is consistent with an avian-style mode of growth, as it was suggested by the earlier histological studies. It is also consistent with comparisons to modern birds, in which long tail feathers are typically unrelated to the sexes. The absence of long tail feathers in many specimens was suggested to be the result of stress-induced shedding prior to death.

Chiappe and colleagues defended their findings in a 2010 comment, arguing that the assumed short, avian-like growth period is unlikely. The calculation presented by De Ricqlès in 2003 of a growth phase of less than 20 weeks was based on the assumption that bone diameters grew by 10 μm per day, which is subjective. Rather, histology reveals the presence of different tissue types in the bone that grew at different rates, as well as pauses in growth as indicated by the lines of arrested growth. Thus, growth periods must have been longer than in modern birds and likely took several years, as is true for the modern kiwi. The observed size distribution can, therefore, be feasibly explained by assuming a dinosaurian-style growth. In an invited reply in 2010, Peters and Peters stated that Chiappe and colleagues did not comment on their main argument, the gap in body size between the smaller size class and inferred hatchlings, which accounts for one order of magnitude and would be most consistent with a sexual size dimorphism. Marugán-Lobón and colleagues studied the relationships between the presence and absence of long tail feathers and the lengths of various long bones of the arms and limbs, using a once more enlarged sample of 130 specimens. While confirming that the tail feathers are unrelated to body size, their presence corresponds to different proportions of the forelimb compared to the hind limb. The authors concluded that the meaning of the observed distributions of both the tail feathers and the body size remains contentious.

Chiappe and colleagues, in their 2008 study, concluded that limb bones growth was almost isometric, meaning that skeletal proportions did not change during growth. This was contested by Peters and Peters in 2009, who observed that wing bones tended to be proportionally longer in very small individuals, as seen in modern chicken, and thus grew allometrically. Chiappe and colleagues, in their 2010 comment, responded that proportional variation is present across the whole size range, and that the presence of allometry was not conclusively demonstrated by the analyses presented by Peters and Peters.

=== Possible medullary bone ===
A 2013 histological study by Anusuya Chinsamy and colleagues found medullary bone within the long bones of a short tailed specimen (DNHM-D1874), while three long-tailed specimens lacked medullary bone. In modern birds, medullary bone only forms temporarily in females, where it functions as a calcium reservoir for eggshell production. Therefore, these authors suggested short-tailed specimens to be females, and long-tailed specimens to be males. The female specimen had already passed its rapid growth phase, although it was still significantly smaller than the maximum size reached by Confuciusornis exemplars. At least two lines of arrested growth (growth lines that form annually) could be identified, demonstrating an extended growth over several years; the studied female would have been in its third year. Long tail feathers were confirmed to occur in small individuals, the smallest of which was only around 23% the mass of the largest specimens. Assuming that the occurrence of tail feathers indicates sexual maturity, the authors concluded that the latter must have occurred well before the animals reached their final size, unlike in birds but similar to non-avian dinosaurs. In a 2018 study, Jingmai O'Connor and colleagues questioned the identification of medullary bone, arguing that the purported medullary bone was only found in the forelimb, while in modern birds it is mostly present in the hind limb. Furthermore, the tissue in question is merely preserved as small fragments, rendering its interpretation difficult. However, the authors were able to identify medullary bone in the hind limb of an enantiornithine, a more derived group of Mesozoic birds. As is the case with the Confuciusornis specimen, this supposed female did not reach its final size, supporting the dinosaur-like mode of growth in basal birds that was inferred by the earlier studies.

=== Diet ===
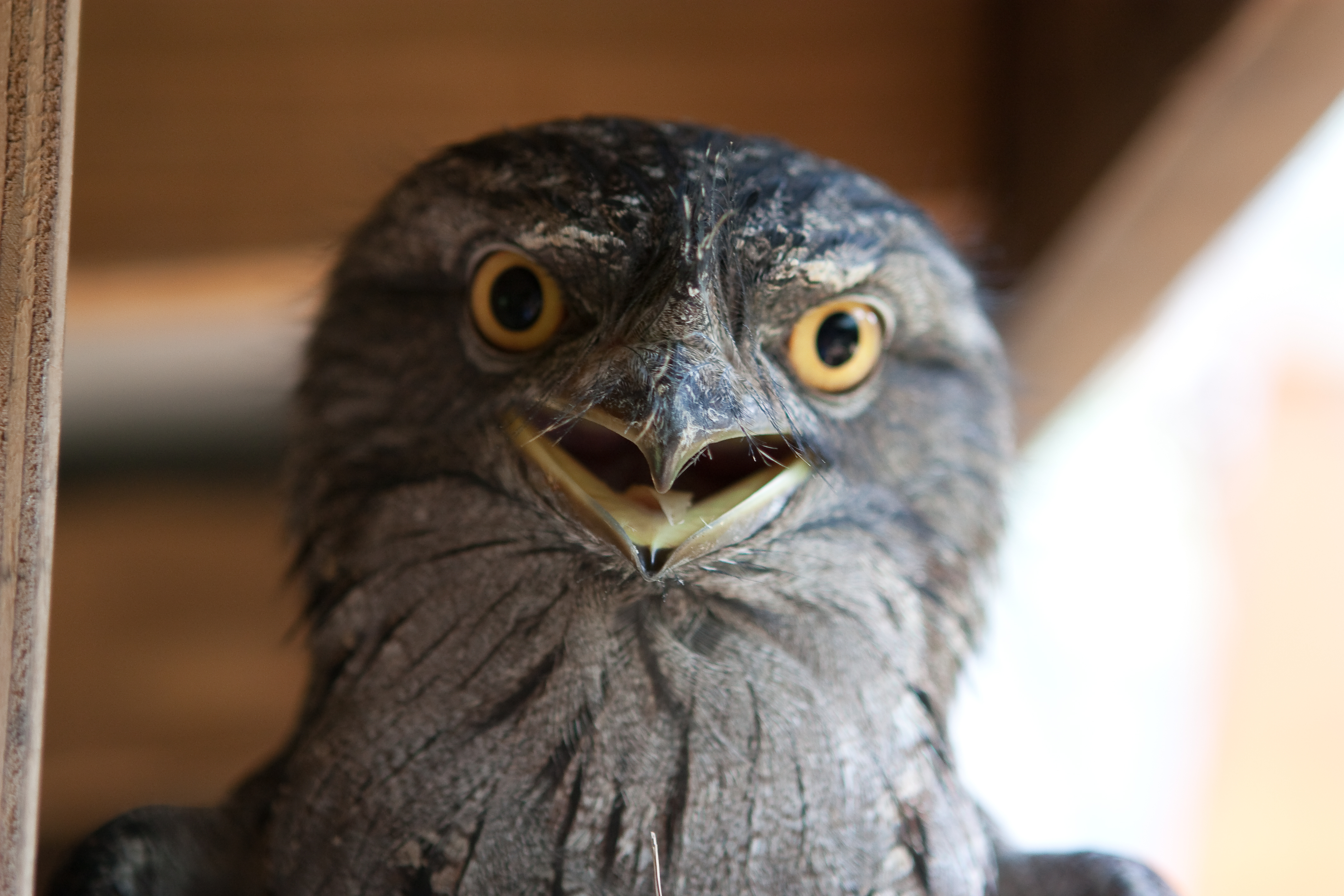
Sally-striking birds with broad gapes and large jaws, such as the tawny frogmouth, may be the closest modern analogues to Confuciusornis

In 1999, Chinese paleontologist Lianhai Hou and colleagues suggested that Confuciusornis was likely herbivorous, though no stomach contents were yet known, pointing out that the beak curved upwards and was not raptorial. Paleontologists Dieter S. Peters and Ji Qiang hypothesized in 1999 that, although no remains of toe webs have been conserved, it caught its prey swimming using its rather soft bill to search for prey below the waterline. Several extant bird species have been presented as modern analogues of Confuciusornis providing insight into its possible lifestyle. Peters thought that it could be best compared with the white-tailed tropicbird (Phaeton lepturus), a fisher that too has a long tail and narrow wings—and even often nests in the neighbourhood of volcanoes.

Polish paleontologist Andrzej Elżanowski, in 2002, found it unlikely that a long-winged and short-legged bird like Confuciusornis would forage in tree crowns, and instead proposed that it foraged on the wing, seizing prey from the water or ground surface. Indications for this included the combination of long wings that appear adapted for soaring, leg proportions (long femur, short foot) that are similar to those of frigate birds and kingfishers, and occipital foramen that opened at the back, a toothless beak similar to but shorter than that of kookaburras, and the absence of specializations for swimming. He conceded that Confuciusornis may have been able to swim, as it possibly foraged over water.

In 2003 Chinese paleontologists Zhonghe Zhou and Fucheng Zhang stated that though nothing was known about its diet, its robust and toothless jaws suggested it could have fed on seeds, and noted Jeholornis preserved direct evidence of such a diet.

In 2006, Johan Dalsätt and colleagues described a C. sanctus specimen (IVPP V13313) from the Jiufotang Beds which preserves seven to nine vertebrae and several ribs of a small fish, probably Jinanichthys. These fish bones are formed into a tight cluster about 6 mm (0.24 in) across, and the cluster is in contact with the seventh and eighth cervical vertebrae of the bird. The condition of the fish indicates it was about to be regurgitated as a pellet, or that it was stored in the crop. No other fish remains are present in the slab. Though it is unknown how common fish were in the diet of Confuciusornis, the finding did not support a herbivorous diet, and the researchers pointed out that no specimens have been found with gastroliths (stomach stones), which are swallowed by birds to help digest plant fibers. Instead, they suggested it would have been omnivorous, similar to for example crows.

Andrei Zinoviev assumed it caught fish on the wing.

The skull was relatively immobile, incapable of the kinesis of modern birds that can raise the snout relative to the back of the skull. This immobility was caused by the presence of a triradiate postorbital separating the eye socket from the lower temporal opening, as with more basal theropod dinosaurs, and the premaxillae of the snout reaching all the way to the frontals, forcing the nasals to the sides of the snout.

== Paleoenvironment and paleoecology ==
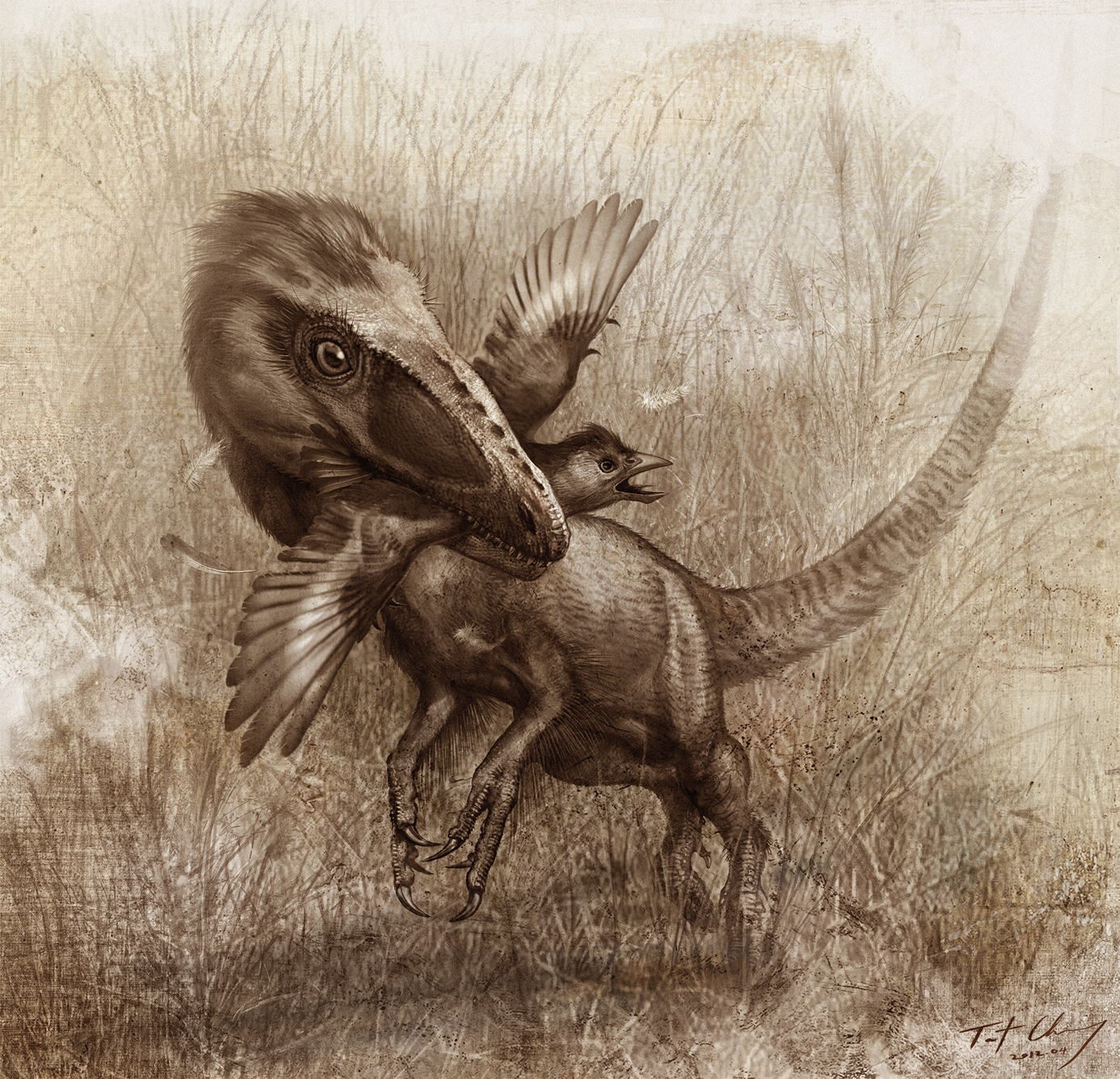
Sinocalliopteryx preying on Confuciusornis, as indicated by stomach contents of the former

Confuciusornis was discovered in the Yixian and Jiufotang Formations and is a member of the Jehol Biota. Tuff makes up a considerable amount of the rock composition in both due to frequent volcanic eruptions, which were slightly more frequent in the Yixian Formation. Shale and mudstone also are major components of the formations. The tuff has allowed detailed dating of the formations by using ^{40}Ar-^{39}Ar isotopes. This results in an age of approximately 125 to 120 million years ago for the Yixian formation and approximately 120.3 million years ago for the Jiufotang Formation. The fossils were buried as a result of flooding and volcanic debris. This method of preservation resulted in fossils that are very flat, almost two-dimensional. The volcanic strata have allowed the preservation of various soft tissues, such as detailed feather impressions. Using oxygen isotopes in reptile bones found in the formation, a 2010 study determined that many formations from East Asia, including the Yixian, had a cool temperate climate. The mean air temperature of the Yixian Formation was estimated at 10 °C ± 4 °C. Fossils of Xenoxylon, a type of wood known from temperate areas of the time, have been found throughout the region. Additionally, reptiles needing heat, such as crocodilians, are absent.

The majority of Jehol flora has been discovered in the lower Yixian Formation. This flora includes most groups of Mesozoic plants, including mosses, clubmosses, horsetails, ferns, seed ferns, Czekanowskiales, ginkgo trees, cycadeoids, Gnetales, conifers, and a small number of flowering plants. Fauna that were present in the Jehol Biota include ostracods, gastropods, bivalves, insects, fish, salamanders, mammals, lizards, choristoderes, pterosaurs, and dinosaurs (including birds). These fossils are exceptionally well preserved, with dinosaur fossils frequently preserving filaments and feather impressions and sometimes even pigmentation, such as in Microraptor (an aerial predator of the Jiufotang Formation), Psittacosaurus (a small ceratopsian with a wide distribution throughout both formations), and Sinosauropteryx (a compsognathid and one of the first dinosaurs recovered from the Yixian). Other feathered dinosaurs of the Jehol Biota include the large compsognathid Sinocalliopteryx gigas, a specimen of which was discovered with Confuciusornis bones in its abdominal contents, the small herbivorous oviraptorosaur Caudipteryx, and the large tyrannosauroid Yutyrannus, all from the Yixian Formation. Jehol birds are represented by more than 20 genera, including basal avialans (such as Confucisornis, Jeholornis, and Sapeornis), more derived enantiornithes (such as Eoenantiornis, Longirostravis, Sinornis, Boluochia, and Longipteryx), and even further derived ornithurines (such as Liaoningornis, Yixianornis, and Yanornis).

== See also ==
- Dinosaur coloration
