= Caojiawa Township =

Caojiawa Township 曹家洼乡
- Rural Township
- Cáojiāwā Xiāng
- Location in Hebei Location in China
- Coordinates: 37°37′17″N 116°26′44″E
- Country: People's Republic of China
- Province: Hebei
- Prefecture-level city: Cangzhou
- County: Wuqiao

Area
  - Total: 52.27 km^{2} (20.18 sq mi)

Population (2010)
  - Total: 20,881
  - Density: 399.5/km^{2} (1,035/sq mi)
- Time zone: UTC+8 (China Standard)

Caojiawa Township (Chinese: 曹家洼乡; pinyin: Cáojiāwā Xiāng) is a rural township located in Wuqiao County, Cangzhou, Hebei, China. According to the 2010 census, Caojiawa Township had a population of 20,881, including 10,320 males and 10,561 females. The population was distributed as follows: 3,409 people aged under 14, 15,530 people aged between 15 and 64, and 1,942 people aged over 65.

== See also ==
- List of township-level divisions of Hebei
