= Wuqiao County =

Wuqiao County 吴桥县 Wukiao
- County
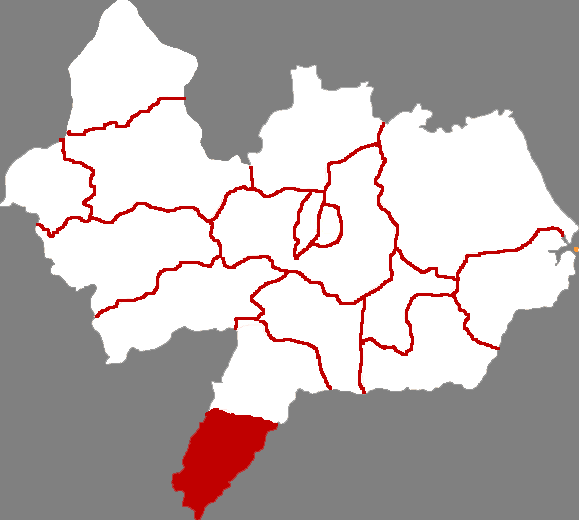
- Wuqiao in Cangzhou

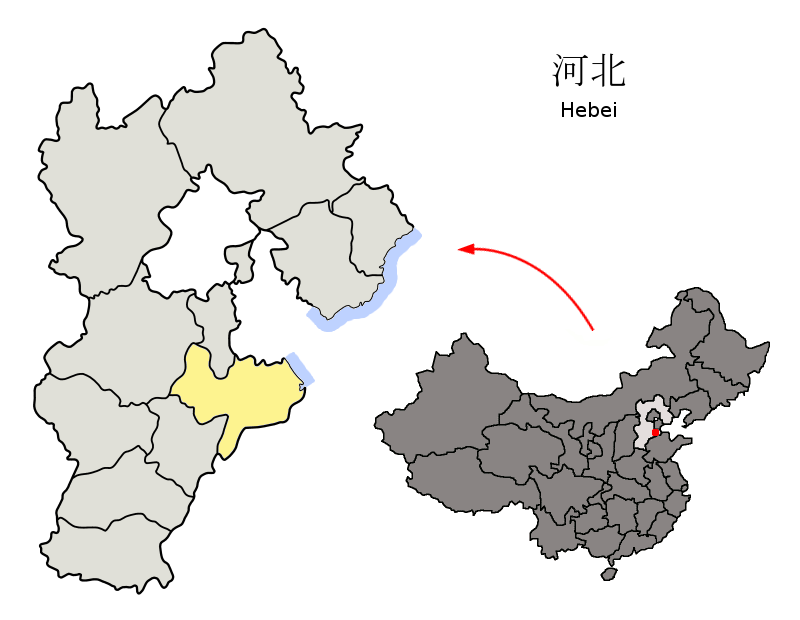
- Cangzhou in Hebei
- Coordinates: 37°37′38″N 116°23′29″E
- Country: People's Republic of China
- Province: Hebei
- Prefecture-level city: Cangzhou
- County seat: Sangyuan

Area
  - Total: 583 km^{2} (225 sq mi)

Population (2020 census)
  - Total: 217,986
  - Density: 374/km^{2} (968/sq mi)
- Time zone: UTC+8 (China Standard)
- Postal code: 062650
- Area code: 0317
- Website: www.wuqiao.gov.cn

Wuqiao County (simplified Chinese: 吴桥县; traditional Chinese: 吳橋縣; pinyin: Wúqiáo Xiàn, literally "Wu Bridge") is a county of southeastern Hebei province, China, bordering Shandong province to the southeast. It is the southernmost county-level division of the prefecture-level city of Cangzhou. Wuqiao covers an area of 583 km^{2} (225 sq mi) with a population of 220,000 in 2020 and 444 natural villages under its jurisdiction. Over a period of more than 1500 years, Wuqiao is an old county with a vivid and rich history and culture. Wuqiao is situated in the center of the Huabei Plains and has a pleasant climate most of the year round and it is possible to pleasurably visit here at almost any time of the year.

Near the cities Beijing, Tianjin, Shijiazhuang, and Jinan, Wuqiao County has many transportation connections. There are many rail and bus services operating in the town. Wuqiao was the first Chinese city to open up its doors to the world under the "Open Door" policy and over many years development, Wuqiao has become a flourishing city with a favorable investment environment.

== Administrative Divisions ==
Towns:

- Sangyuan (桑园镇), Tiecheng (铁城镇), Yuji (于集镇), Liangji, Wuqiao County (梁集镇), Anling (安陵镇)

Townships:

- Caojiawa Township (曹家洼乡), Songmen Township (宋门乡), Yangjiasi Township (杨家寺乡), Goudianpu Township (沟店铺乡), Hezhuang Township (何庄乡)

== Climate ==
Climate data for Wuqiao, elevation 17 m (56 ft), (1991–2020 normals, extremes 1981–2010)
Month	Jan	Feb	Mar	Apr	May	Jun	Jul	Aug	Sep	Oct	Nov	Dec	Year
Record high °C (°F)	16.3 (61.3)	22.8 (73.0)	30.8 (87.4)	33.7 (92.7)	39.9 (103.8)	41.6 (106.9)	42.0 (107.6)	36.8 (98.2)	36.3 (97.3)	31.9 (89.4)	25.6 (78.1)	18.8 (65.8)	42.0 (107.6)
Mean daily maximum °C (°F)	3.3 (37.9)	6.8 (44.2)	15.0 (59.0)	21.2 (70.2)	27.4 (81.3)	32.0 (89.6)	32.3 (90.1)	30.5 (86.9)	26.9 (80.4)	21.2 (70.2)	12.1 (53.8)	4.9 (40.8)	19.5 (67.0)
Daily mean °C (°F)	−2.7 (27.1)	0.6 (33.1)	8.3 (46.9)	14.6 (58.3)	21.1 (70.0)	25.8 (78.4)	27.3 (81.1)	25.6 (78.1)	20.9 (69.6)	14.3 (57.7)	6.0 (42.8)	−0.9 (30.4)	13.4 (56.1)
Mean daily minimum °C (°F)	−7.0 (19.4)	−3.9 (25.0)	2.7 (36.9)	8.7 (47.7)	15.1 (59.2)	20.1 (68.2)	22.9 (73.2)	21.7 (71.1)	16.2 (61.2)	9.1 (48.4)	1.5 (34.7)	−5.1 (22.8)	8.5 (47.3)
Record low °C (°F)	−18.3 (−0.9)	−15.0 (5.0)	−8.9 (16.0)	−2.3 (27.9)	4.3 (39.7)	9.6 (49.3)	16.3 (61.3)	12.3 (54.1)	5.4 (41.7)	−3.7 (25.3)	−12.1 (10.2)	−20.0 (−4.0)	−20.0 (−4.0)
Average precipitation mm (inches)	2.5 (0.10)	7.0 (0.28)	8.4 (0.33)	26.0 (1.02)	41.3 (1.63)	76.9 (3.03)	163.3 (6.43)	133.7 (5.26)	37.2 (1.46)	28.5 (1.12)	14.4 (0.57)	3.4 (0.13)	542.6 (21.36)
Average precipitation days (≥ 0.1 mm)	1.8	2.6	2.4	4.9	6.0	8.0	11.2	9.7	5.9	5.1	4.1	2.0	63.7
Average snowy days	2.4	2.7	0.9	0.2	0	0	0	0	0	0	1.1	1.6	8.9
Average relative humidity (%)	62	58	53	57	61	62	77	82	75	69	69	66	66
Mean monthly sunshine hours	164.6	169.7	219.7	243.0	274.6	230.4	199.8	204.0	205.6	200.2	162.6	154.8	2,429
Percentage possible sunshine	54	55	59	61	62	52	45	49	56	58	54	52	55
Source: China Meteorological Administration

== Wuqiao acrobatic culture ==
The history of Wuqiao county records that lamps lighted up the whole county of Wuqiao for three days during festivals, people set off firecrackers and performed acrobatics, and the local feudal officials did not practice curfew in the period.

The tomb murals of the Eastern Wei dynasty (534–550) in the Northern and Southern dynasties period (386–581) unearthed from Xiaomachang Village of Wuqiao County in 1958 depict the performances of handstands, plate spinning, deft horsemanship and so on. However, it was after the Yuan dynasty (1271–1368) that acrobatics of Wuqiao gained much reputation. Before that, acrobatics in Henan Province was much more influential. After the Yuan dynasty was established, the capital was moved from Kaifeng of Henan to Beijing, and the acrobatics in Wuqiao of Hebei, which neighbors Beijing, began to prosper and was increasingly influential.

Wuqiao people are now known for their acrobatic ability and are often in acrobatic troupes throughout China and across the world. When Premier Zhou Enlai visited European countries, he found Wuqiao acrobats often when he met with overseas Chinese. He said that Wuqiao is worth the title of 'home of Chinese acrobatics'.
