= Sangyuan, Wuqiao County =

Sangyuan
- Town

Chinese transcription(s)
  - Chinese: 桑园
  - Pinyin: Sāngyuán
- Location within Hebei
- Coordinates: 37°40′N 116°21′E
- Country: China
- Province: Hebei
- Prefecture: Cangzhou
- County: Wuqiao

Area
  - Total: 37.4 km^{2} (14.4 sq mi)

Population
  - Total: 45,400
  - Density: 1,210/km^{2} (3,140/sq mi)
- Time zone: UTC+8 (China Standard)
- Postal code: 062650
- Area code: 0317

Sangyuan (Chinese: 桑园; pinyin: Sāngyuán) is a town and the county seat of Wuqiao County, Hebei Province of the People's Republic of China. Sangyuan covers an area of 37.4 square kilometers with a population of 45,400 and 9 communities and 33 villages under its jurisdiction. As of 2018, it has 8 residential communities and 33 villages under its administration.
