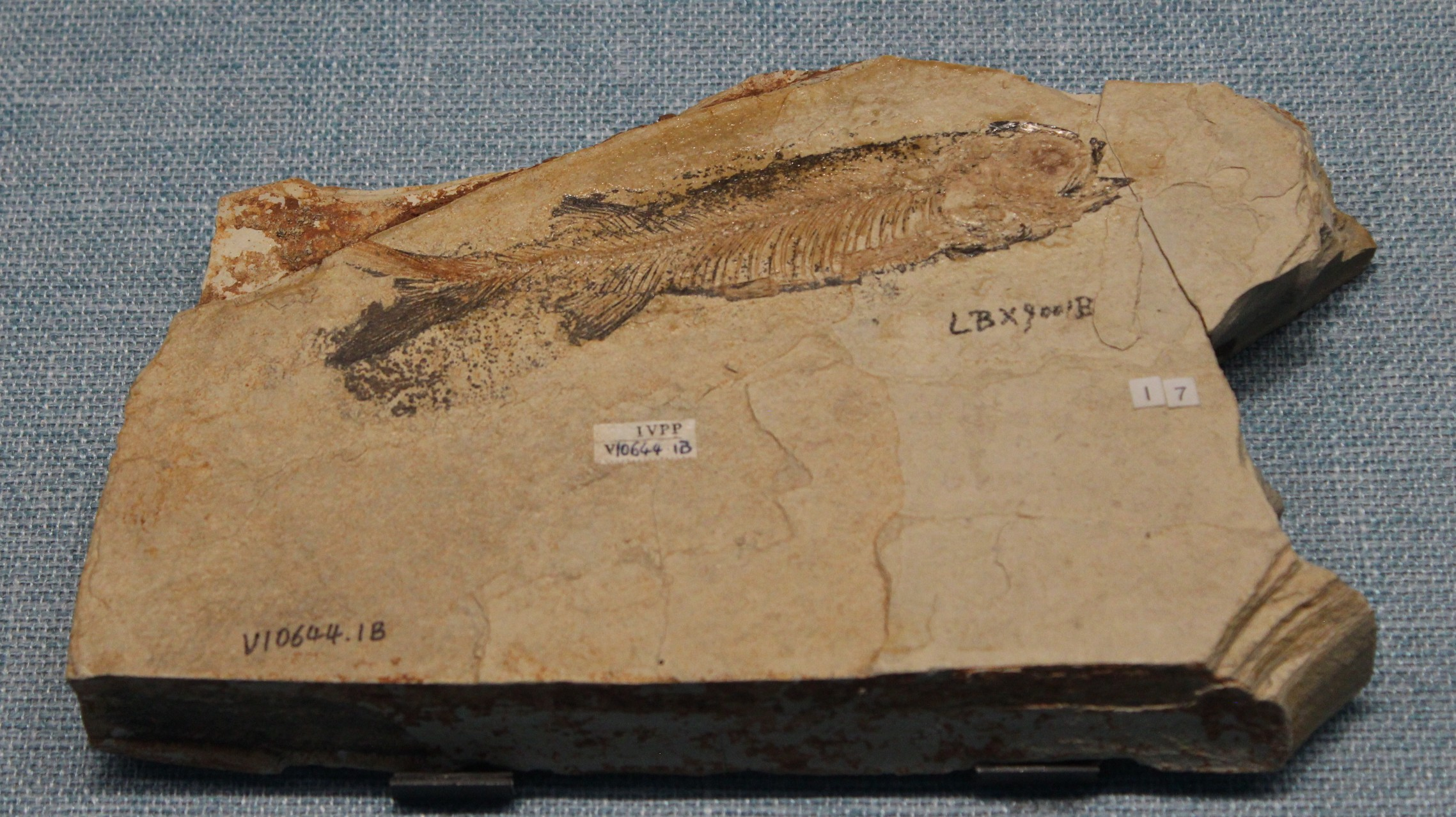
- Fossil specimen at the Baoding Natural History Museum

Scientific classification
- Kingdom: Animalia
- Phylum: Chordata
- Class: Actinopterygii
- Order: Osteoglossiformes
- Genus: †Jinanichthys; Ma & Sun, 1988

Type species
- †Jinanichthys longicephalus (Liu et al., 1963)

Synonyms
- Lycoptera longicephalus Liu et al., 1963; Changichthys dalinghensis Su, 1991; Liaoxiichthys longicephalus Su, 1992

= Jinanichthys =

Jinanichthys Temporal range: Early Cretaceous

Extinct genus of fishes

Jinanichthys (meaning "southern Jilin fish") is an extinct genus of osteoglossiform which existed in China during the early Cretaceous period.
