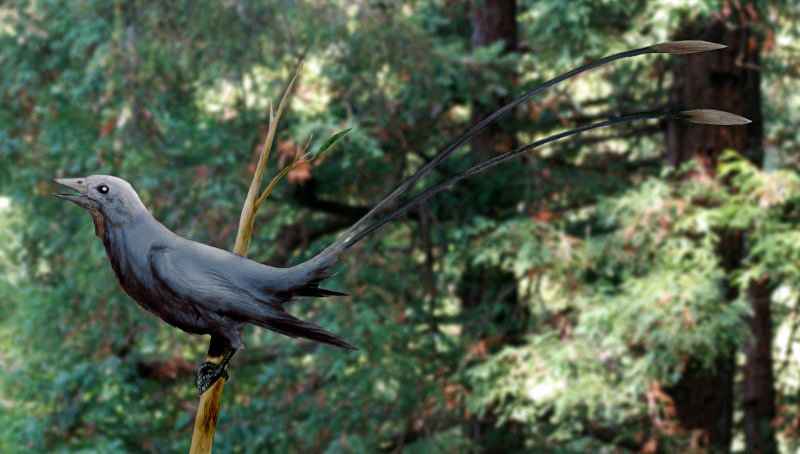
- Life restoration

Scientific classification
- Kingdom: Animalia
- Phylum: Chordata
- Class: Reptilia
- Clade: Dinosauria
- Clade: Saurischia
- Clade: Theropoda
- Clade: Avialae
- Clade: †Confuciusornithes
- Clade: †Confuciusornithiformes
- Genus: †Eoconfuciusornis; Zhang, Zhou & Benton, 2008
- Species: †E. zhengi

Binomial name
- †Eoconfuciusornis zhengi Zhang, Zhou & Benton, 2008

= Eoconfuciusornis =

Eoconfuciusornis Temporal range: Early Cretaceous, 131 Ma

Extinct genus of birds

Eoconfuciusornis a genus of extinct avialan that lived 131 Ma ago, in the Early Cretaceous of China. It is the oldest known bird to have a beak.

The type species of Eoconfuciusornis, Eoconfuciusornis zhengi, was named and described by Fucheng Zhang, Zhou Zhonghe and Michael Benton in 2008. The generic name combines a Greek ἠώς, eos, "dawn", with the name of the related genus Confuciusornis. The specific name honours Zheng Guangmei.

The holotype, specimen IVPP V11977, was found near Sichakou in Fengning in Hebei province. Its provenance the Sichakou Beds are part of the Dabeigou Formation which was seen by the describers as dating to the Hauterivian, and were thought to be about 131 million years old. The specimen consists of a compressed skeleton that is relatively complete and shows well conserved remains of most of the feathering.

Eoconfuciusornis was somewhat smaller than Confuciusornis, but otherwise very similar with a pointed toothless beak. Compared to the latter it had longer legs and lacked a pierced deltopectoral crest on the humerus.

Eoconfuciusornis was assigned to the Confuciusornithidae. It would have been the most basal species known of that group, as reflected by the generic name and in conformation to the age ascribed to it, about six million years older than the specimens of Confuciusornis.

Feathers making up the wing coverts, nape, and tail were black, and a dark spotted pattern can be spotted on the secondary remiges. Feathers on the hindlimb and top of the head were grey, while those on the throat were brown.

== See also ==
- Dinosaur coloration
