= Sangyuan, Sichuan =

Sangyuan 桑园镇
- Town
- Location in Sichuan
- Coordinates: 30°28′38″N 103°27′31″E
- Country: People's Republic of China
- Province: Sichuan
- Prefecture-level city: Chengdu
- County-level city: Qionglai City
- Time zone: UTC+8 (China Standard)

Sangyuan (simplified Chinese: 桑园; traditional Chinese: 桑園; pinyin: Sāngyuán) is a town in Qionglai City, in Sichuan province, China. As of 2018, it has one residential community and eight villages under its administration.

== See also ==
- List of township-level divisions of Sichuan
