= Shangyuan Subdistrict =

Shangyuan Subdistrict 上园街道
- Subdistrict
- Location in Liaoning
- Coordinates: 41°49′55″N 123°28′54″E
- Country: People's Republic of China
- Province: Liaoning
- Prefecture-level city: Shenyang
- District: Dadong District
- Time zone: UTC+8 (China Standard)

Shangyuan Subdistrict (Chinese: 上园街道; pinyin: Shàngyuán Jiēdào) is a subdistrict in Dadong District, Shenyang, Liaoning province, China. As of 2020, it has 13 residential communities under its administration.

- Shangyuan Community
- Chenyu Community (辰宇社区)
- Huacheng Community (华诚社区)
- Gaojiao Community (高教社区)
- Qiancao Community (浅草社区)
- Kangdu Community (康都社区)
- Xinhua Community (新华社区)
- Shengtaosha Community (圣淘沙社区)
- Yuanjing Community (愿景社区)
- Weishi Community (卫士社区)
- Kuangbei Community (矿北社区)
- Licheng Community (俪城社区)
- Dongfang Community (东方社区)

== See also ==
- List of township-level divisions of Liaoning
