= Sangyuan, Shaanxi =

Sangyuan 桑园镇
- Town
- Location in China
- Coordinates: 33°2′43″N 107°37′36″E
- Country: People's Republic of China
- Province: Shaanxi
- Prefecture-level city: Hanzhong
- County: Xixiang County
- Time zone: UTC+8 (China Standard)

Sangyuan (simplified Chinese: 桑园; traditional Chinese: 桑園; pinyin: Sāngyuán) is a town under the administration of Xixiang County in Shaanxi, China. As of 2018, it has one residential community and eight villages under its administration.
