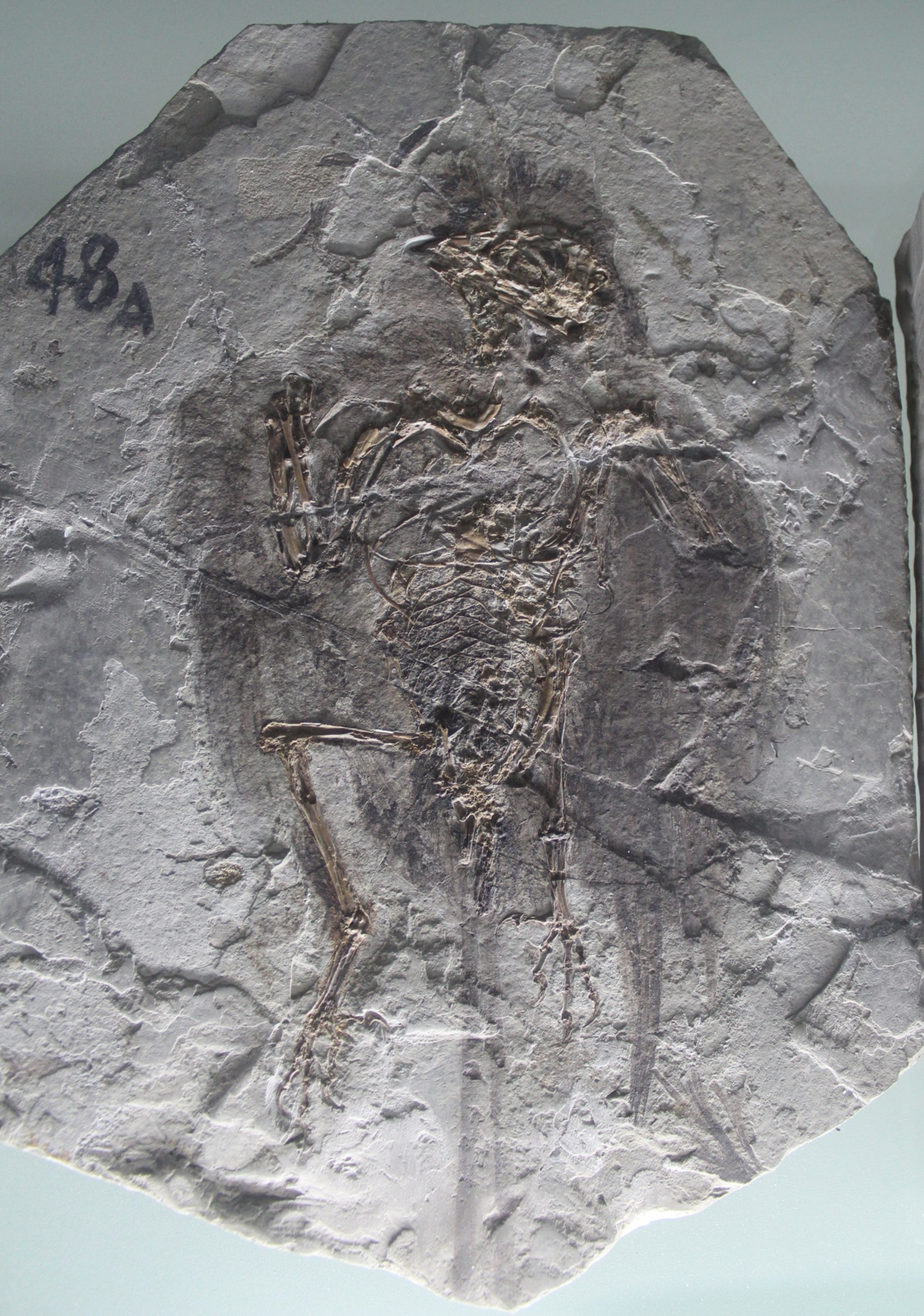
- Holotype specimen, Geological Museum of China

Scientific classification
- Kingdom: Animalia
- Phylum: Chordata
- Class: Reptilia
- Clade: Dinosauria
- Clade: Saurischia
- Clade: Theropoda
- Clade: Avialae
- Clade: †Confuciusornithiformes
- Family: †Confuciusornithidae
- Genus: †Changchengornis; Q. Ji, Chiappe & S. Ji, 1999
- Species: †C. hengdaoziensis

Binomial name
- †Changchengornis hengdaoziensis Q. Ji, Chiappe & S. Ji, 1999

= Changchengornis =

Changchengornis Temporal range: Early Cretaceous, 124.6 Ma

Extinct genus of birds

Changchengornis is an extinct basal pygostylian genus from the Early Cretaceous. Its remains have been found in the People's Republic of China, in Chaomidianzi Formation rocks from around the Barremian-Aptian boundary, deposited 125 million years ago. Changchengornis was a close relative of the better-known Confuciusornis. In 1999 it was assigned to the Confuciusornithidae.

The more pointed bill of Changchengornis might indicate a diet different from that of Confuciusornis. However, of Confuciusornis itself it is contested whether it were a fish eater, an omnivore, or a seed eater.

== Discovery ==
In 1998 Ji Shuan and Luis Chiappe discovered among the many specimens of the National Geological Museum of China at Beijing assigned to Confuciusornis, an exemplar that seemed somewhat different. Subsequent preparation by the American Museum of Natural History showed that it indeed was a separate species, new to science.

In 1999 Ji, Chiappe and Ji Qiang named the type species and only species of Changchengornis: Changchengornis hengdaoziensis. The generic name refers to the Great Wall of China, changcheng, and combines this with a Greek ὄρνις, ornis, "bird". The specific name refers to the geological Hengdaozi Member.

The holotype specimen, GMV-2129, was found near the village of Jianshangou in Liaoning province, in the Jianshangou Beds of the Hengdaozi Member of the Yixian Formation, at the time seen as a separate Chaomidianzi Formation. It consists of a plate and counterplate, GMV-2129a/b, showing a largely complete and articulated but compressed and somewhat damaged skeleton. Much of the feathering has been preserved in an excellent state of preservation.

== Description ==
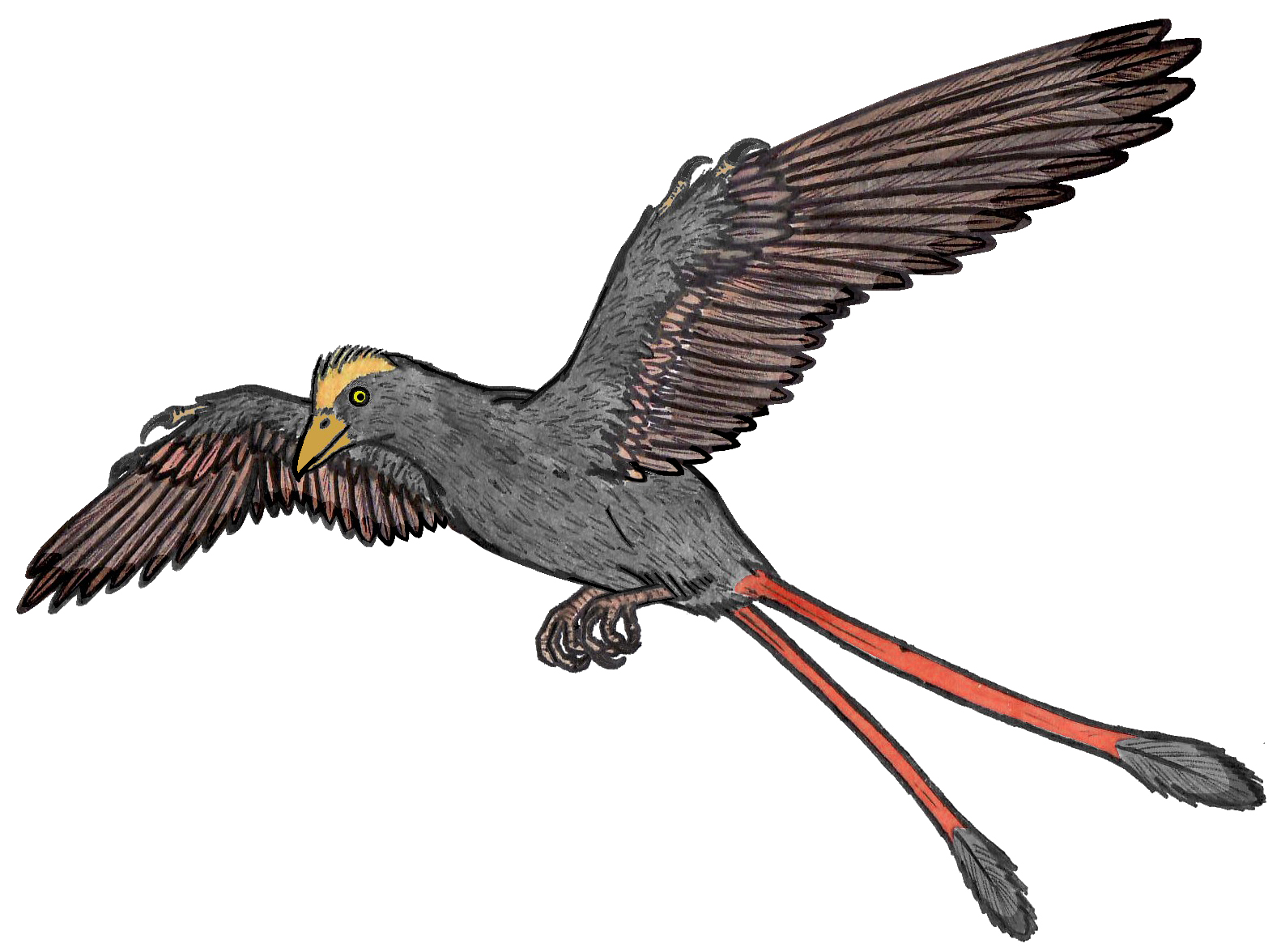
Life restoration

Changchengornis resembles its relative Confuciusornis. The type specimen is rather small, smaller than the smallest known specimens of Confuciusornis. Compared to the latter, Changchengornis had a beak that was more pointed, slightly hooked at the tip, proportionally shorter, and higher at the back. The deltopectoral crest of the humerus is not pierced. GMV-2129 also shows two elongated, ribbon-like tail feathers as found in some specimens of Confuciusornis, that are often considered to be the males. Also, the fossil gives the impression of a head tuft or crest being present; if so, the outline of its head must have borne an uncanny resemblance to today's Tauraco or turacos in general but it could also be an artefact of conservation.
