= Shangyuan, Beipiao =

Shangyuan 上园镇
- Town
- Location in Liaoning
- Coordinates: 41°36′37″N 120°58′45″E
- Country: People's Republic of China
- Province: Liaoning
- Prefecture-level city: Chaoyang
- County-level city: Beipiao
- Time zone: UTC+8 (China Standard)

Shangyuan (Chinese: 上园; pinyin: Shàngyuán) is a town in Beipiao, in Liaoning province, China. As of 2020, it has 11 villages under its administration.

- Shangyuan Village
- Chaoyangsi Village (朝阳寺村)
- Goukouzi Village (沟口子村)
- Wangdaoying Village (王道营村)
- Sanjuxing Village (三巨兴村)
- Tubaoying Village (土宝营村)
- Kaoshantun Village (靠山屯村)
- Chaomidian Village (炒米甸村)
- Xiaobeigou Village (小北沟村)
- Zhangbaotu Village (张宝吐村)
- Madaigou Village (马代沟村)
