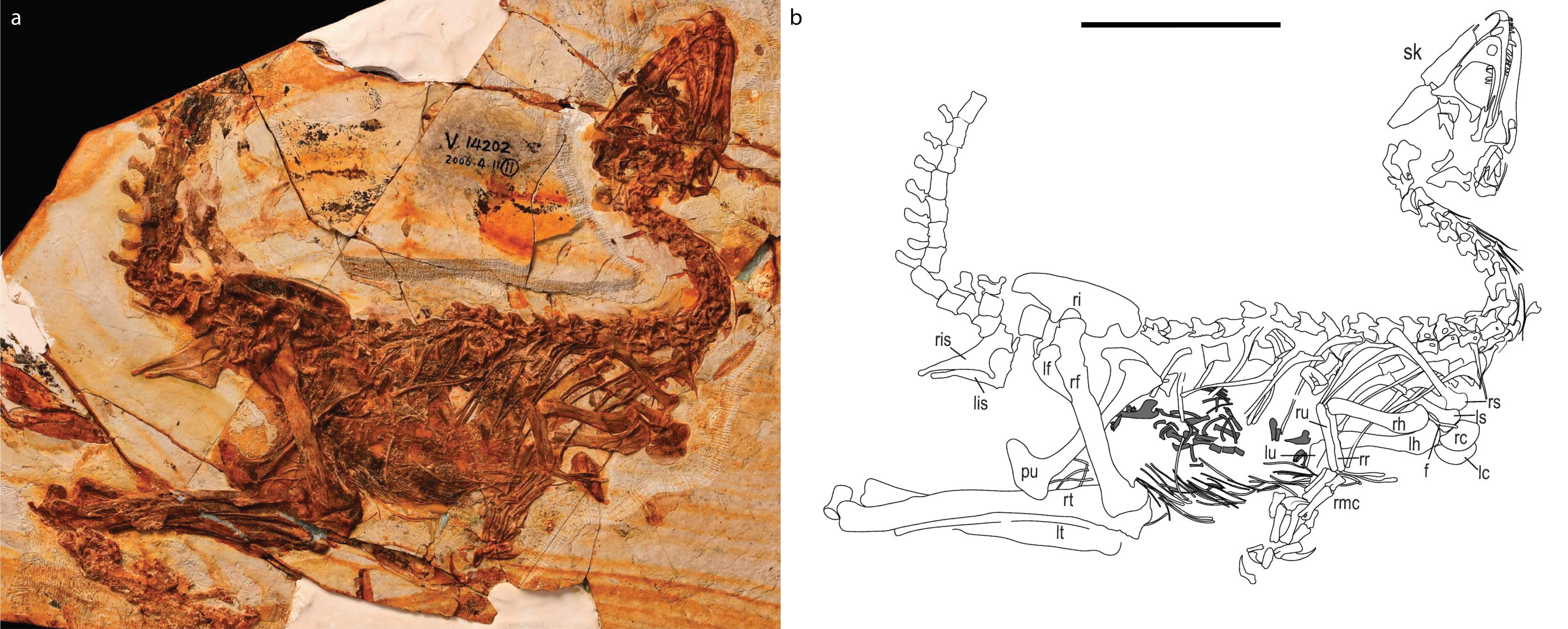
- Photograph (a) and line drawing (b) of the holotype specimen

Scientific classification
- Kingdom: Animalia
- Phylum: Chordata
- Class: Reptilia
- Clade: Dinosauria
- Clade: Saurischia
- Clade: Theropoda
- Family: †Sinosauropterygidae
- Genus: †Huadanosaurus; Qiu et al., 2025
- Species: †H. sinensis

Binomial name
- †Huadanosaurus sinensis Qiu et al., 2025

= Huadanosaurus =

Huadanosaurus Temporal range: Early Cretaceous (Barremian), 124.12 Ma

Genus of theropod dinosaurs

Huadanosaurus is an extinct genus of compsognathid-like theropod dinosaurs from the Early Cretaceous Yixian Formation of China. The genus contains a single species, H. sinensis, known from a nearly complete skeleton preserving feather-like structures.

== Discovery and naming ==
The Huadanosaurus holotype specimen, IVPP V14202, was discovered in outcrops of the Yixian Formation (Dawangzhangzi bed) in Lingyuan of Liaoning Province, China. The specimen consists of a nearly complete skeleton preserved on a slab, missing the feet and the end of the tail. Filamentous integument is preserved around the tail. Prior to its description, the specimen was attributed to the related genus Sinosauropteryx.

In 2025, Qiu et al. described Huadanosaurus sinensis as a new genus and species of sinosauropterygid theropods based on these fossil remains. The generic name, Huadanosaurus, combines "Huadan"—a Chinese word referring to the birthday of a great person or institution—with the Ancient Greek σαῦρος (sauros), meaning "lizard". This honors the 70th anniversary of the founding of the Academic Divisions of the Chinese Academy of Sciences (CASAD). The specific name, sinensis, is derived from the Latin word sina, which refers to China.

== Description ==
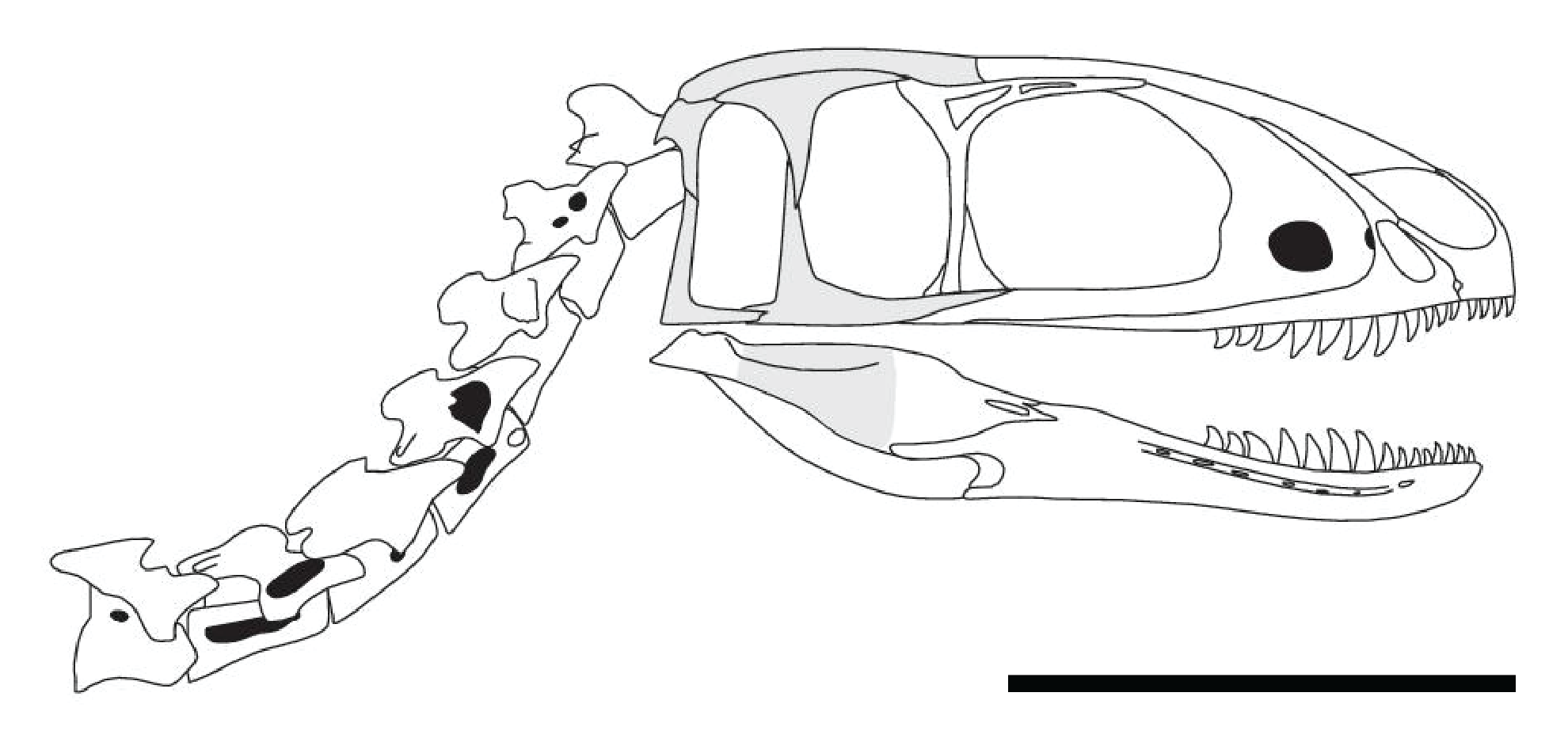
Reconstruction of the head and neck

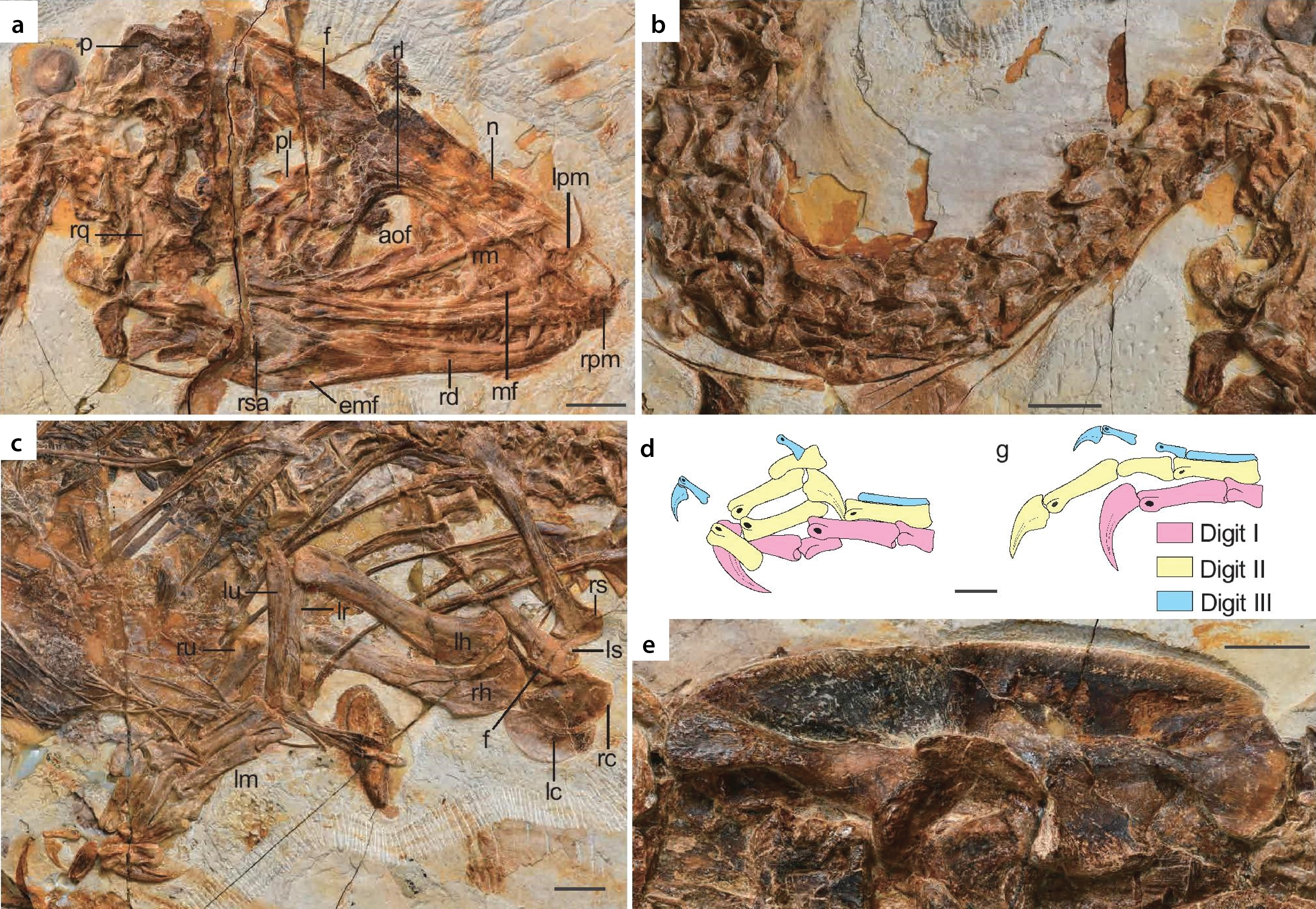
Details of the holotype

Qiu et al. (2025) identified the Huadanosaurus holotype as belonging to a probable immature individual based on the unfused vertebral neurocentral sutures and scarred bone surfaces. Furthermore, its skull, measuring 10.1 cm (4.0 in) long, is fairly large in relation to the rest of the body. The holotype individual is around 1 metre (3.3 ft) long.

Compared to other compsognathid-like theropods, the Huadanosaurus holotype preserves several anatomical characteristics of the skull, teeth, and ilium that are similar to tyrannosauroids. Some of these may suggest that Huadanosaurus had a stronger bite force than its relatives. For example, there is a prominent surangular shelf on the lower jaw, indicating a strong adductor muscle for closing the jaws. The generally deep skull and mandible, as well as the fused nasal, are all adaptations towards resisting high levels of biting stress. However, Qiu et al. interpret these features as convergent with the tyrannosauroid lineage, rather than indicative of a placement within that clade.

A later comment by paleontologist Christophe Hendrickx suggested additional careful research on Huadanosaurus and other Jehol 'compsognathids' may support their reidentification as juvenile forms of larger contemporary tyrannosauroids known from mature specimens, such as Yutyrannus and Sinotyrannus.

=== Colouration ===
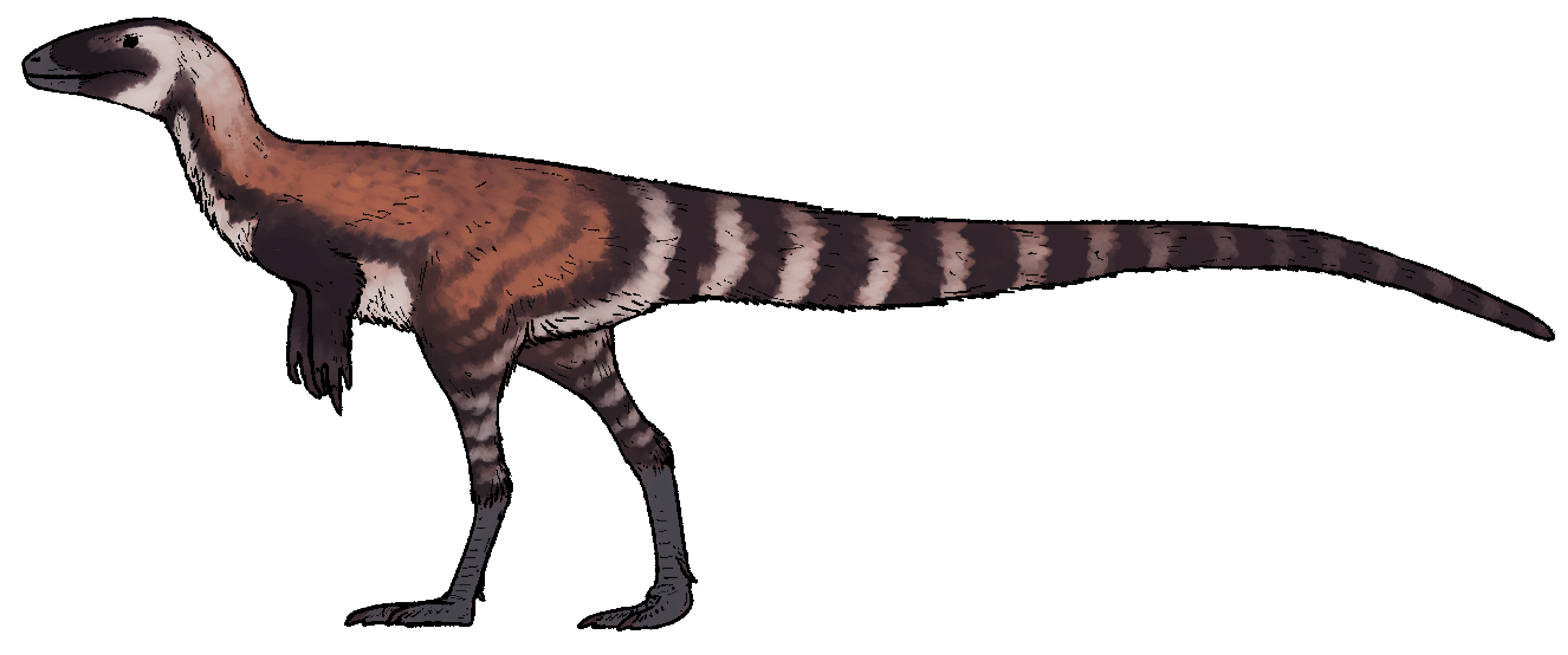
Speculative life restoration based on preserved melanosomes and color patterns of Sinosauropteryx specimens

In 2010, Fucheng Zhang and colleagues examined the fossilized feathers of several dinosaurs and early birds. They found evidence that the specimens preserved melanosomes, a type of cell organelle that stores biological pigments and give the feathers of modern birds their colour. The researchers further compared the observed melanosome structures to those of modern birds to determine a general range of colour. Among the specimens studied was the Huadanosaurus holotype (then provisionally referred to Sinosauropteryx). They observed the presence of spherical phaeomelanosomes in this specimen, which can be correlated with chestnut to rufous color tones, suggesting that at least parts of the animal were covered in reddish-brown feather-like filaments.

== Classification ==
Huadanosaurus is similar to several dinosaurs historically called the Compsognathidae. However, a 2024 analysis by Andrea Cau proposed that these taxa did not form a natural monophyletic clade and that some are juveniles of larger tetanurans. To test this hypothesis, Qiu et al. (2025) scored Huadanosaurus in Cau's "Ontogenetic State Partitioning" (OSP) phylogenetic matrix and the more traditional "Theropod Working Group" (TWiG) matrix. Both phylogenetic analyses found support for a natural group of all Jehol Biota (Early Cretaceous) compsognathid-like theropods (Sinosauropteryx spp., Huaxiagnathus, and Sinocalliopteryx) as well as the Brazilian Mirischia. Using the OSP matrix, Huadanosaurus was recovered as the sister taxon to Mirischia and Sinocalliopteryx. Since Compsognathus was recovered outside of this group, Qiu et al. opted to use the name Sinosauropterygidae for this group. These results are displayed in Topology A below. Using the TWiG matrix, Huadanosaurus was found to be the sister to the group formed by Compsognathus and Sinosauropteryx spp., as shown in Topology B below.

Topology A: OSP dataset

- Coelurosauria
  - Sinosauropterygidae
    - - Sinosauropteryx lingyuanensis
      - Sinosauropteryx prima
    - - Huaxiagnathus orientalis
      - - Huadanosaurus sinensis
        - - Mirischia asymmetrica
          - Sinocalliopteryx gigas
  - - Tyrannosauroidea
    - Maniraptora

Topology B: TWiG dataset

- Coelurosauria
  - Zuolong
  - - Tyrannosauroidea
    - - Tugulusaurus
      - - Sinosauropterygidae
          - - Mirischia asymmetrica
            - - Huaxiagnathus orientalis
              - Sinocalliopteryx gigas
          - - Juravenator starki
            - - Huadanosaurus sinensis
              - - Compsognathus longipes
                - - Sinosauropteryx lingyuanensis
                  - Sinosauropteryx prima
        - - - Ornithomimosauria
            - Maniraptora

== Paleobiology ==
Several fragments of mammal bones, including eutherians and eutriconodonts, were found in the abdominal cavity region of Huadanosaurus. Based on the disarticulated but associated, well-preserved condition of the mammal remains, the individuals were likely swallowed whole. This further implies that Huadanosaurus individuals were incapable of firmly grasping with their hands to tear or bite prey items. Most Mesozoic mammals were likely nocturnal, suggesting Huadanosaurus was as well.
