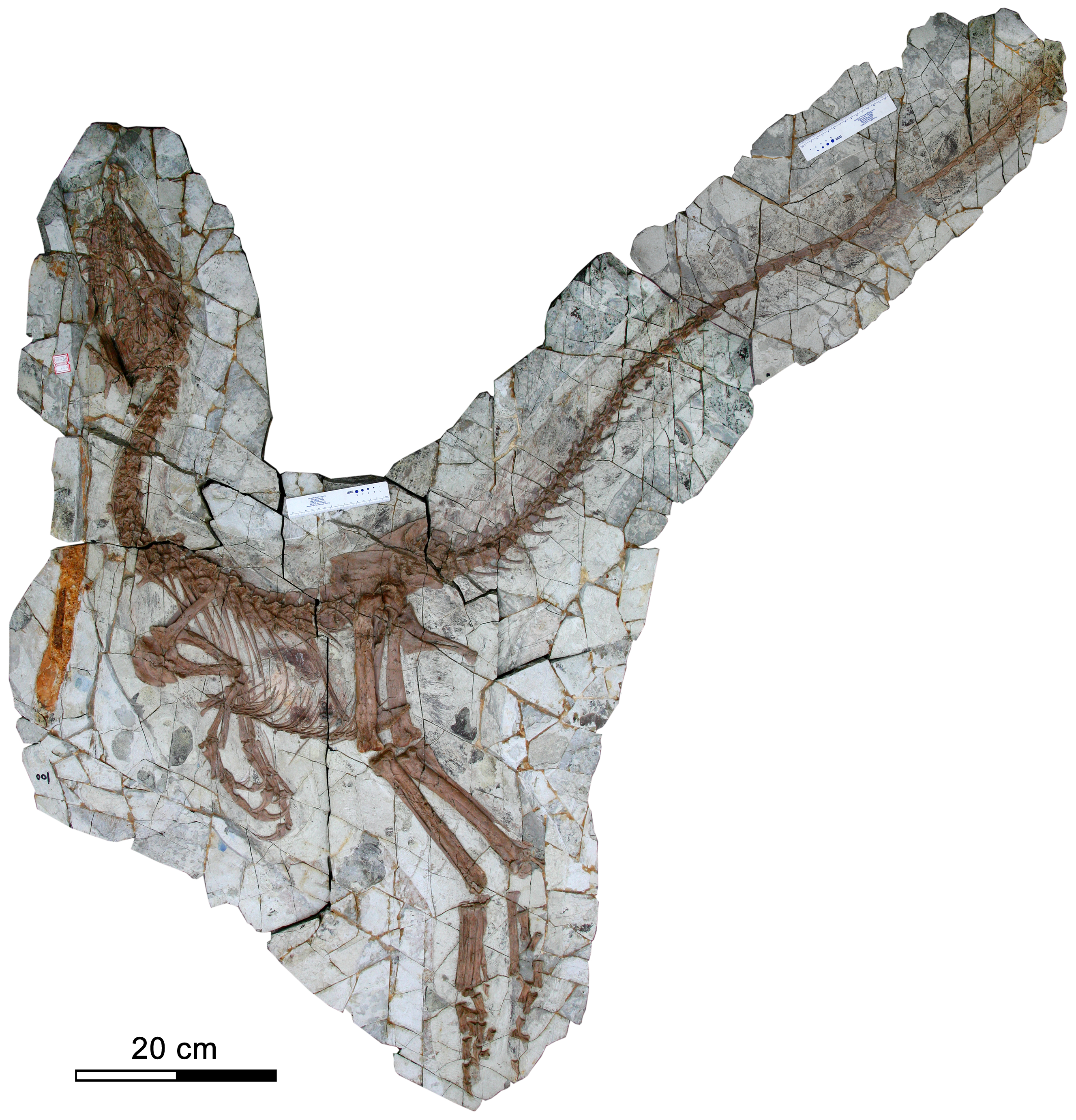
- Holotype specimen JMP-V-05-8-01

Scientific classification
- Kingdom: Animalia
- Phylum: Chordata
- Class: Reptilia
- Clade: Dinosauria
- Clade: Saurischia
- Clade: Theropoda
- Family: †Compsognathidae
- Genus: †Sinocalliopteryx; Ji et al., 2007
- Species: †S. gigas

Binomial name
- †Sinocalliopteryx gigas Ji et al., 2007

= Sinocalliopteryx =

Sinocalliopteryx Temporal range: Early Cretaceous, 125.46 Ma

Extinct genus of dinosaurs

Sinocalliopteryx (meaning 'Chinese beautiful feather') is a genus of carnivorous coelurosaurian theropod dinosaurs from the Lower Cretaceous Yixian Formation of China (Jianshangou Beds, dating to 124.6 Ma). While similar to the related Huaxiagnathus, Sinocalliopteryx were larger. In 2007, the type specimen was the largest known compsognathid exemplar, at 2.37 metres (7.8 ft) in length. In 2012, an even larger specimen was reported.

== Discovery ==
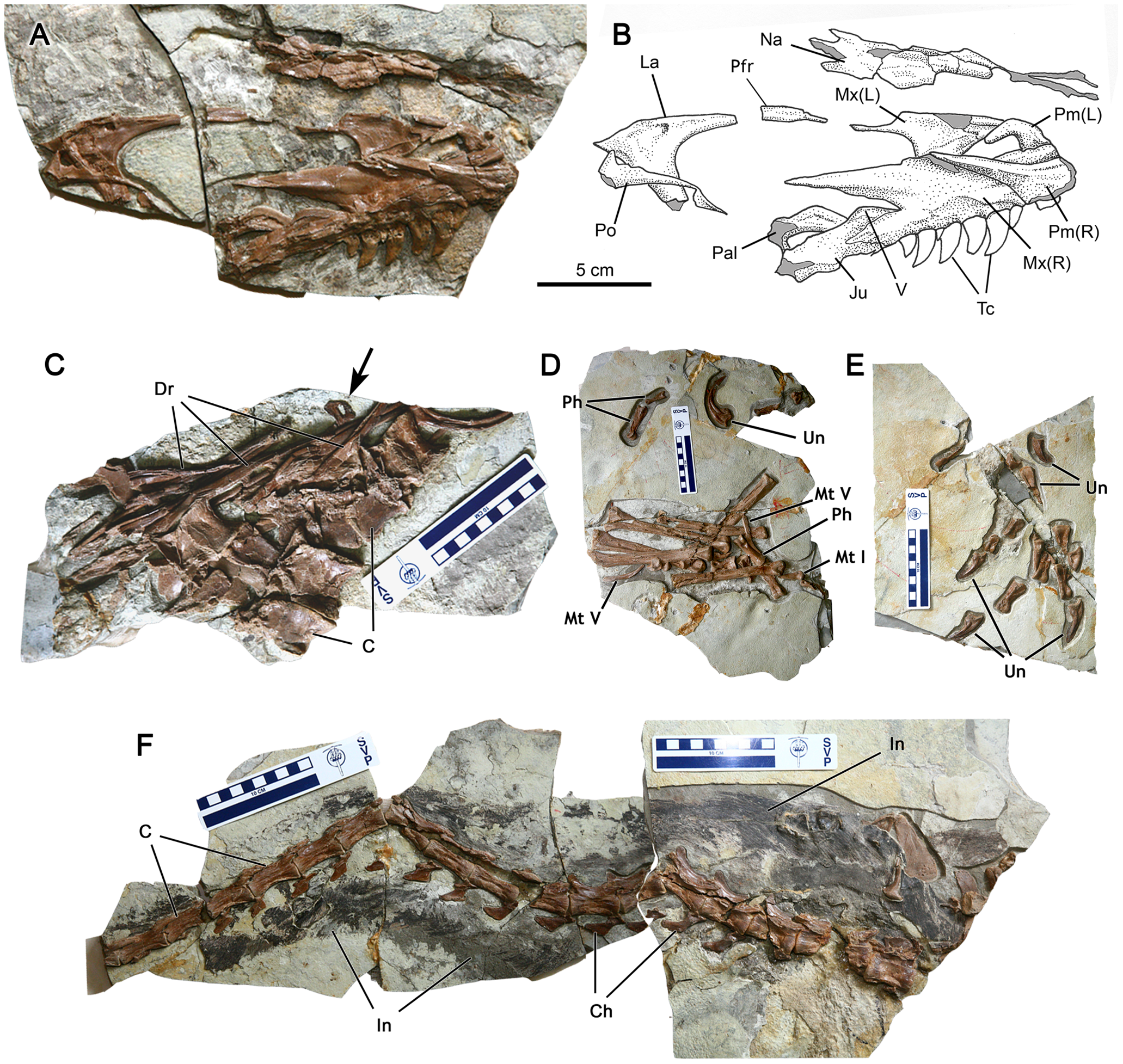
Assigned specimen CAGS-IG-T1

The type species Sinocalliopteryx gigas was named and described in 2007 by Ji Shu'an, Ji Qiang, Lü Junchang and Yuan Chongxi. The generic name is derived from Sinae, Latin for the Chinese and Greek καλός, kalos, "beautiful", and πτέρυξ, pteryx, "feather". The large size of this "giant compsognathid" lent Sinocalliopteryx its specific name, gigas, meaning 'giant'.

The holotype, JMP-V-05-8-01, was discovered at Hengdaozi, in Sihetun, in Liaoning Province, from the Jianshangou Beds of the Yixian Formation dating from the Barremian-Aptian, about 125 million years old. It consists of a nearly complete skeleton with skull, compressed on a single plate, of an adult individual. Extensive remains of protofeathers have been preserved. In 2012 a second specimen was described, CAGS-IG-T1, of an individual larger than the holotype. The skull was about 10% longer, the feet about a third, a difference explained by positive allometry. The specimen consists of a partial skull, tail, hands, feet and ribcage. It shows filaments on the tail.

== Description ==
Sinocalliopteryx was a bipedal predator. The preserved length of the holotype specimen is 237 centimetres. Its weight was estimated by Gregory S. Paul in 2010 at twenty kilogrammes. Sinocalliopteryx is distinguished from Huaxiagnathus, as well as other compsognathids, by its relatively long hands in relation to its arms. The arms and hindlimbs were also longer overall than in other compsognathids, a feature possibly related to its size.

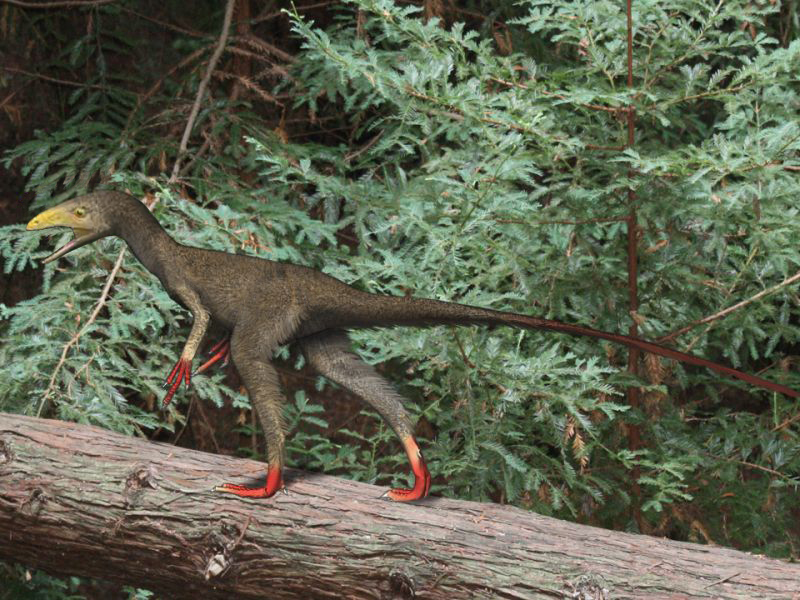
Life restoration

Sinocalliopteryx had an elongated head with a pointed snout, showing a convex upper profile. There were four teeth in the premaxilla which were small but exceptionally had denticles on their front edges. Only six, larger, teeth were present in the maxilla of the holotype specimen but the number of its tooth positions could not be adequately determined. Specimen CAGS-IG-T1 preserves ten maxillary tooth sockets with room for one or two more in damaged areas. The jugal was a strongly built element with a high-rising front branch that formed part of the lower front edge of the eye socket. The lower jaw lacked an opening in its outer side.

The vertebral column consisted of eleven cervical, twelve dorsal, five sacral and at least forty-nine caudal vertebrae. The point of the tail is missing. In the tail, the spines and chevrons strongly inclined to the back. The gastralia had very short lateral segments.

The arm had a short humerus and also the lower arm was short and elegant with an ulna showing only a weakly developed olecranon process on its back upper end. The hand was very elongated though, as long as the ulna and upper arm combined. The second metacarpal was expanded at the top at the side of the first metacarpal, making the entire metacarpus more compact. The second claw was elongated, as long as the thumb claw. The third metacarpal was rather short and carried a thin, third, finger.

In the pelvis there was a little notch in the front edge of the ilium. The relatively long shaft of the ischium curved downwards. The hindlimb was elongated, largely because of a long lower leg, having 90% of the length of the thighbone. The foot was also long, especially in the metatarsus.

Like many other theropods of the Yixian Formation, Sinocalliopteryx was preserved with "protofeathers," simple filamentous integument (hairlike structures covering the skin), very similar to that found in Sinosauropteryx. The integument of Sinocalliopteryx differ in length across the body, with the longest protofeathers covering the hips, base of the tail, and back of the thighs. These longest protofeathers measured up to ten centimeters (4 in) in length. Protofeathers were also found on the metatarsus (upper part of the foot). While these were not nearly as long or modern as the corresponding feathers of "four-winged" dinosaurs such as Microraptor and Pedopenna, they do indicate that foot-feathers or similar structures first arose in dinosaurs much more basal or "primitive" than previously known.

== Classification ==
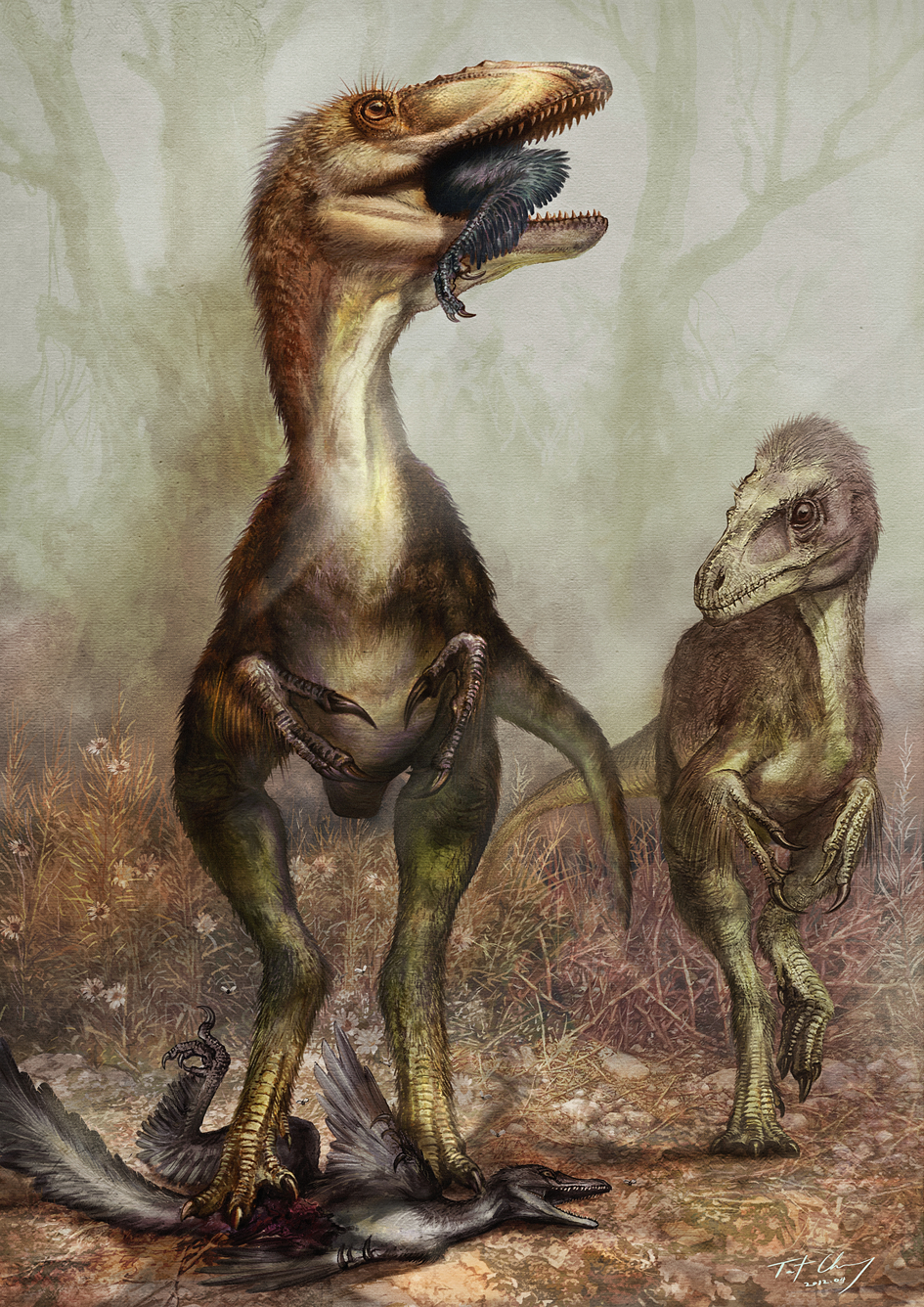
Sinocalliopteryx feeding on Sinornithosaurus

Sinocalliopteryx was by its describers assigned to the Compsognathidae.

This cladogram shows the position of Sinocalliopteryx in the Compsognathidae according to a study by dal Sasso & Maganuco in 2011:

- Tyrannoraptora
  - Tyrannosauroidea
  - - Compsognathidae
      - - Scipionyx
        - Orkoraptor
      - - Sinocalliopteryx
        - - Compsognathus
          - - Huaxiagnathus
            - - Sinosauropteryx
              - Juravenator
    - Maniraptoriformes

The large size of Sinocalliopteryx compared to its relatives is also notable, and may indicate a trend towards large size among compsognathids (a group well known for their small size compared to other, giant theropod dinosaurs), similar to the trends towards larger sizes in other dinosaurian lineages.

In 2024, Andrea Cau published a study on the phylogenetics of Compsognathids that called the assessment of Sinocalliopteryx into question. The paper recovered the taxon, along with four other proposed Compsognathids in a polytomy within basal Coelurosauria. This polytomy notably did not include Composognathus proper, which would make none of these species Compsognathids.

Qiu et al. (2025) also argued against the monophyly of Compsognathidae and revised the definition of the monophyletic Sinosauropterygidae within Coelurosauria as a family containing all compsognathid-like theropods from the Jehol Biota of China: Sinosauropteryx, Huadanosaurus, Huaxiagnathus and Sinocalliopteryx. Their phylogenetic analyses are reproduced below:

Topology A: OSP dataset

- - Sinosauropterygidae
    - - Sinosauropteryx lingyuanensis
      - Sinosauropteryx prima
    - - Huaxiagnathus orientalis
      - - Huadanosaurus sinensis
        - - Mirischia asymmetrica
          - Sinocalliopteryx gigas
  - - Tyrannosauroidea
    - Other maniraptoriforms

Topology B: TWiG dataset

- - Tyrannosauroidea
  - - Sinosauropterygidae
      - - Mirischia asymmetrica
        - - Huaxiagnathus orientalis
          - Sinocalliopteryx gigas
      - - Juravenator starki
        - - Huadanosaurus sinensis
          - - Compsognathus longipes
            - - Sinosauropteryx lingyuanensis
              - Sinosauropteryx prima
    - - Other maniraptoriforms

== Paleobiology ==
=== Diet and feeding ===
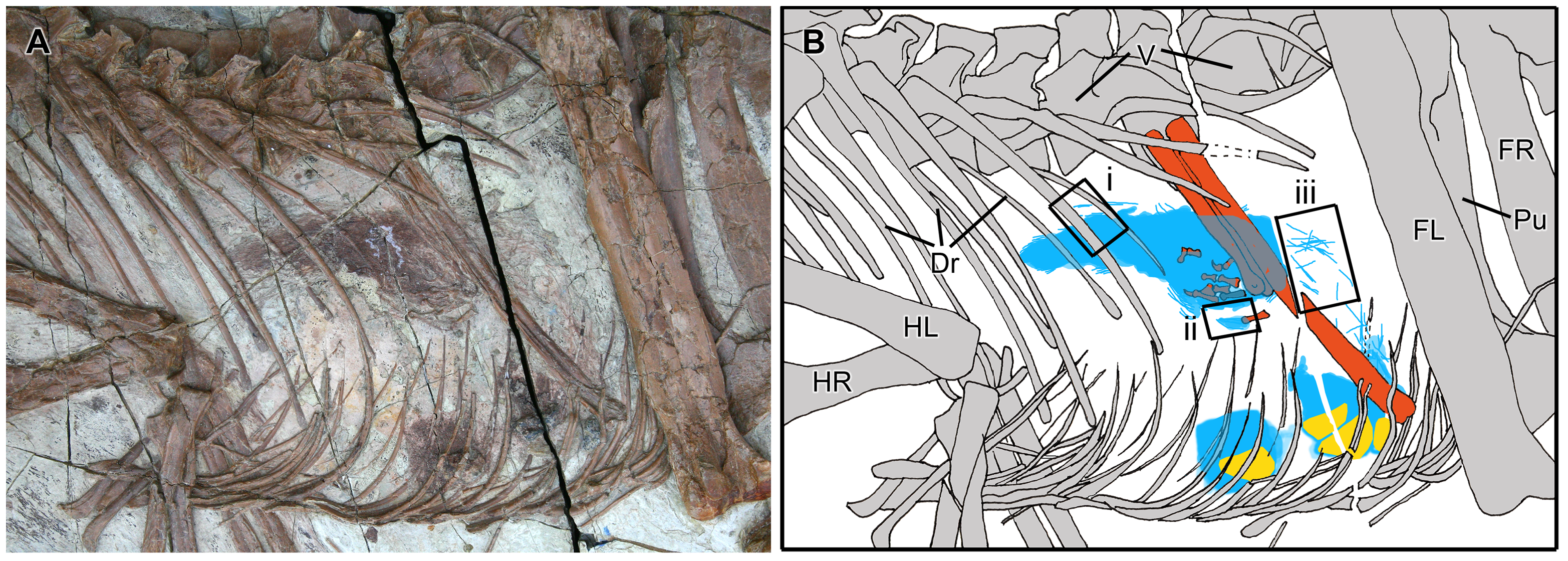
Abdominal contents of the holotype

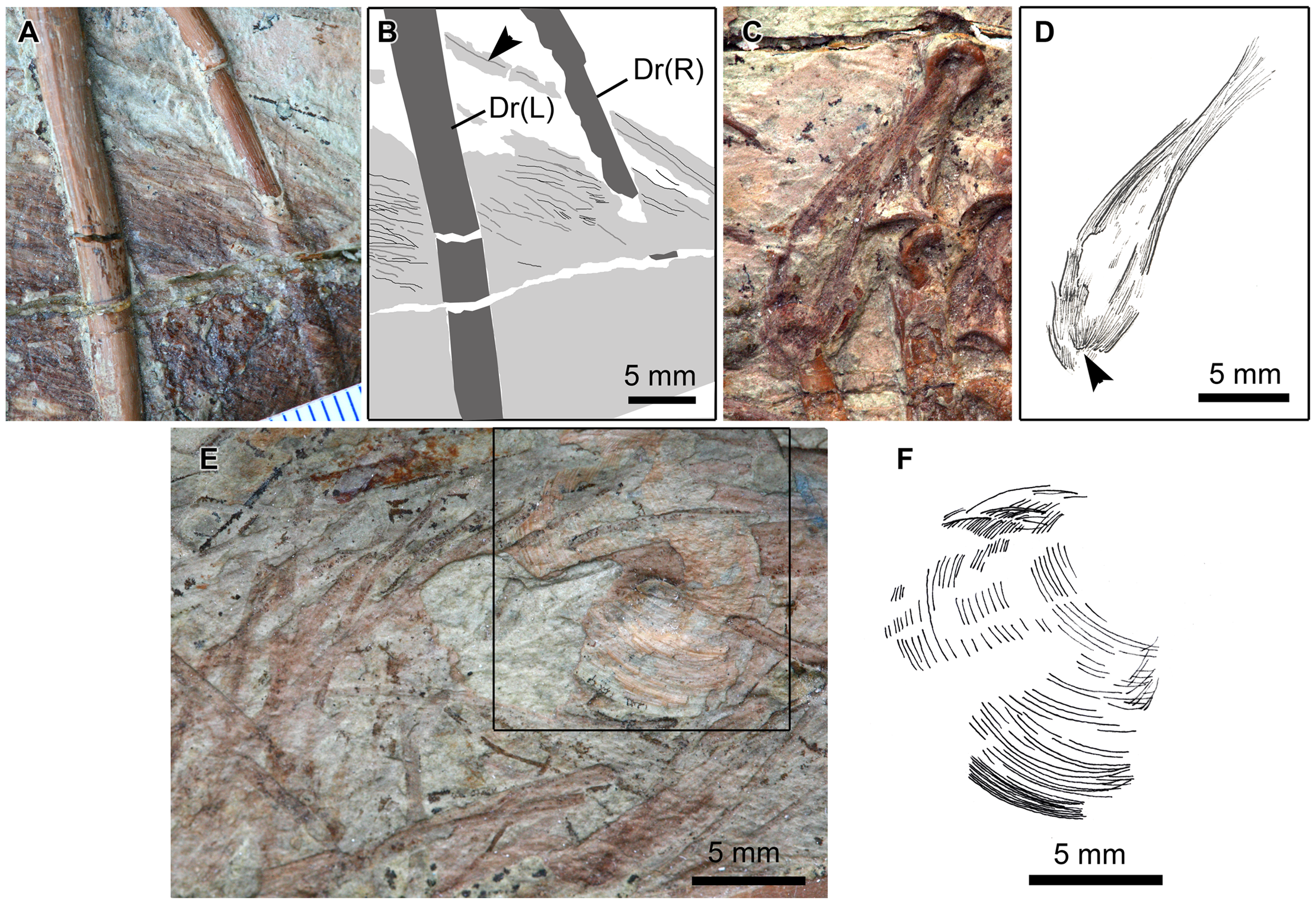
Undigested integument within the abdominal cavity of the holotype

The well-preserved skeleton of the Sinocalliopteryx holotype contained the partial leg of a dromaeosaurid within the abdominal cavity, comprising a complete lower leg and foot with toes and claws in their natural, articulated position. While the leg part, about one foot long, is very large in relation to the abdominal cavity, it is clearly situated within it, lying between the ribs. Ji and colleagues in 2007 suggested that this could indicate it preyed upon the smaller, bird-like dinosaur. This discovery indicated that Sinocalliopteryx may have been an agile, active, "fierce" predator, especially since other compsognathids have been found with (presumably fast-moving) lizards and small mammals in their abdominal cavities. In 2012 the dromaeosaurid was tentatively identified as an individual of Sinornithosaurus with a length of 1.2 metres (3.9 ft). The 2012 study also reported newly discovered remains of prey animals. Above the dromaeosaurid leg, feathers are visible. Below it two clusters of digested food can be seen. It was suggested that the feathers had belonged to a bird and were with the leg still present in the stomach. The digested food would, using the preserved digestive tract of Scipionyx as a reference, have been positioned in the duodenum. The C-shaped abdominal contents of this specimen appear to reflect of the original contour of the digestive tract.

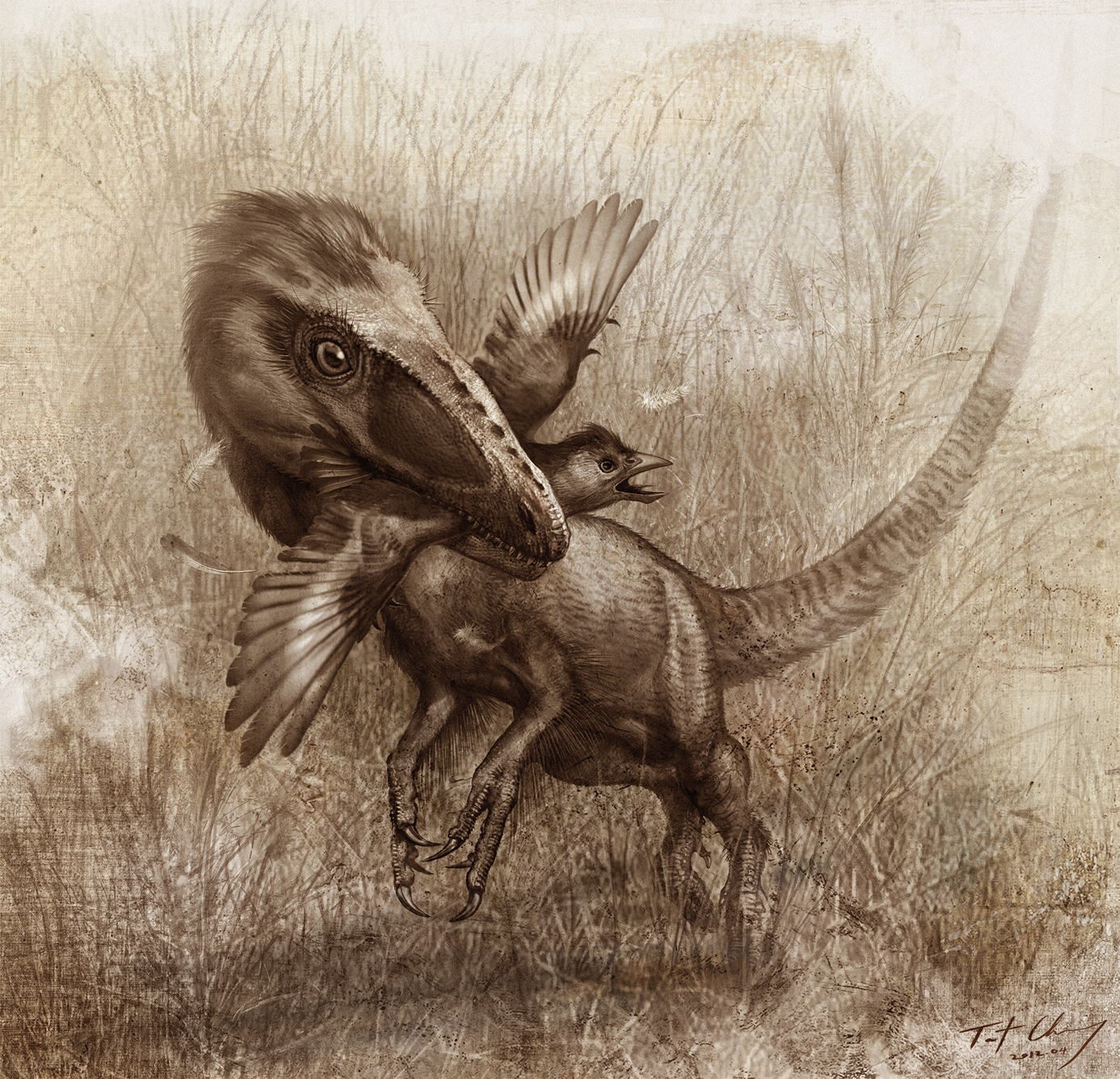
Sinocalliopteryx feeding on Confuciusornis

In addition to the dromaeosaurid leg, four irregularly-shaped stones with a diameter between fifteen and twenty millimetres were found in the abdomen, with no similar stones present in any other portions of the skeleton or embedded in the surrounding rock. The authors interpreted these as gastroliths (gizzard stones) similar to those found with Nqwebasaurus and Baryonyx. Other theropods, such as Caudipteryx and a Mongolian ornithomimid, were also found with gastroliths, though in those cases the stones were much more numerous and smaller in size. Ji and colleagues speculated that, since the later two dinosaurs were probably primarily herbivores, the number and size of gastroliths may correspond with diet; that is, herbivores ingested many small stones, while carnivores ingested only a few larger stones to aid in digestion. However, the 2012 study could find no gastroliths with the second specimen and therefore concluded that the stones with the holotype were swallowed by accident. In any case no special gizzard would have been present.

The second specimen, CAGS-IG-T1, also preserves the remains of several meals. Disarticulated bones were found, in front of the lower ischia, identified as belonging to at least two individuals of Confuciusornis sanctus, a basal bird that is very common in the formation. Also a 13.5 centimetres long scapula was discovered, belonging to some 1.5 metres (4.9 ft) long herbivorous ornithischian, perhaps Yueosaurus or a Psittacosaurus species. The bone surface of the scapula looked as if it had been etched by stomach acid for about thirteen days, leading to the conclusion the birds were swallowed later and in quick succession. This again would indicate a high metabolism for Sinocalliopteryx, necessitating a regular food intake.

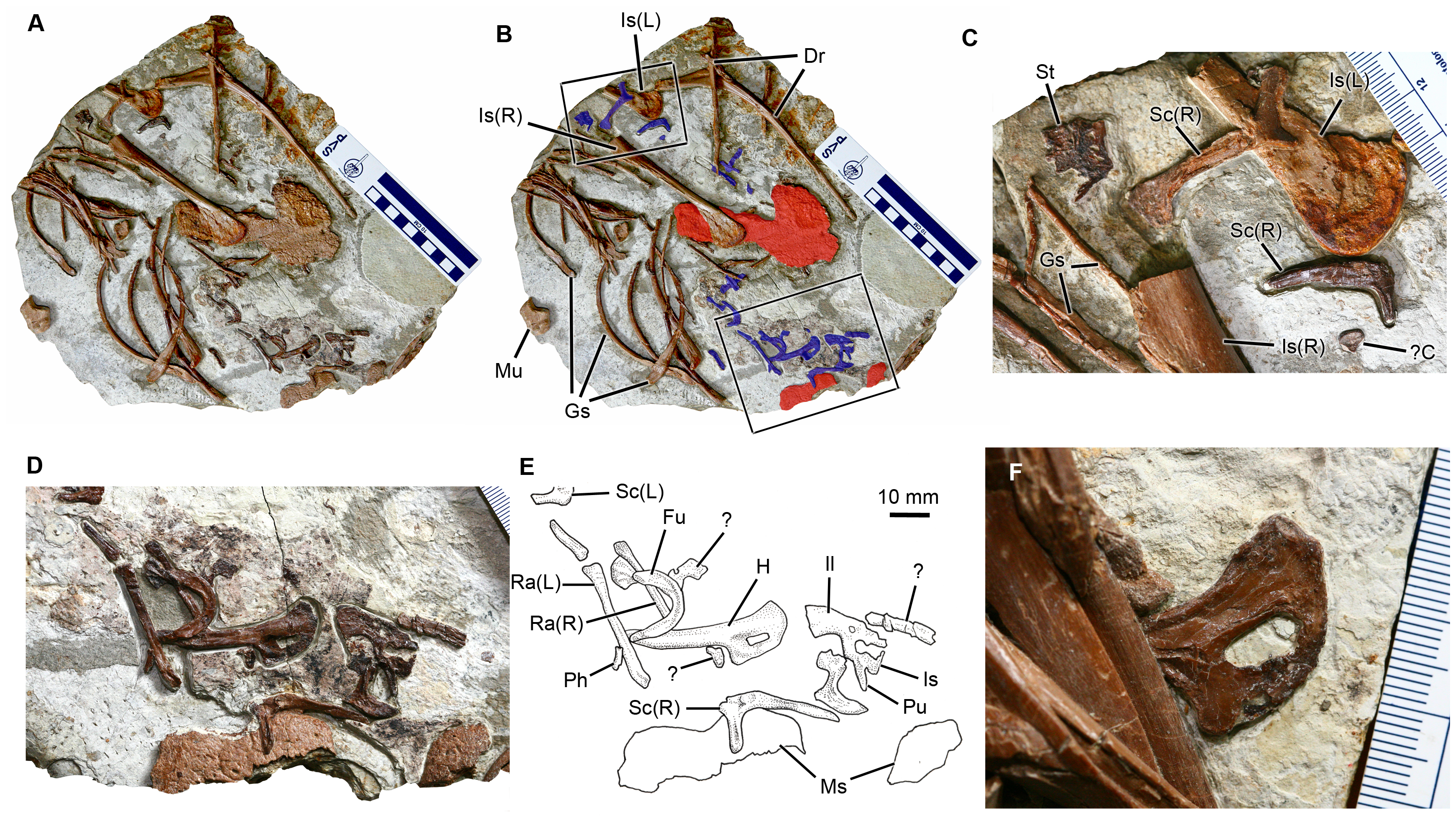
Stomach contents of CAGS-IG-T1

That the second specimen in a short period of time caught two birds, together with the bird feather remains in the holotype stomach, might be an indication that Sinocalliopteryx specialised in such prey. Even the Sinornithosaurus might conform to this pattern as the authors considered it a possibly volant form. In 2011 a specimen of Microraptor was reported with a bird in its stomach and seen as proof that the former were arboreal. The 2012 study denied the relevance of flying prey for this issue as Sinocalliopteryx was in all likelihood cursorial, or ground-dwelling, and yet apparently quite capable of catching birds, e.g. by using stealth attack, a method employed by many modern cursorial predators of fowl. Additionally, embedded tooth of Sinocalliopteryx in the incomplete thoracic rib shaft from the holotype of Dongbeititan was described in 2012.
