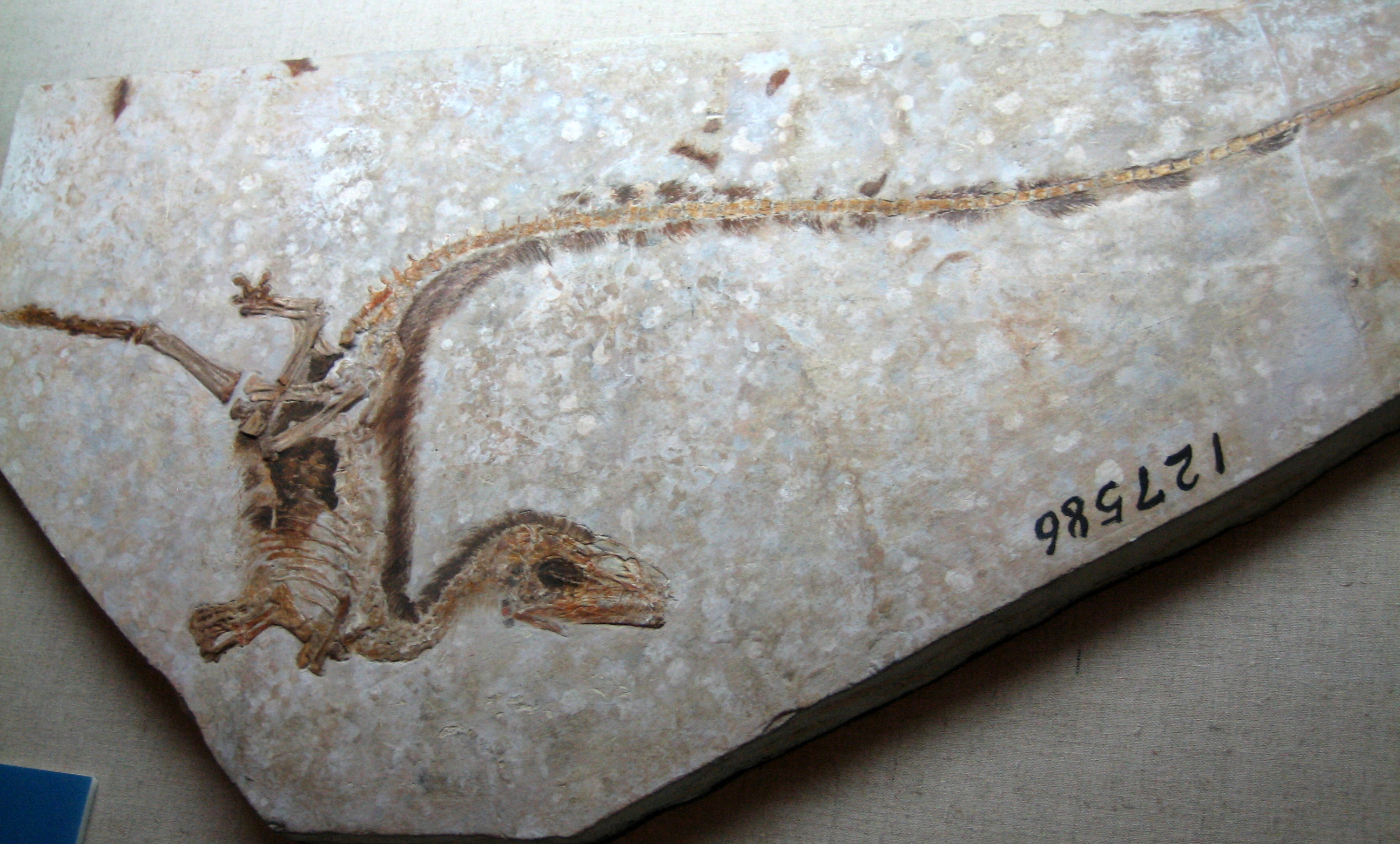
- S. prima holotype specimen with filament impressions, Inner Mongolia Museum

Scientific classification
- Kingdom: Animalia
- Phylum: Chordata
- Class: Reptilia
- Clade: Dinosauria
- Clade: Saurischia
- Clade: Theropoda
- Family: †Compsognathidae
- Genus: †Sinosauropteryx; Ji & Ji, 1996

Type species
- †Sinosauropteryx prima Ji & Ji, 1996

Other species
- †S. lingyuanensis Qiu et al., 2025

Synonyms
- Compsognathus prima (Ji & Ji, 1996) Morell, 1997

= Sinosauropteryx =

Sinosauropteryx Temporal range: Early Cretaceous(Barremian), 125.46–124.12 Ma

Extinct genus of dinosaurs

Sinosauropteryx (meaning "Chinese reptilian wing") is an extinct genus of coelurosaurian theropod dinosaurs. Described in 1996, it was the first dinosaur taxon outside of Avialae (birds and their immediate relatives) to be found with evidence of feathers. It was covered with a coat of very simple filament-like feathers. Structures that indicate the colour pattern have also been preserved in some of its feathers, which show that Sinosauropteryx had a countershading pattern in its body with a banded tail. The reddish brown colouration previously inferred for Sinosauropteryx is based on the melanosomes preserved in the specimen of a separate genus, Huadanosaurus. Some contention has arisen with an alternative interpretation of the filamentous impression as remains of collagen fibres, but this has not been widely accepted.

Sinosauropteryx was a small theropod with an unusually long tail and short arms. The longest known specimen reaches up to 1.07 metres (3.51 feet) in length, with an estimated weight of 0.55 kilograms (1.21 pounds). It was considered a close relative of the similar but older genus Compsognathus, with both genera belonging to the family Compsognathidae, though subsequent analyses did not recover this family to be monophyletic and placed Sinosauropteryx within its own family, Sinosauropterygidae. Two species of Sinosauropteryx have been named. The first, S. prima, is known from three specimens, named "first" in reference to its status as the first feathered non-avian dinosaur species discovered. The third specimen previously assigned to Sinosauropteryx most likely represents a tyrannosauroid unrelated to this genus. The second, S. lingyuanensis, is known from a single specimen, named after its type locality.

Sinosauropteryx lived in what is now northeastern China during the early Cretaceous period. It was among the first dinosaurs discovered from the Yixian Formation in Liaoning Province, and was a member of the Jehol Biota. Well-preserved fossils of this genus illustrate many aspects of its biology, such as its diet and reproduction.

== History of discovery ==
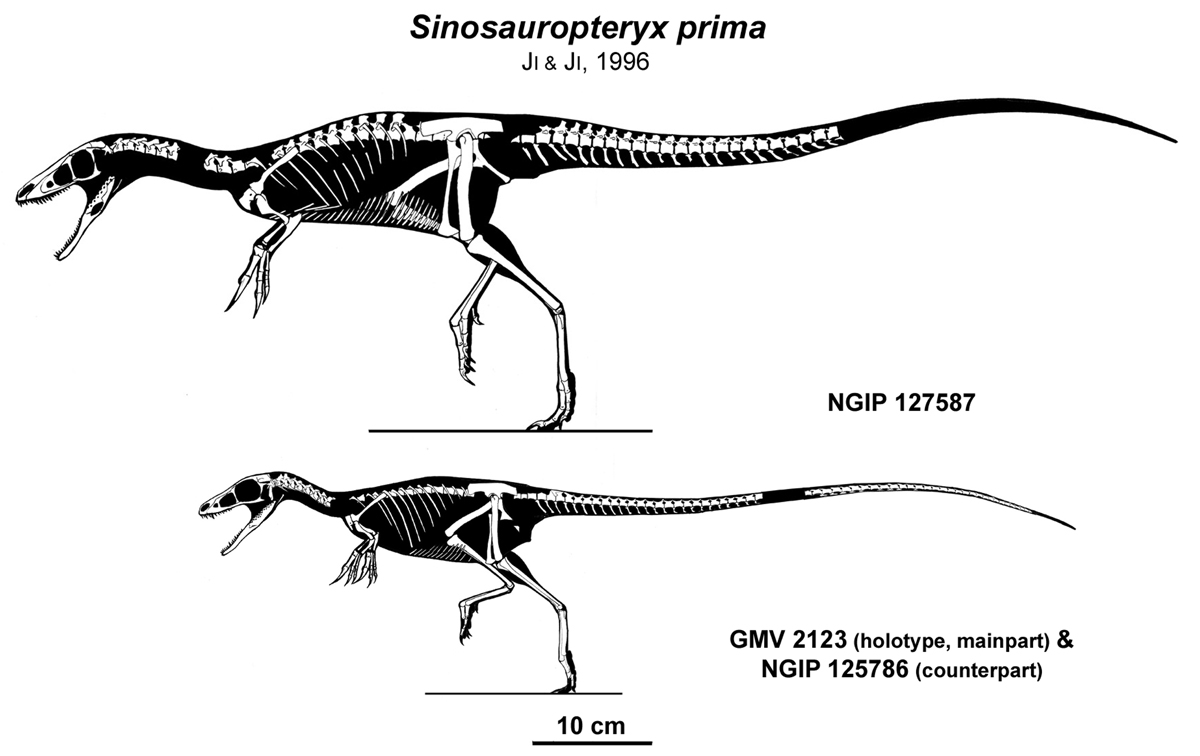
Skeletal diagram of S. prima showing known remains of the holotype and a referred specimen

The first fossil specimen of the dinosaur later named Sinosauropteryx prima was uncovered in August 1996 by Li Yumin. Yumin was a farmer and part-time fossil hunter who often prospected around Liaoning Province to acquire fossils to sell to individuals and museums. Yumin recognized the unique quality of the specimen, which was separated into two slabs, and sold the slabs to two separate museums in China: the National Geological Museum in Beijing, and the Nanjing Institute of Geology and Paleontology. The director of the Beijing museum, Ji Qiang, recognized the importance of the find, as did visiting Canadian palaeontologist Phil Currie and artist Michael Skrepnick, who became aware of the fossil by chance as they explored the Beijing museum's collections after leading a fossil tour of the area during the first week of October, 1996. Currie recognized the significance of the fossil immediately. As The New York Times quoted him, "When I saw this slab of siltstone mixed with volcanic ash in which the creature is embedded, I was bowled over." When originally described, the authors named Sinosauropteryx, meaning "Chinese Reptilian Wing".

Chinese authorities initially barred photographs of the specimen from publication. However, Currie brought a photograph to the 1996 meeting of the Society of Vertebrate Paleontology at the American Museum of Natural History in New York, causing crowds of palaeontologists to gather and discuss the new discovery. The news reportedly left palaeontologist John Ostrom, who in the 1970s had pioneered the theory that birds evolved from dinosaurs, "in a state of shock." Ostrom later joined an international team of researchers who gathered in Beijing to examine the fossils; other team members included feather expert Alan Brush, fossil bird expert Larry Martin, and Peter Wellnhofer, an expert on the early bird Archaeopteryx.

Three specimens have been assigned to Sinosauropteryx prima: the holotype GMV 2123 (and its counter slab [opposite face], NIGP 127586), NIGP 127587, and D 2141. Another specimen, IVPP V14202, was originally assigned to the genus in 2010, but was later designated as the holotype of a separate genus Huadanosaurus. The assignment of an additional larger specimen to S. prima, GMV 2124 (also known as NGMC 2124), was later found to be in error, and most likely belongs to Tyrannosauroidea. All of the fossils were found in the Jianshangou or Dawangzhangzi Beds of the Yixian Formation in the Beipiao and Lingyuan regions of Liaoning, China. These fossil beds have been dated to 124.6–122 million years ago, during the early Aptian stage of the Early Cretaceous.

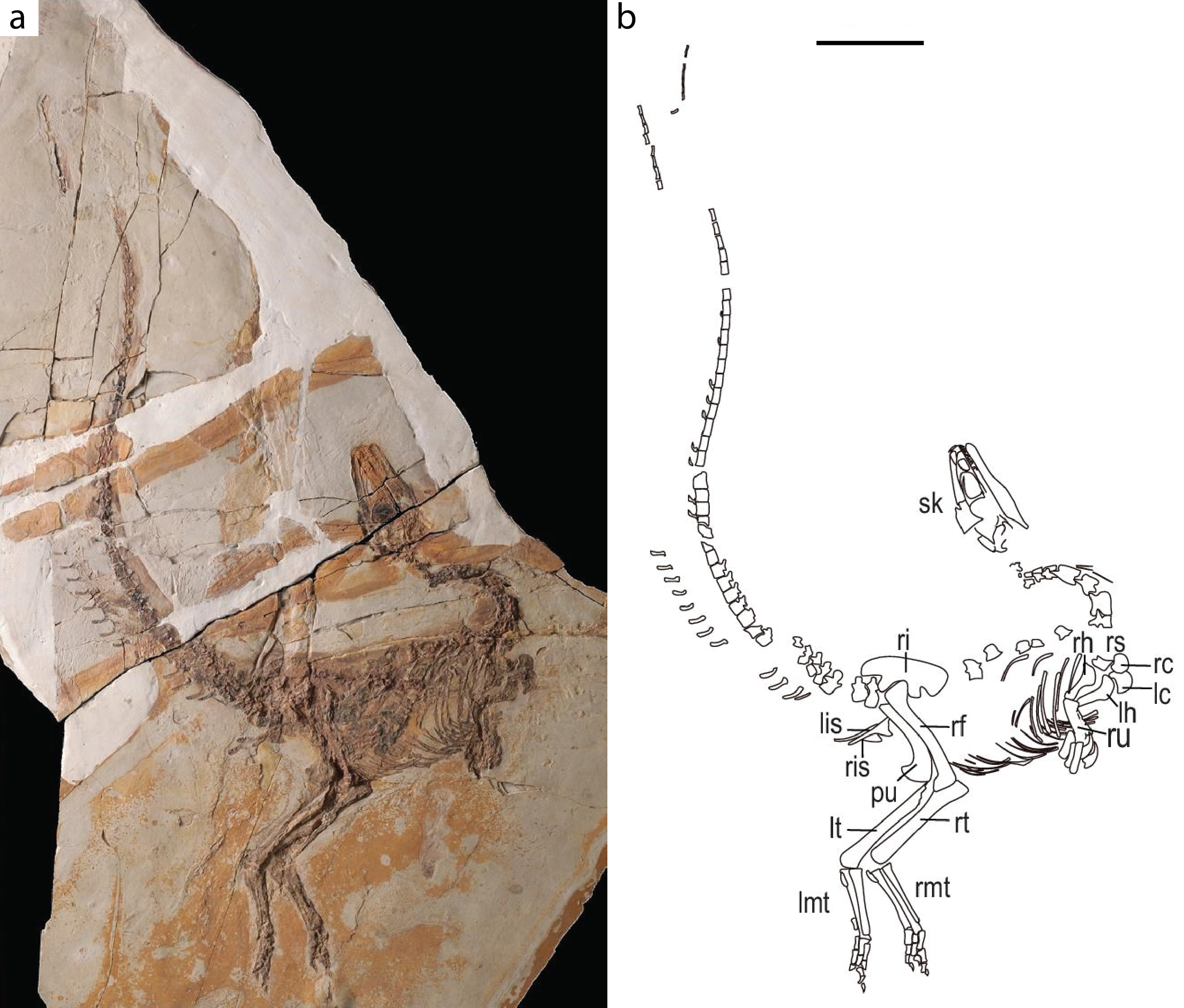
Holotype specimen and line diagram of S. lingyuanensis

In 2025, Rui Qiu and colleagues named and described a second species of Sinosauropteryx: S. lingyuanensis. The assigned holotype is IVPP V 12415, which comprises a near complete skeleton of a potential juvenile which also preserves traces of feather integument. The specimen was collected around 2010 from the Lower Cretaceous Yixian Formation of Dawangzhangzi (Lingyuan, Western Liaoning, China), and though it is of juvenile nature it represents the largest reported Sinosauropteryx individual. The species name, lingyuanensis, refers to Lingyuan which is the city where the holotype specimen was discovered.

=== Identity of filaments ===
Controversy regarding the identity of the filaments preserved in the first Sinosauropteryx specimen began almost immediately, as the team of scientists spent three days in Beijing examining the specimen under a microscope. The results of their studies (reported during a press conference at the Philadelphia Academy of Natural Sciences on Thursday, April 24, 1997) were inconclusive; the team agreed that the structures preserved on Sinosauropteryx were not modern feathers, but suggested further research was required to discover their exact nature. Palaeontologist Alan Feduccia, who had not yet examined the specimen, wrote in Audubon Magazine that the structures of Sinosauropteryx (which he considered at the time to be a synonym of Compsognathus, as Compsognathus prima) were stiffening structures from a frill running along the back, and that dinosaur palaeontologists were engaging in wishful thinking when equating the structures with feathers. Subsequent publications saw some of the team members disagreeing over the identity of the structures.

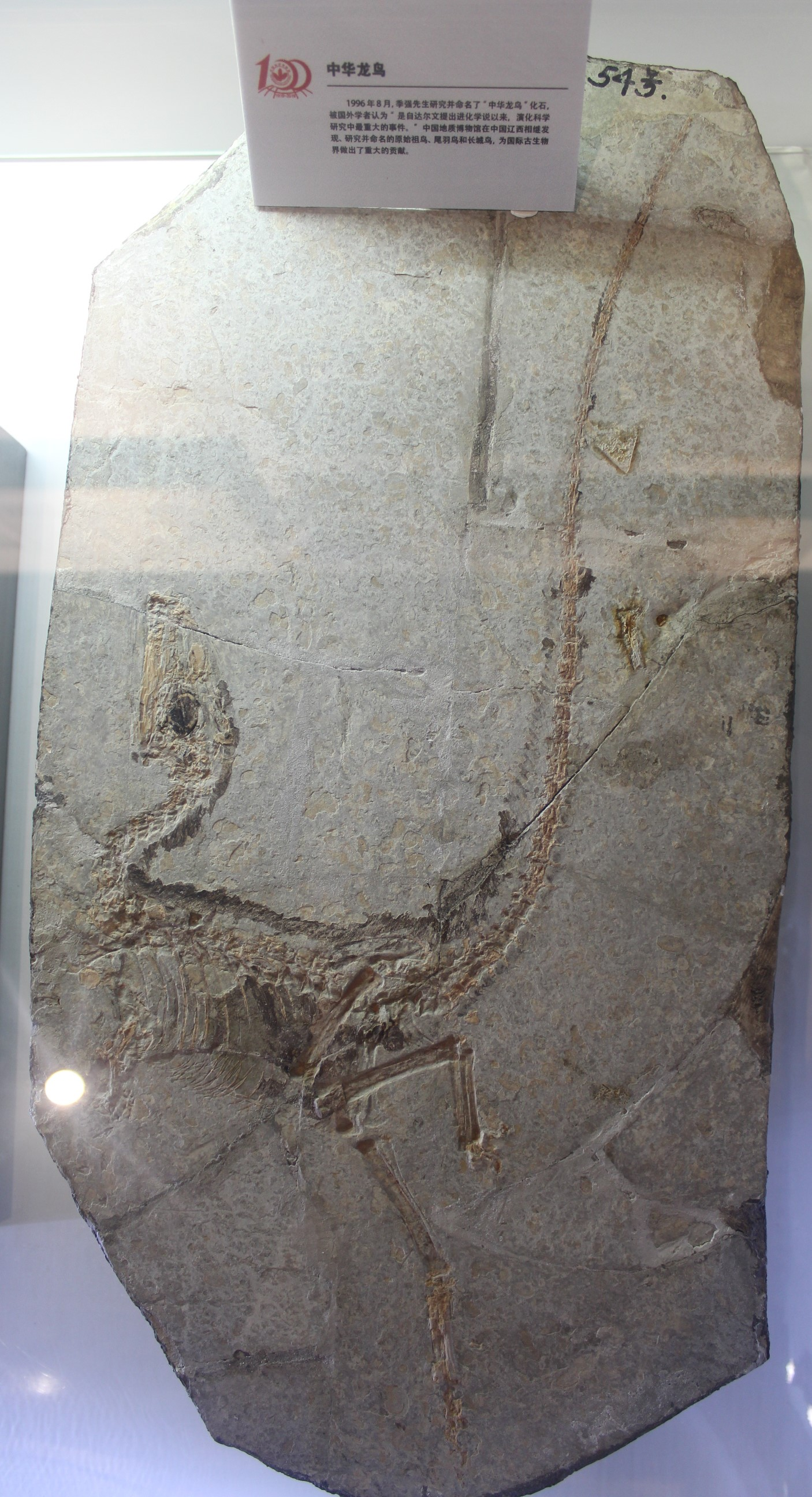
Counter slab of the S. prima holotype, on display at the Geological Museum of China

Feduccia's frill argument was followed up in several other publications, in which researchers interpreted the filamentous impressions around Sinosauropteryx fossils as remains of collagen fibres rather than primitive feathers. Since the structures are clearly external to the body, these researchers have proposed that the fibres formed a frill on the back of the animal and underside of its tail, similar to some modern aquatic lizards. The absence of feathers would refute the proposal that Sinosauropteryx is the most basal known theropod genus with feathers, and also raise questions about the current theory of feather origins itself. It calls into question the idea that the first feathers evolved not for flight but for insulation, and that they made their first appearance in relatively basal dinosaur lineages that later evolved into modern birds.

Most researchers have disagreed with the identification of the structures as collagen or other structural fibres. Notably, the team of scientists that reported the presence of pigmentation cells in the structures argued that their presence proved the structures were feathers, not collagen, because collagen does not contain pigment. Gregory S. Paul reidentified what the collagen hypothesis's proponents consider a body outline outside of the fibres as an artefact of preparation: breakage and brushed-on sealant have been misidentified as the outline of the body.

The hypothesis that the structures were collagen fibers was closely analyzed and disproven by a 2017 paper published by Smithwick et al. The integument of Sinosauropteryx was closely compared to less controversial evidence of collagen fibers preserved in the ichthyosaur Stenopterygius. Although the collagen hypothesis claimed that the central shafts (rachises) of purported theropod feathers were actually misidentified examples of shaft-like collagen fibers, higher quality imagery showed that these similarities were artificial. The supposed shafts in ichthyosaur collagen were actually scratch marks, cracks, and crevasses created during preparation of one of the ichthyosaur specimens. On the other hand, the shafts in the Sinosauropteryx specimens were legitimate examples of fossilized structures. The collagen hypothesis also claims that Sinosauropteryx integument includes beaded structures similar to structures occasionally found in decaying collagen of modern sea mammals. However, this claim was also unsupported, with Smithwick et al. finding no evidence of the beaded structures which collagen hypothesis proponents identified on the specimens. The study proposes that some areas of the fossil preserved in three dimensions cast shadows which would have resembled beaded structures in low quality photographs.

Other examples of purported collagen fibers in the tail area were revealed to be scratches, similar to those on the rest of the specimen. An area of the bone with an irregular surface was considered evidence that some collagen fibers were less decayed than others. However, Smithwick et al.'s study noted that, after further preparation, this irregular surface was simply a layer of sediment with a different color than the rest of the slab. The 'frill' or 'halo' of collagen identified by Feduccia was also determined to be misidentified sediment surrounding one of the specimens. Smithwick et al.'s study concluded by stating that the integument preserved on Sinosauropteryx closely resembled that of birds preserved in the same formation. Purported features of collagen fibers were in fact misidentified shadows formed by scratches or irregular sediment, a misidentification perpetuated by the low quality of early Sinosauropteryx photographs.

== Description ==
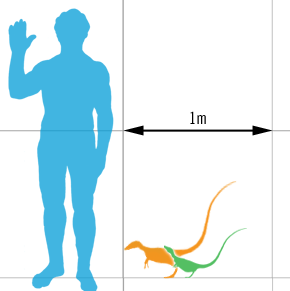
Size of adult and sub-adult S. prima specimens, compared with a human

Sinosauropteryx was a small bipedal theropod, noted for its short arms, large first finger (thumbs), and long tail. The taxon includes some of the smallest known adult non-avian theropod specimens, with the holotype specimen measuring only 68 cm (27 in) in length, including the tail. However, this individual was relatively immature. The longest known specimen reaches up to 1.07 m (3.5 ft) in length, with an estimated weight of 0.55 kg (1.2 lb). A subsequent paper estimated its mass to be 0.99 kg (2.2 lb).

Sinosauropteryx was anatomically similar to Compsognathus, differing from its European relatives in its proportions. The skull of Sinosauropteryx was 15% longer than its thigh bones, unlike in Compsognathus, where the skull and thigh bones are approximately equivalent in length. The arms of Sinosauropteryx (humerus and radius) were only 30% the length of its legs (thigh bone and shin), compared to 40% in Compsognathus. Additionally, Sinosauropteryx had several features unique among all other theropods. It had 64 vertebrae in its tail. This high number made its tail the longest relative to body length of any theropod. Its hands were long compared to its arms, about 84% to 91% of the length of the rest of the arm (humerus and radius), and half the length of the foot. The first and second digits were about the same length, with a large claw on the first digit. The first fingers were large, being both longer and thicker than either of the bones of the forearm. The teeth differed slightly (they were heterodont) based on position: those near the tips of the upper jaws (on the premaxillae) were slender and lacked serrations, while those behind them (on the maxillae) were serrated and laterally compressed. The teeth of the lower jaws were similarly differentiated.

A pigmented area in the abdomen of the holotype has been suggested as possible traces of organs, and was interpreted as the liver by John Ruben and colleagues, which they described as part of a crocodilian-like "hepatic piston" respiratory system. A later study, while agreeing that the pigmented area represented something originally inside the body, found no defined structure and noted that any organs would have been distorted by the processes that flattened the skeleton into an essentially two-dimensional form. Dark pigment is also present in the eye region of the holotype and another specimen.

=== Distinguishing anatomical features ===
Skeletal mount, Chaoyang Paleontological Museum

Ji and Ji (1996) identified many features that set Sinosauropteryx apart from other birds and non-avian dinosaurs. They found that it was a small primitive bird with a relatively high skull, blunt rostrum and a slightly high premaxilla; that the antorbital fenestra was elliptical but not enlarged, the dentary was robust, the surangular was narrow and elongated, and the dentition is extremely well developed and acute; that there are over 50 extremely elongated caudals, constituting 60% of the body length, and the forelimb is extremely short with a short and thick humerus; the pubis was elongated and extremely inflated at its distal end and the ischium is broad; the hind limb was long and robust, the tibia is only slightly longer than the femur, the tarsals are separated, and the metatarsals are relatively robust with unfused proximal ends; the feathers are short, small, and uniform; many ornament the top of the skull, cervical, and dorsal regions, in addition to the dorsal and ventral caudal region.

=== Feathers ===
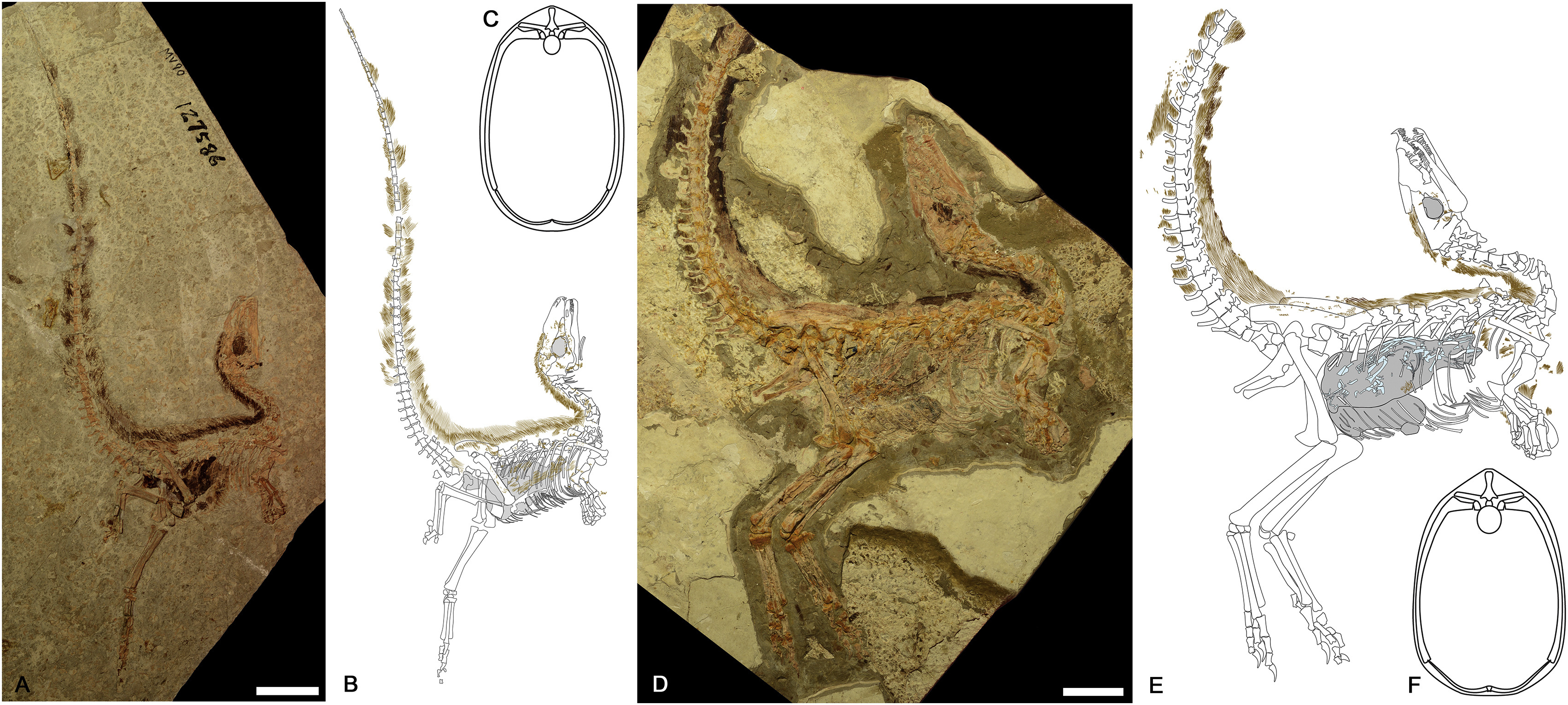
S. prima holotype and referred specimen with diagrams showing feathers and internal tissue

All described specimens of Sinosauropteryx preserve integumentary structures (filaments arising from the skin) which most palaeontologists interpret as a primitive type of feathers. These short, down-like filaments are preserved along the back half of the skull, the arms, neck, back, and top and bottom of the tail. Additional patches of feathers have been identified on the sides of the body, and palaeontologists Chen, Dong and Zheng proposed that the density of the feathers on the back and the randomness of the patches elsewhere on the body indicated the animals would have been fully feathered in life, with the ventral feathers having been removed by decomposition.

The filaments are preserved with a gap between the bones, which several authors have noted corresponds closely to the expected amount of skin and muscle tissue that would have been present in life. The feathers are closest to the bone on the skull and end of the tail, where little to no muscle was present, and the gap increases over the back vertebrae, where more musculature would be expected, indicating that the filaments were external to the skin and do not correspond with subcutaneous structures.

The filaments exhibit random orientations and are often wavy, which has been interpreted as evidence that they were soft and pliable in life. Microscopic examination shows that individual filaments appear dark along the edges and light internally, suggesting that they were hollow, like modern feathers. Compared to modern mammals the filaments were quite coarse, with each individual strand much larger and thicker than the corresponding hairs of similarly sized mammals.

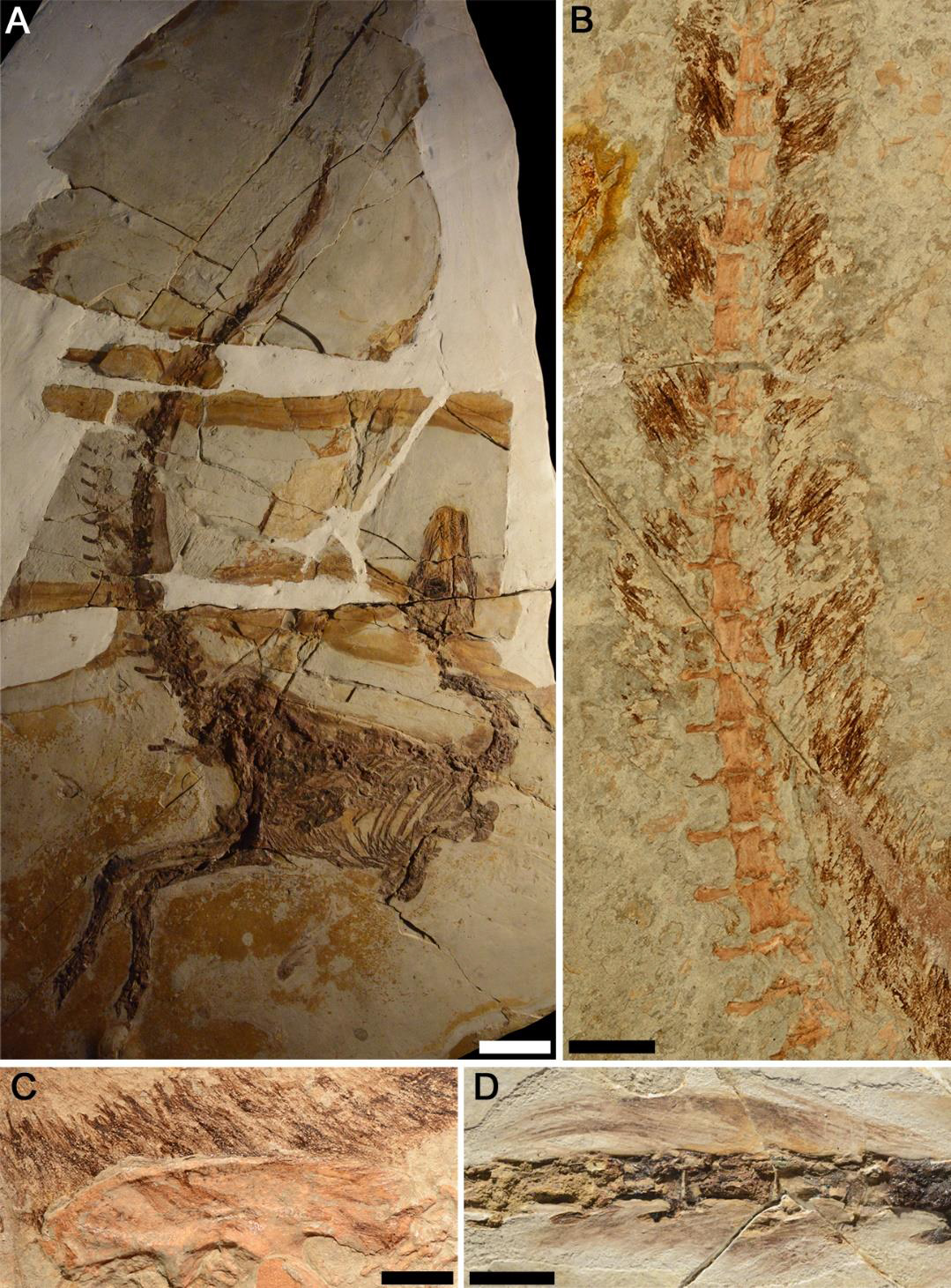
Preserved plumage in various specimens; A is the holotype of S. lingyuanensis (IVPP V12415)

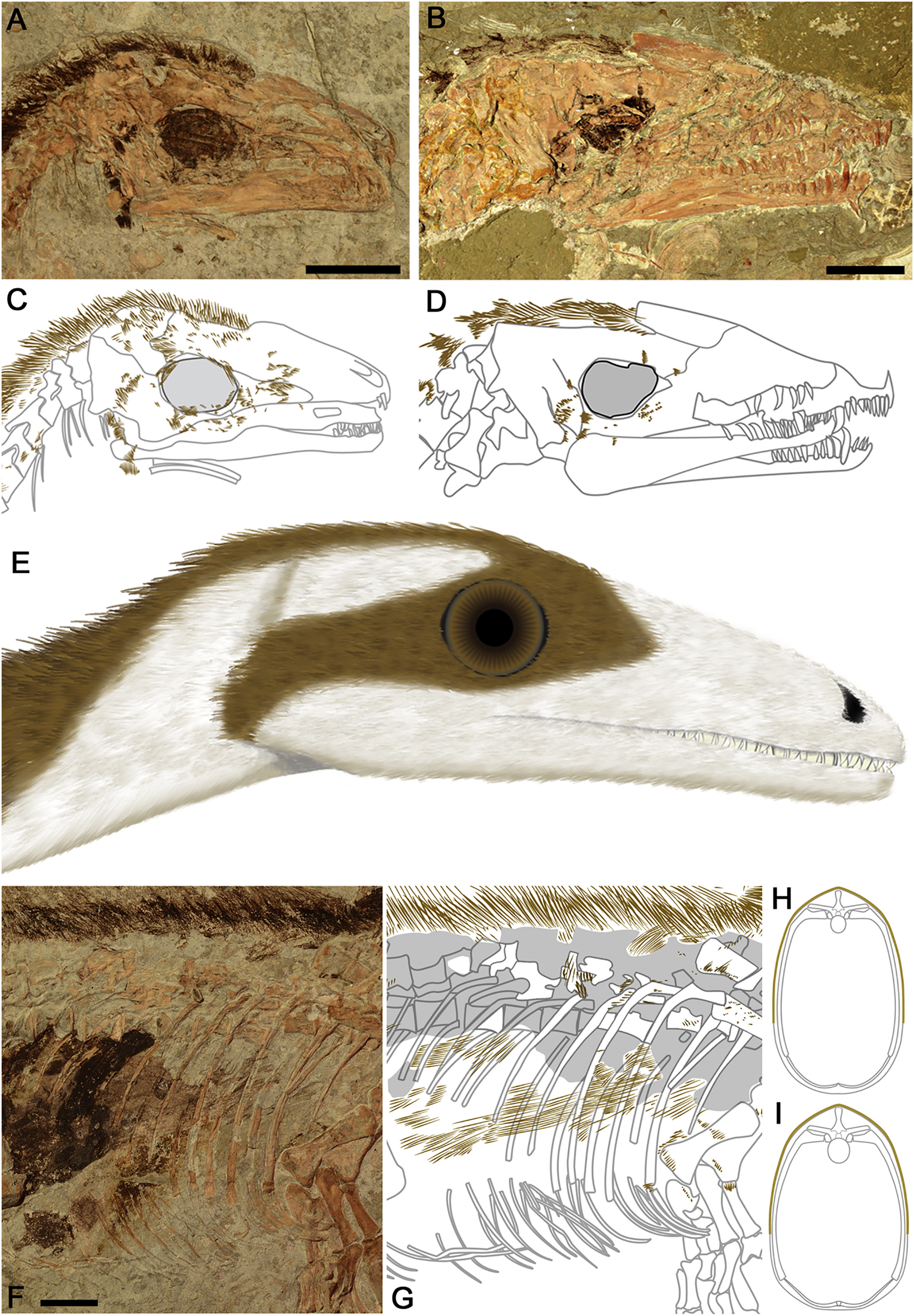
Preserved head (with reconstruction) and abdomen plumage of specimens NIGP 127586 and NIGP 127587, assigned to S. prima

The length of the filaments varies across the body. On the type specimen, they are shortest just in front of the eyes, with a length of 13 mm (0.51 in). Going further along the body, the filaments rapidly increase in length until reaching lengths of 35 mm (1.4 in) over the shoulder blades. The length remains uniform over the back, until beyond the hips, when the filaments lengthen again and reach their maximum length midway down the tail at 40 mm (1.6 in). The filaments on the underside of the tail are shorter overall and decrease in length more rapidly than those on the dorsal surface. By the 25th tail vertebrae, the filaments on the underside reach a length of only 35 mm (1.4 in). The longest feathers present on the forearm measured 14 mm (0.55 in).

Though the feathers are too dense to isolate a single structure for examination, several studies have suggested the presence of two distinct filament types (thick and thin) interspersed with each other. The thick filaments tend to appear 'stiffer' than thin filaments, and the thin filaments tend to lie parallel to each other but at angles to nearby thick filaments. These properties suggest that the individual feathers consisted of a central quill (rachis) with thinner barbs branching off from it, similar to but more primitive in structure than modern bird feathers. Overall, the filaments most closely resemble the "plumules" or down-like feathers of some modern birds, with a thick central quill and long, thin barbs. The same structures are seen in other fossils from the Yixian Formation, including Confuciusornis.

However, a 2018 study considered that the thick filaments could simply be bundles of thin filaments overlapping each other. This possibility is supported by the observation that thin filaments tend to run parallel to both each other and thick filaments, rather than branching out as earlier authors identified. Some of the thick filaments are quite long yet end in small tufts of thin filaments. Plumaceous, down-like feathering typically has an opposite appearance, with a short central quill and long tufts. In addition, the thick filaments preserve no evidence of Calcium phosphate, the mineral which modern feather quills are made of. The large amount of curvature present in the filaments also makes a strong central quill unlikely. Thus, the idea that thick filaments are simply bundles of thin filaments is less unusual than the idea that they were a variant of quilled plumaceous feathers which developed a morphology opposite that of birds and other feathered theropods. As a whole, the study preferred the hypothesis that Sinosauropteryx feathers were simple single-branch filaments, although it is conceivable that they were occasionally joined at the base into tufts as predecessors to down-like plumaceous feathers.

While Sinosauropteryx had feather-like structures, it was not very closely related to the previous "first bird" Archaeopteryx. There are many dinosaur clades that were more closely related to Archaeopteryx than Sinosauropteryx was, including the deinonychosaurians, the oviraptorosaurians, and the therizinosauroids. This indicates that feathers may have been a characteristic of many theropod dinosaurs, not just the obviously bird-like ones, making it quite likely that equally distant animals such as Compsognathus had feathers as well.

==== Colouration ====
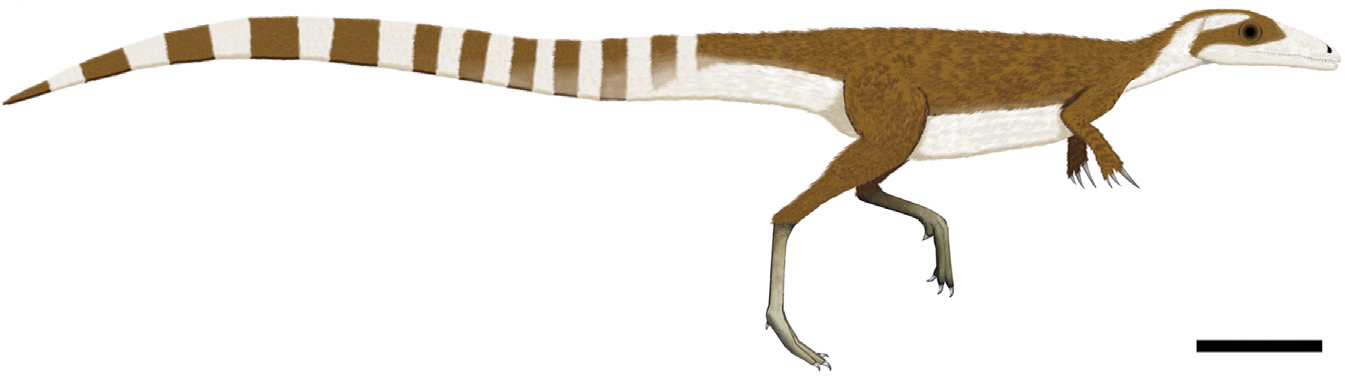
Restoration of Sinosauropteryx illustrating colouration as suggested by the study of preserved melanosomes of Huadanosaurus and the colour pattern inferred from specimens of Sinosauropteryx

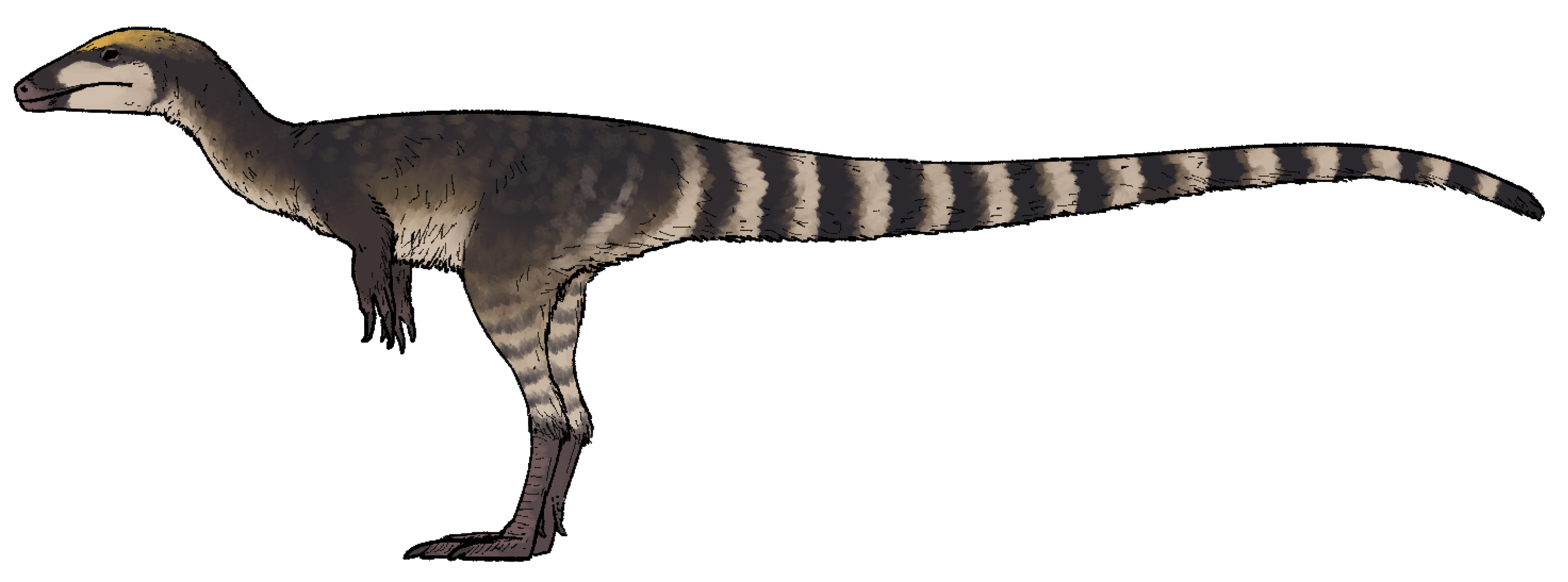
Life restoration of S. lingyuanensis

Sinosauropteryx was the first non-avian dinosaur to have its life colouration described by scientists based on physical evidence. Some fossils of Sinosauropteryx show an alternation of lighter and darker bands preserved on the tail. Chen and colleagues initially interpreted this banding pattern as an artifact of the splitting between the main slab and counter slab in which the original specimen was preserved. However, Longrich suggested in his 2002 presentation for the Society of Vertebrate Paleontology that these specimens actually preserve remnants of the colouration pattern the animal would have exhibited in life. He argued that the dark, banded areas on the tail were too evenly spaced to have been caused by random separation of the fossil slabs, and that they represent fossilized pigments present in the feathers. Additionally, rather than an artifact of preservation or decomposition, the presence of dark feathers along only the top of the body may also reflect the colour pattern in life, indicating that Sinosauropteryx prima was countershaded with dark colouration on its back and lighter colouration on its underside, with bands or stripes on the tail for camouflage.

Longrich's conclusions were supported in a paper first published online in the journal Nature in January 2010. Fucheng Zhang and colleagues examined the fossilized feathers of several dinosaurs and early birds, and found evidence that they preserved melanosomes, the cell components that give the feathers of modern birds their colour. Among the specimens studied was a previously undescribed specimen of Sinosauropteryx, IVPP V14202, though this specimen is now the holotype of a separate genus Huadanosaurus. By examining melanosome structure and distribution, Zhang and colleagues were able to confirm the presence of light and dark bands of colour in the tail feathers of this specimen (now the holotype of Huadanosaurus) like that of a red panda. Furthermore, the team was able to compare melanosome types to those of modern birds to determine a general range of colour. From the presence of phaeomelanosomes, spherical melanosomes that make and store red pigment, they concluded that the darker feathers of this specimen were chestnut or reddish brown in colour. More research on the coloration of Sinosauropteryx based on three specimens (NIGP 127586, NIGP 127587, and IVPP V12415) reveals that it had a raccoon-like bandit mask and countershading patterns most likely associated with an open habitat, indicating that the Jehol likely had a range of habitat types.

== Classification ==
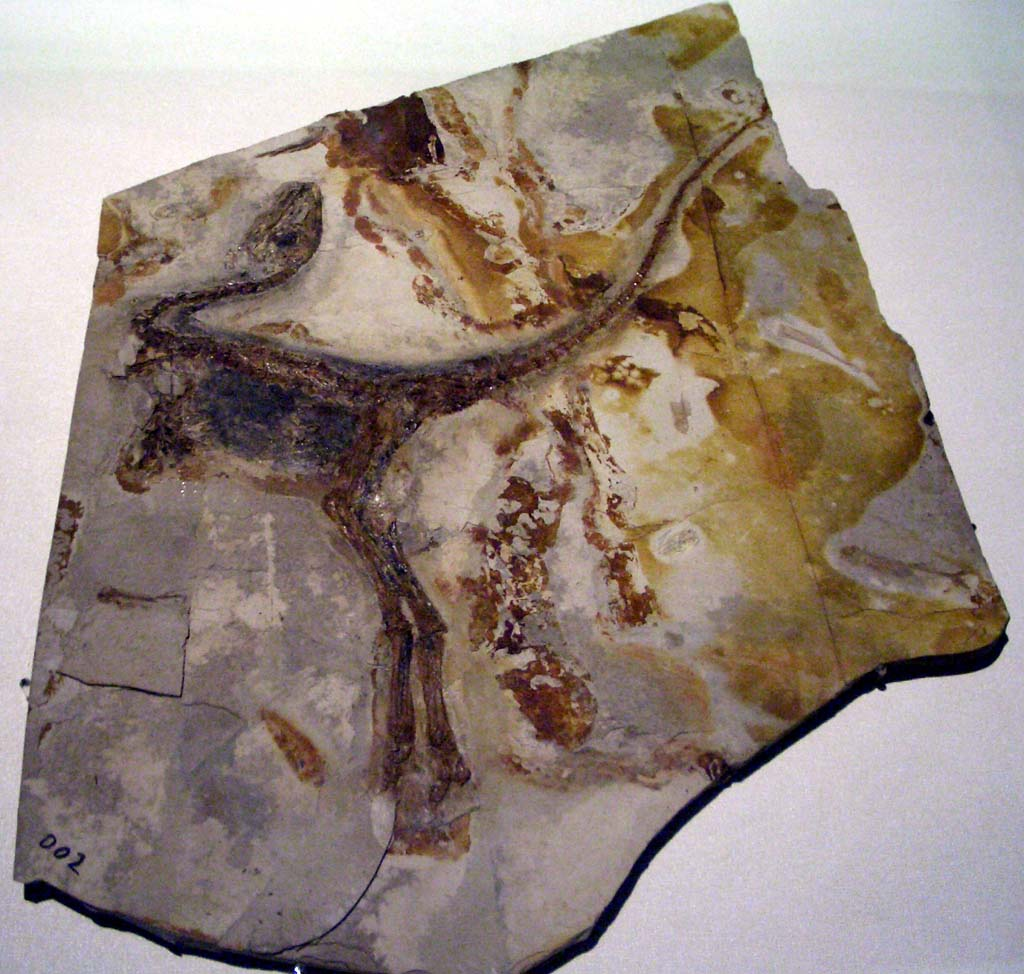
Undescribed fossil specimen at the Hong Kong Science Museum

Despite its feathers, palaeontologists do not consider Sinosauropteryx to be a bird. Phylogenetically, the genus is only distantly related to the clade Aves, usually defined as Archaeopteryx lithographica plus modern birds. The scientists who described Sinosauropteryx, however, used a character-based, or apomorphic, definition of the Class Aves, in which any animal with feathers is considered to be a bird. They argued that the filamentous plumes of Sinosauropteryx represent true feathers with a rachis and barbs, and thus that Sinosauropteryx should be considered a true bird. They classified the genus as belonging to a new biological order, Sinosauropterygiformes, family Sinosauropterygidae, within the subclass Sauriurae. These proposals have not been accepted, and Sinosauropteryx is generally classified in the family Compsognathidae, a group of small-bodied long-tailed coelurosaurian theropods known from the Late Jurassic and Early Cretaceous of Asia, Europe, and South America.

Below is a cladogram showing the placement of Sinosauropteryx within Coelurosauria by Senter et al. in 2012.

- Coelurosauria
  - Tyrannosauroidea
    - Coeluridae
      - Coelurus
      - Tanycolagreus
    - - - Dilong
        - Guanlong
      - - Raptorex
        - - Gorgosaurus
          - - Daspletosaurus
            - Tyrannosaurus
  - - Compsognathidae
      - - Sinocalliopteryx
        - Huaxiagnathus
      - - Sinosauropteryx
        - - Compsognathus
          - - Juravenator
            - Scipionyx
    - Maniraptoriformes

In 2024, Andrea Cau published a study on the phylogenetics of compsognathids that called the assessment of these taxa into question. The paper recovered Sinosauropteryx, along with three other proposed compsognathids in a polytomy within basal Coelurosauria. This polytomy notably did not include Composognathus proper, which would make none of these species compsognathids.

In their description of S. lingyuanensis, Qiu et al. (2025) also commented on the monophyly of Compsognathidae and revived the previously monotypic Sinosauropterygidae within Coelurosauria as a monophyletic family containing all compsognathid-like theropods from the Jehol Biota of China (Sinosauropteryx, Huadanosaurus, Huaxiagnathus and Sinocalliopteryx) in addition to Mirischia. Their phylogenetic analyses using two separate datasets are reproduced below:

Topology A: OSP dataset

- - Sinosauropterygidae
    - - Sinosauropteryx lingyuanensis
      - Sinosauropteryx prima
    - - Huaxiagnathus orientalis
      - - Huadanosaurus sinensis
        - - Mirischia asymmetrica
          - Sinocalliopteryx gigas
  - - Tyrannosauroidea
    - Other maniraptoriforms

Topology B: TWiG dataset

- - Tyrannosauroidea
  - - Sinosauropterygidae
      - - Mirischia asymmetrica
        - - Huaxiagnathus orientalis
          - Sinocalliopteryx gigas
      - - Juravenator starki
        - - Huadanosaurus sinensis
          - - Compsognathus longipes
            - - Sinosauropteryx lingyuanensis
              - Sinosauropteryx prima
    - - Other maniraptoriforms

Hendrickx commented that both S. lingyuanensis and Huadanosaurus can alternatively be suggested as juveniles of already known tyrannosauroids from the Jehol Biota, since the describers did not provide strong arguments against this possibility.

== Palaeobiology ==
=== Diet ===
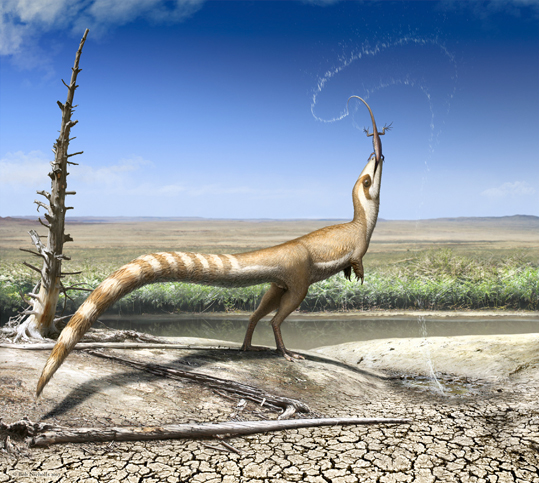
Restoration of S. prima preying on Dalinghosaurus, by Bob Nicholls

The specimen NIGP 127587 was preserved with the remains of a lizard in its gut region, indicating that small, fast-moving animals made up part of the diet of Sinosauropteryx prima. Numerous lizards of this type have been found in the same rocks as Sinosauropteryx. These lizards have been interpreted as most likely belonging to the genus Dalinghosaurus. Dalinghosaurus was probably a fast-running lizard adapted to living in open habitats, much like Sinosauropteryx itself.

The previously attributed Sinosauropteryx specimen GMV 2124 (Sinosauropteryx? sp.) was found with three mammal jaws in its gut region. Hurum, Luo, and Kielan-Jaworowska (2006) identified two of these jaws as belonging to Zhangheotherium and the third to Sinobaatar, showing that these two mammals were part of the animal's diet. Zhangheotherium is known to have had a spur on the ankle, like the modern platypus, which would indicate that Sinosauropteryx fed on possibly venomous mammals. However, this specimen was later reclassified as a tyrannosauroid.

=== Reproduction ===
The same specimen of S. prima which had preserved a lizard in its stomach contents (NIGP 127587) also had several small eggs in its abdomen. Two eggs were preserved just in front of and above the pubic boot, and several more may lie underneath them on the slab. It is unlikely that they were eaten by the animal, as they are in the wrong part of the body cavity for the egg shells to have remained intact. It is more likely that they are unlaid eggs produced by the animal itself, proving the specimen to be a female. Each egg measured 36 mm (1.4 in) long by 26 mm (1.0 in) wide. The presence of two developed eggs suggests that Sinosauropteryx had dual oviducts and laid eggs in pairs, like other theropods.

== Palaeoecology ==
Sinosauropteryx, as a Yixian Formation dinosaur, is a member of the Jehol Biota, the assemblage of organisms found in the Yixian Formation and overlying Jiufotang Formation. The Yixian Formation is composed largely of volcanic rocks such as andesite and basalt. Between the volcanic layers are several beds of sedimentary rocks representing deposition in a lake. The freshwater lake strata of the Yixian Formation have preserved a wide variety of plants, invertebrates, and vertebrates. Gymnosperm forests were extensive, with a few early flowering plants as well. Ostracods and insects were diverse, and bivalves and gastropods were abundant. Mammals and birds are also well known from the formation. The setting was subject to periodic mortality events including volcanic eruptions, wildfires, and noxious gases erupting from the lakes. The climate has been interpreted as temperate, with distinct wet and dry seasons. The yearly temperature during this time period averaged about 10 °C (50 °F), indicating a temperate climate with unusually cold winters for the generally warm Mesozoic era, possibly due to northern China's high latitude during this time.

== See also ==
- Dinosaur coloration
