= Biodiversity of New Caledonia =

Variety of life in the New Caledonia archipelago and its seas

Location of New Caledonia in its region

The biodiversity of New Caledonia is of exceptional biological and paleoecological interest. It is frequently referred to as a biodiversity hotspot. The territory is a large South Pacific archipelago with a total land area of more than 18,000 square kilometres (6,900 sq mi). The terrain includes a variety of reefs, atolls, small islands, and a variety of topographical and edaphic regions on the largest island, all of which promote the development of unusually concentrated biodiversity. The region's climate is oceanic and tropical.

New Caledonia is separated from the nearest mainland by more than 1,000 kilometres (620 mi) of open sea. Its isolation dates from at least the mid-Miocene, and possibly from the Oligocene, and that isolation has preserved its relict biota, fostering the evolution of wide ranges of endemic species.

== Location and description ==
New Caledonia lies on the southernmost edge of the tropical zone, near the Tropic of Capricorn. It is part of the Melanesia subregion. It includes the main island of Grande Terre, the Loyalty Islands, the Belep archipelago, the Isle of Pines, the Chesterfield Islands in the Coral Sea, and a few remote islets.

The archipelago is about 1,300 kilometres (810 mi) east of Australia and 1500 km, 1800 km and 1200 km from New Zealand, Papua New Guinea and Fiji respectively. A few lesser islands are closer, but now provide no convenient island-hopping path by which animal species could pass either to or from major mainlands. Some plants, invertebrates, sea mammals, and many flying species as aquatic birds, parrots, and bats have spread to new locations, either under their own power or due to freak events such as storms, or have been transported by humans. Some plant species have colonized new areas by means of seed carried by ocean currents.

Some animal and plant species have reached New Caledonia from surrounding regions and in turn, some New Caledonian species have successfully extended their ranges into the Pacific Ocean area. Other New Caledonian species or their close relatives are found in regions remote from the archipelago. For example, the New Caledonian parakeet is known to be the basal species in the genus Cyanoramphus, which has spread to many Pacific islands. Many bats and birds that rely heavily on fruit for their diet, including members of the families Cotingidae, Columbidae, Trogonidae, Turdidae, and Ramphastidae, swallow seeds, then regurgitate them or pass them in their faeces. Such seed dispersal (ornithochory) has been a major mechanism of seed dispersal across ocean barriers. Seeds of grasses, spores of algae, and the eggs of molluscs and other invertebrates may stick to the feet or feathers of birds, particularly migratory or aquatic birds, and in this way may travel long distances.

The main island, Grande Terre hosts multiple habitats under the influence of varied precipitation, geology, edaphic factors and altitude. New Caledonia has several biotopes, including dense evergreen forests, maquis shrubland, sclerophyllous (dry) forest, wetlands, savannas, and halophytic vegetation. The island has two main ecoregions: the greater area is occupied by the eastern New Caledonia rainforest while the now-fragmentary New Caledonia dry forest runs along the west coast.

The most conspicuous aspects of the New Caledonian marine environment are associated with the surrounding coral reef.

Such circumstances may be expected in general to promote biodiversity, but in the case of New Caledonia, a striking feature is the intense biodiversity in such a small land area. Presumably this is partly due to the edaphic and topographic features that define a number of discrete regions and ecological gradients. However, the local species do not always occupy all the potential niches, leaving the territory vulnerable to certain forms of invasion.

The larger flora include Nothofagus, Beilschmiedia, Adenodaphne, Winteraceae, Myrtaceae, southern sassafras (Atherospermataceae), conifers of Araucariaceae, Podocarpaceae, and Cupressaceae, and tree ferns.

=== Geologic origins ===
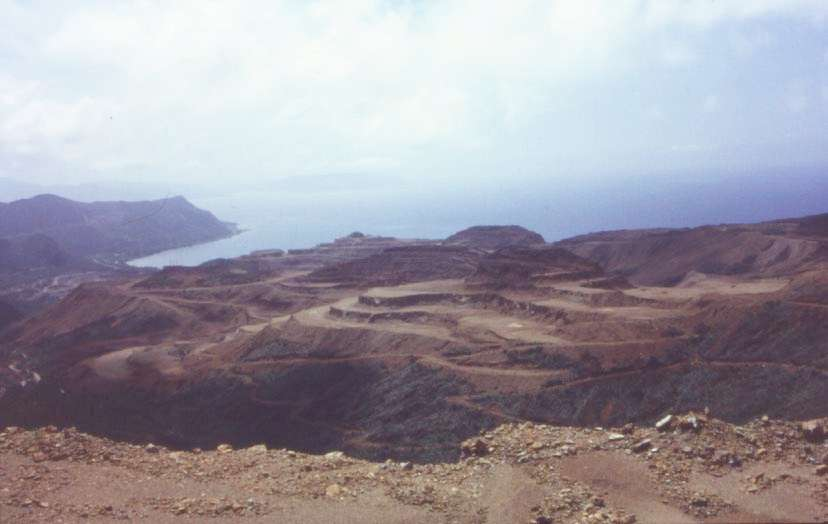
Mining vista

New Caledonia comprises fragments of the continental crust of Gondwana, dating to over one hundred million years ago (Ma), as well as volcanic material. The fragments apparently split from the Indo-Australian tectonic plate. Prevailing opinion holds that the archipelago represents the non-submerged regions of the continental fragment known as Zealandia. Zealandia broke away from the Australian part of Gondwana some 80-90 Ma. The separation of New Caledonia from mainland contact must have begun some tens of millions of years ago, probably during the Cretaceous period.

However, the view of the island as a surviving fragment of the Cretaceous period is obsolete. Islands from that time are partly or fully submerged. Most modern New Caledonian terranes formed via accretion of oceanic island arcs and seamounts. The biota evolved as metapopulations on islands that changed constantly until they merged into the archipelago. This hypothesis that the islands and their biota emerged about 37 Ma during the Oligocene better explains the organisms that occur in New Caledonian biota.

In the Carboniferous and Permian, New Zealand and New Caledonia were on the periphery of Gondwana, which included Africa, South America, Antarctica, India, New Zealand and Australia. Paleomagnetic data locate New Caledonia as originally near the South Pole. In the Triassic and early Jurassic, Gondwana moved northward, warming the eastern margin. New Caledonia separated from Australia and New Zealand during the breakup of the super-continent, separating from Australia at the end of the Cretaceous (66 Ma) and probably completing its separation from New Zealand in the mid-Miocene. However, as with any plate tectonic process, the process was protracted and in this region it was exceptionally complex. Many questions remain to be resolved.

The island soils derived largely from ultramafic rocks and have been a refuge for many native flora species that have adapted to their composition a long time ago; such flora can survive on acid soils with unfavourable compositions of nutrient elements. On New Caledonia examples of such soils commonly have an excess of magnesium, plus unusually high concentrations of phytotoxic compounds of heavy metals such as nickel. Not many invader species can compete successfully with plants adapted to such challenging soils.

The native flora evolved many extremophile species that thrive in environments sufficiently toxic to put invasive plants at a disadvantage. Many areas, mainly on Grand Terre have some very high concentrations of metalliferous rocks. Their mineral content is poorly suited to most foreign species of plants.

Ultramafic rocks also contain elevated amounts of chromium and nickel which may be toxic to plants. As a result, a distinctive type of vegetation develops on these soils. Examples are the ultramafic woodlands and barrens of the Appalachian mountains and piedmont, the "wet maquis" of the New Caledonia rain forests, and the ultramafic forests of Mount Kinabalu and other peaks in Sabah, Malaysia. Vegetation is typically stunted and is sometimes home to endemic species adapted to the soils.

Often thick, magnesite-calcrete caprock, laterite and duricrust forms over ultramafic rocks in tropical and subtropical environments. Particular floral assemblages associated with highly nickeliferous ultramafic rocks are indicative tools for mineral exploration. Weathered ultramafic rocks may form lateritic nickel ore deposits.

=== Early organisms ===
The marine fauna of the period, separate from that of the southwest Pacific, was distinguished as the "Maori province". Gondwana began its fragmentation in the middle and upper Jurassic, and the arrival of benthic invertebrate fauna is visible in fossil deposits. The Cretaceous marked the appearance of marine invertebrate fauna of southern origin. It was then that angiosperm flora such as Nothofagus and Proteaceae colonized New Zealand and New Caledonia, from South America, along the Antarctic margin of Gondwana.

At the beginning of the Tertiary, New Zealand and New Caledonia moved north to a warmer climate. This led to a long period of evolution in near complete isolation. New Caledonia's natural heritage includes species whose ancestors were present on New Caledonia when it broke away from Gondwana; not only species but entire genera and even families are unique to the island.

== Evolution and history ==
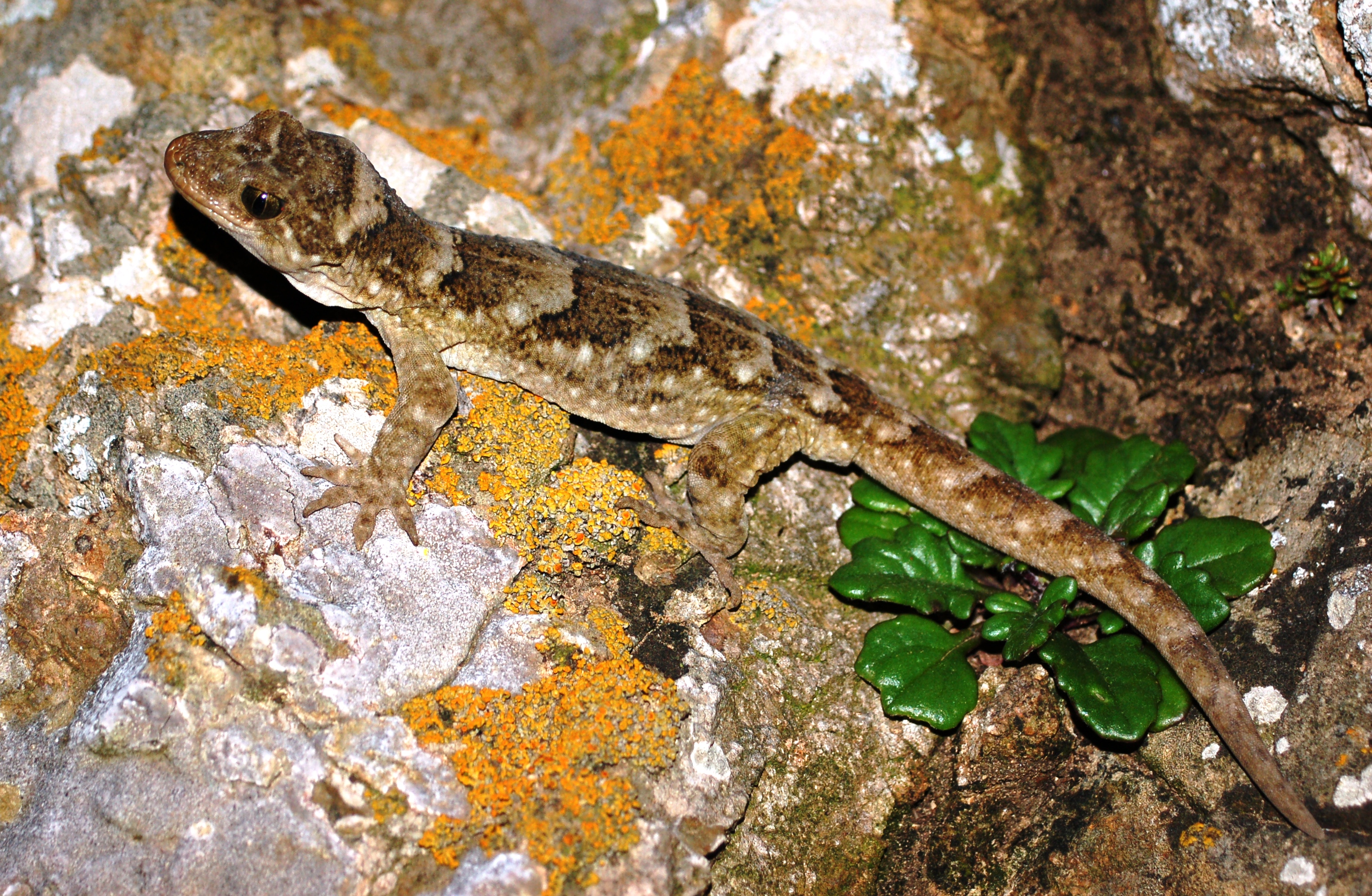
Many current species in the vicinity of the Pacific Island region similar to New Zealand's geckos, such as the Duvaucel's gecko, may have had their origins in New Caledonia.

The species of the archipelago of New Caledonia are relicts of a type of vegetation which earlier covered much of the tropics of the Earth, including much of the mainland of Australia, South America, Antarctica, South Africa, and North America. Although tropical cloud forests disappeared during the glaciations, they re-colonized large areas during successive geological eras when the weather was favorable again. At other times they were replaced by more cold-tolerant or drought-tolerant sclerophyll plant communities. Many of the then existing species became extinct because they could not cross the barriers posed by new oceans, mountains and deserts, but others found refuge as species relict in coastal areas and islands.

When the large landmasses became drier and with a harsher climate, this type of forest was reduced to those boundary areas. Although some remnants of archaic rich flora still persisted in coastal mountains and sheltered sites, their biodiversity was reduced. The location of the New Caledonian Islands in the Pacific Ocean moderated these climatic fluctuations, and maintained the relatively humid and mild climate which has allowed these communities to persist to the present day.

The ecological requirements of many of the species are those of the laurel forest, and like most of their counterparts laurifolia in the world, they are vigorous species with a great ability to populate the habitat that is conducive. The geographical isolation and special edaphic conditions helped to preserve it too. Some species are even specialized in nickel hyperaccumulation such as the Sapotaceae Sebertia acuminata.

Some geologists assert that, as the island moved north due to the effects of continental drift, it submerged at various intervals, extinguishing its terrestrial flora and fauna. Botanists counter that some areas must have remained above sea-level, serving as refugia. Many members of the late Cretaceous – early Tertiary Gondwanan flora survived in New Caledonia's equable climate but were eliminated in Australia due to increasingly dry conditions. The isolation of New Caledonia was not absolute, given the rise and fall of sea level caused by the ebb and flow of ice ages. Land bridges or islands formed between New Caledonia and its neighbours, the Solomon Islands, Vanuatu, and Australia. Thus new species came to New Caledonia while Gondwanan species were able to penetrate the Pacific Islands region. Plants have limited seed dispersal mobility away from the parent plant and consequently rely upon a variety of dispersal vectors to transport their propagules, including both abiotic and biotic vectors.

=== Extinct species ===
Numerous species were wiped out by humans before the arrival of Europeans. Fossils found in cave deposits show the island once had an endemic species of barn owl Tyto letocarti; two extinct hawks, Accipiter efficax, Accipiter quartus; a large, flightless galliform bird, Sylviornis neocaledoniae; a snipe, (Coenocorypha sp.); a gallinule, Porphyrio kukwiedei; the lowland kagu, Rhynochetos orarius; a ground dove, Gallicolumba longitarsus; the pile-builder megapode; a hornbill of Lifou (Loyalty Islands); a possibly extinct lorikeet, Charmosyna diadema; as well as a giant bat, arthropods and others. The island also hosted the giant terrestrial turtle Meiolania, unlike any alive today which was armed with a clubbed tail and a spiked head. There was also a species of terrestrial crocodile, the mekosuchine Mekosuchus inexpectatus which became extinct after the arrival of humans. Both Meiolania and Mekosuchus may have arrived after crossing the ocean, via island hopping and/or wave dispersal from Australia.

== Ecoregions ==
There are several vegetation types, in a variety of niches, landforms and micro-climates where endemic species thrive, among including dense evergreen forests, maquis (shrubland), sclerophyllous forests (dry forests), wetlands, savannas, and halophytic vegetation.

New Caledonia has two terrestrial ecoregions. The greater area is occupied by the eastern New Caledonia rain forests, which covers the eastern part of Grande Terre, Loyalty Islands, and Isle of Pines.

In the habitat of tropical montane laurel forest of New Caledonia with Laurisilvas, which are cloud-covered for much of the year, the moist evergreen forests have a closed canopy of moderately sized trees, up to 20 metres (66 ft) in the lowlands and 3 to 8 metres (9.8 to 26.2 ft) in montane forest. In humid montane Melaleuca forests of lowland, communities of Mt. Ignambi and of the Yaté Lake with area of low shrubland, is the ideal habitat for the native species. For example, Erythrinas are food plants for some native parakeet species.

The now-fragmentary New Caledonia dry forests runs along the west coast of Grand Terre. Europeans generally settled here, avoiding the eastern part of the Kanakas.

New Caledonia's marine environment is characterized by the surrounding New Caledonia Barrier Reef.

=== Dry forests ===
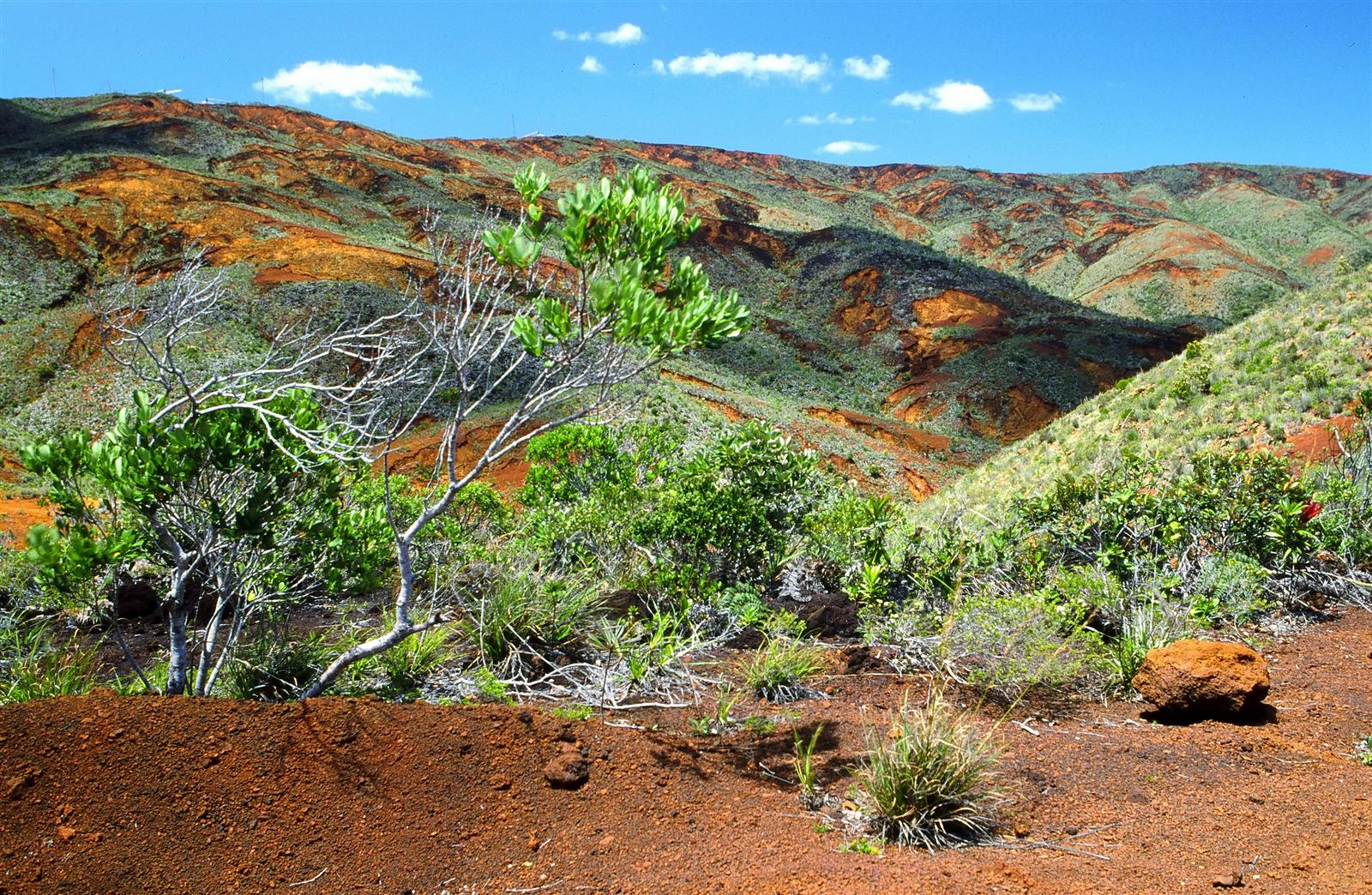
Typical terrain in the south of the islands at Grand Terre

The west coast of New Caledonia has a drier climate and different habitat from the rain forests that cover most of the island. The plant life of the west coast consists of nearly 400 species, including endemic species such as the unique Captaincookia margaretae, and Oryza neocaledonica, an endangered wild rice. This coast is home to endangered animals including the New Caledonia wattled bat (Chalinolobus neocaledonicus) and the ornate flying fox. Dry forests are vulnerable to fire and human intervention. The original vegetation was cleared for farming, especially cattle ranching, leaving only two percent of the original dry forest, in isolated patches, none of them protected. Urban areas on the west coast include New Caledonia's cosmopolitan capital Nouméa, while there are farms and farming communities all along the coast.

=== Rainforest ===
Mountain forests are mainly located on the lee slopes, where communities are evergreen species of laurel forest. The forests are typically evergreen because the mild climate allows for continuous biological activity. In the continuously-mild conditions, the number of species that share the canopy is high. This diversity earns them the name "rainforest", as opposed to "woods" ("Mediterranean wood", "temperate wood", etc.), implying canopies dominated by one or a few tree species. In this sense, the laurel forest is a transitional formation between temperate forests and rainforests. Many tree species do not have a coordinated timing of shedding their leaves, flowering or fruit ripening, with phases occurring at any time of year. The woody plants including conifers of the families Podocarpaceae, Araucariaceae and the subfamily Callitroideae of Cupressaceae and angiosperms such as families Erythroxylaceae, Epacridaceae, Proteaceae, Griseliniaceae, Cunoniaceae, Atherospermataceae, and Winteraceae, and genera such as southern beech (Nothofagus).

Many other families of flowering plants and ferns inhabit the forest, including some tree fern genera also known from Canadian fossils, including Dicksonia and Cyatheaceae (Sphaeropteris novae-caledoniae), or the tallest in the world, Sphaeropteris intermedia. Amborella has emerged as of great interest to plant systematists because molecular phylogenetic analyses consistently place it as the sister group to all other flowering plants.

There are many epiphytes and large, hanging mossy formations, giving a surreal and ghostly effect. Moisture is abundant, creating a moist, hygrophilous environment, in the form of mists, sprays, ponds and streams that permeate the entire visual field.

== Flora ==
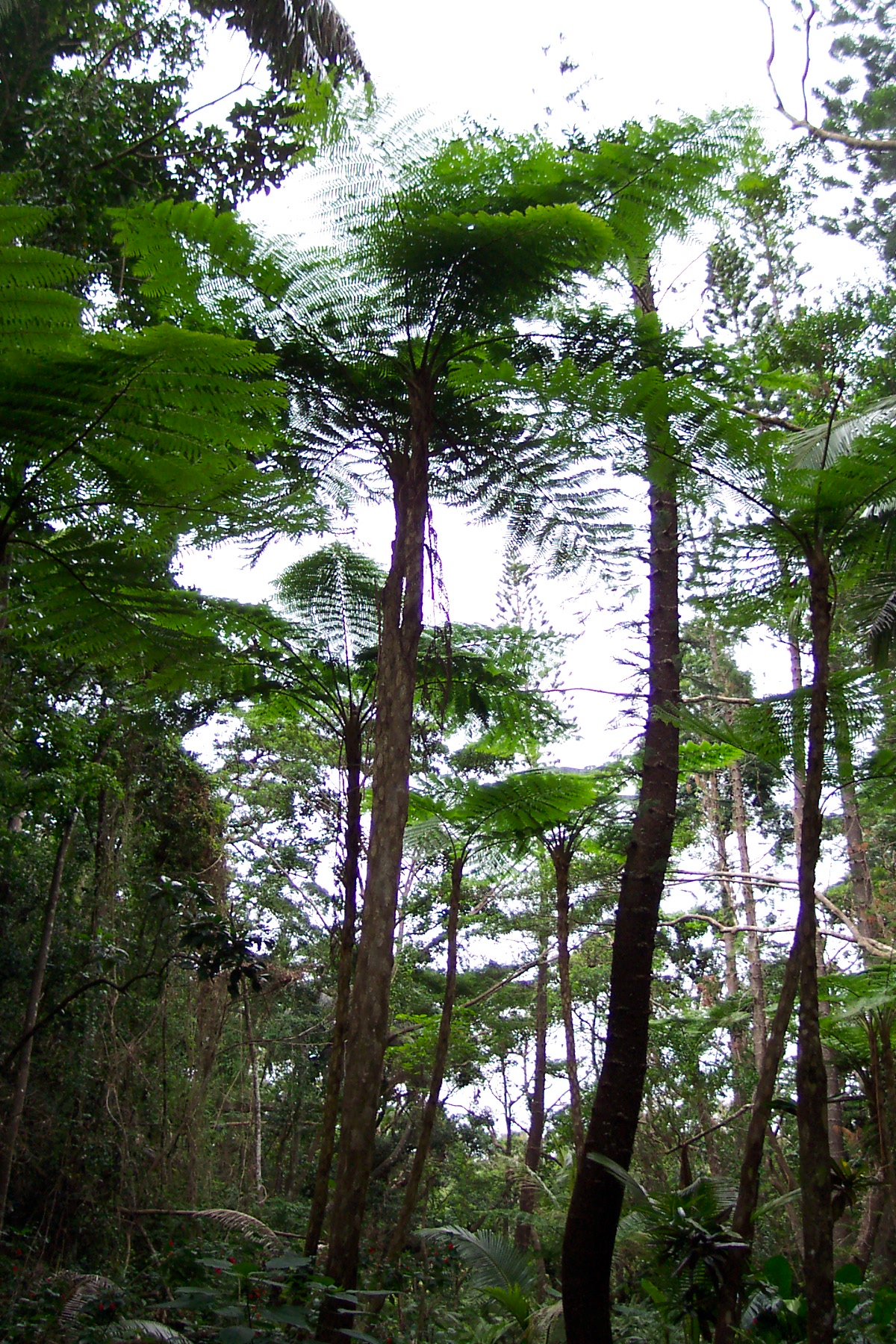
Tree ferns on Île des Pins

New Caledonia's vegetation is distinguished by the world's highest rate of endemism: 5 families, 107 genera and 3,380 species. Among these are Acacia spirorbis, Dracophyllum species, Drosera neocaledonica, Grevillea gillivrayi, Neocallitropsis pancheri (Cupressaceae), and Austrotaxus spicatus (Taxaceae). Of the 44 species of gymnosperm in the archipelago, 43 are endemic, including the unique parasite gymnosperm Parasitaxus ustus.

The palm trees (Arecaceae) include 37 endemic species belonging to 16 genera. All Arecaceae species in the genera Actinokentia, Basselinia, Burretiokentia, Chambeyronia, Clinosperma, Cyphokentia, Cyphophoenix, Kentiopsis, and Pritchardiopsis are endemic to New Caledonia. For the endangered Pritchardiopsis jennencyi, one only adult specimen is known.

Three of the most primitive genera of Araliaceae also occur.

Some New Caledonia plant communities are true living fossils. Flora contains many groups of plants that appear to be remnants of the Gondwanan flora in late Cretaceous - early Tertiary that once covered large parts of Australasia. The flora is exceedingly diverse and includes a level of endemism, per square kilometre, seen almost nowhere else on Earth. Three-quarters of native plant species on New Caledonia are endemic, but a quarter of those are "at risk" of decline or extinction.

There are besides 454 species of marine macrophytes.

In contrast, several groups that are well represented in the rest of tropics have only a few species on the Archipelago, such as Melastomataceae with one species, or are absent all together, e.g., Ochnaceae (sensu stricto) and Begoniaceae. Other families, such as Araceae, Boraginaceae, Brassicaceae, Commelinaceae, Gesneriaceae, and Zingiberaceae, are substantially under-represented.

Five families are considered endemic: the Amborellaceae, the Oncothecaceae, the Phellinaceae that was often included in Aquifoliaceae, the Paracryphiaceae, and the Strasburgeriaceae, before placed in Ochnaceae.

Some genera originated in the Gondwanian Antarctic flora. The most remarkable Gondwanian groups include the Cunoniaceae, the Myrtaceae, the Escalloniaceae and the Proteaceae. Due to this fact, the islands share many plant families with the Valdivian forest of South America, New Zealand, Tasmania and Australia, in habitats of cloud forest and temperate rainforest. Angiosperm flora colonized New Zealand and New Caledonia during the Cretaceous with genera such as Nothofagus, Forgesia, and Polyosma.

Many other groups reached New Caledonia after it separated from Australia, which took place as part of a widespread movement of Indo-Malesian elements that expanded into Australasia during the early and middle Tertiary. Some of these newer flora speciated intensively and are now among the largest genera on the island. Examples include Phyllanthus, with 111 species, Psychotria with about 85 species, and Eugenia with around 37 species, Flindersia in the family Rutaceae, and Polyosma among others.

Most gymnosperm species are in rainforest. The gymnosperms are more common in the poorer acid soils and in soils with an excess of magnesium and other phytotoxic elements derived from ultramafic rocks. 39 species are extant, while 27 are considered extinct. The gymnosperms are more common on exposed ridges or next to rivers or creeks in floodplains. Their concentration is important at individual locations which provide lifesaving refugia, because environmental conditions make interspecific competition less severe.

Four genera, Araucaria, Libocedrus, Prumnopitys and Retrophyllum that populate the subantarctic Pacific, have endemic species in New Caledonia. The genus Acmopyle (Podocarpaceae), currently present in New Caledonia and Fiji, is a fossil in Patagonia. There are 13 endemic species of Araucaria, including A. rulei and A. columnaris. The island shares some Araucaria species with Australia's Norfolk Island. Many, if not all current populations are relict.

Angiosperms also include many groups of archaic characteristics that appear as vestiges of an old Gondwanan floral background.

The bamboo genus Greslania is endemic to New Caledonia and comprises three or four species. They are found only in the southern part of the island where the soil contains heavy metals such as iron.

Several genera, belonging to primitive families, are endemic or sub-endemic. Amborella is the monospecific endemic genus of the endemic family Amborellaceae. Others are Hedycarya and Kibaropsis (Monimiaceae), Nemuaron (Atherospermataceae) and Balanops (Balanopaceae). The Winteraceae, of the order Magnoliales, considered the oldest group of angiosperms, are represented by the genus Zygogynum with 18 species of an order with fifty genera ranging over the Moluccas islands to northern Australia. Among the families with conducting vessels absent or imperfect, New Caledonia has Atherospermataceae, Amborellaceae, Annonaceae and Winteraceae, representatives of families of Chloranthaceae, such as the genus Ascarina with two species, Piperaceae, with twenty species of genera Piper and Peperomia, and Trimeniaceae with Trimenia neocaledonica.

The importance of the families of Gondwanan origin, both in the number of species and their abundance in different plant communities contrasts with the low representation in indigenous communities of more modern groups such as the Compositae, Gramineae, Labiatae and Melastomataceae.

The groups of Gondwanan origin are the most remarkable flora and include Cunoniaceae, Proteaceae and Myrtaceae. The family of Cunoniaceae has six genera in New Caledonia. Pancheria and Codia are endemic, although the last is known as a fossil in Australia, while Cunonia has 23 endemic species in New Caledonia and one species in South Africa. The other three genera have a Papuan-Australian (Acsmithia), Australian (Geissois) and Madagascan-Malesian-Papuan (Pterophylla) distribution.

Proteaceae's two main centers of dispersion are in Australia and Southern Africa; the family is represented in the archipelago by 43 species. They divide into six endemic genera: Beauprea, Beaupreopsis, Garnieria, Kermadecia, Sleumerodendron and Virotia and three non-endemic genera Grevillea, Knightia and Stenocarpus.

Myrtaceae, although basically Gondwanan in origin, currently range throughout the tropical world and have reached the Northern Hemisphere. With 229 species, it is the largest family in New Caledonia. It has two widely distributed genera, Eugenia and Syzygium. The endemic genera are Arillastrum, Cloezia, Myrtastrum, Pleurocalyptus, and Purpureostemon. The genus Melaleuca is represented by six endemic species and one shared with Australia and Papua New Guinea, Melaleuca quinquenervia, known locally as niaouli.

== Fauna ==
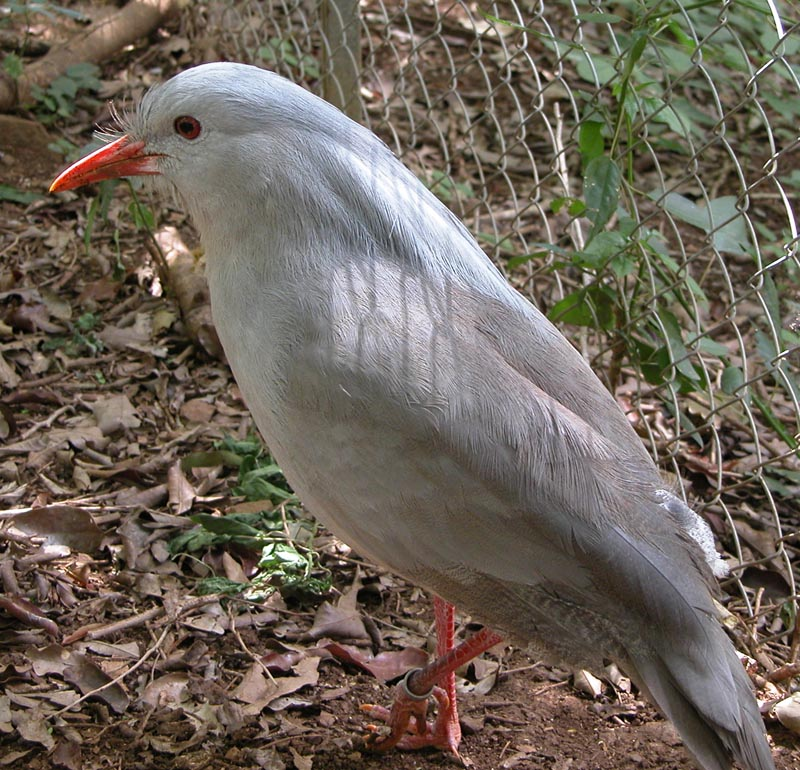
The kagu represents not only an endemic species but also New Caledonia's only endemic bird family, the Rhynochetidae.

The New Caledonia Great Barrier Reef is a UNESCO World Heritage Site and the second largest barrier reef in the world. Amedee island is a special marine reserve of coral reef lagoon, Ilot aux Goelands is a tiny lagoon island surrounded by a large shallow reef flat. The reef has great species diversity with a high level of endemism. Many groups have been under sampled and insufficiently studied, especially when considering hard bottoms of the intermediate coral reefs and external slopes of the barrier reef. This diversity includes oceanic and continental reefs forming islands, atolls, uplifted reefs, immerged reefs, fringing reefs, barrier reefs, patch reefs and shallow or deep lagoons, is home to endangered dugongs (Dugong dugon) and is an important nesting site for green sea turtle (Chelonia mydas). New Caledonia has a remarkable marine fauna due to the abundance of relic organisms from the Mesozoic, for example some sponges of the Lithistideae and the Tetractinellideae which are considered living fossils due to their closeness to Cretaceous species. The endemic mollusc Nautilus macromphalus is one of only four Nautilus species known in the world, the only living group of cephalopods with an external shell. This mollusc seems to be identical to its Paleozoic ancestor. Cephalodiscus graptolitoides, described in 1993, is also considered a living fossil member of the graptolites, previously thought to be extinct for over 300 million years.

Today's New Caledonian marine biodiversity has been counted to 9372 species, belonging to 3582 genera and 1107 families. Important groups that contribute include the molluscs (2151 species), fish (1695 species), the Foraminifera (585 species), the Brachyura (552 species) and the marine macrophytes (454 species).

New Caledonia's animal land diversity was similar to that of some oceanic islands, particularly New Zealand and as in these islands, the biodiversity was greater before being inhabited by humans. The island has no native mammals except for bats and no native amphibians. The vertebrates are dominated by reptiles and birds. Today the island has 21 endemic species of birds, including one endemic family, the Rhynochetidae, represented by one living species, the kagu. The island is also home to the unusual tool-using New Caledonian crow. The separation of the Gondwana islands before the mammalian expansion that allowed the radiation of flightless birds (moa, kiwi, sylviornis, cagous) and Mesozoic reptilian forms such as the tuatara of New Zealand.

Endemic species comprise 62 of 69 total. No crocodiles or terrestrial turtles remain on the islands. Two species of snake are found in the Territory, one on Grand Terre and the other on the Loyalty Islands. It is the home to a large number of skinks and geckos.

The island Île des Pins is home to the crested gecko Correlophus ciliatus and the world's largest gecko Rhacodactylus leachianus.

The island of Grande Terre has the greatest variety of reptiles, including the giant gecko (Rhacodactylus leachianus) and the giant skink (Phoboscincus bocourti). The local sea snakes laticaudinae have venom ten times as potent as rattlesnake venom.

Before the arrival of Europeans, the only mammals in the island were six endemic bat species, including Rousettus, a large fruit bat that was eaten by locals.

The world's highest biodiversity of Volutomitridae is in waters off New Caledonia.

Tropical invertebrates make up the bulk of the endemic fauna. They include freshwater sponges, annelid worms, molluscs terrestrial and freshwater, arachnids, scorpions and mygalomorphs of this many vicariant to the mygales of Queensland. There are fourteen endemic species of decapod crustaceans in rivers and lakes.

Mites, Pauropoda, Isopoda and Collembola inhabit the island. The most studied insect orders are Diptera, Hymenoptera, Lepidoptera, Psocoptera, Odonata, Ephemeroptera, Trichoptera and Dermaptera. About 4,000 insect species are recorded, showing high endemism at the species and genus levels. Notable are the giant coconut grasshopper (Pseudophyllanax imperialis) and other endemic insects including an ant (Cerapachys cohici), a cicada Kanakia typica, a damselfly Caledopteryx maculata a longhorned beetle Buprestomorpha montrouzieri, a phasmid Gigantophasma bicolor and a leafcutting bee Eutricharaea australis. There are 521 species of Lepidoptera, with 197 endemic (38%), notably the butterfly Montrouzier's swallowtail (Papilio montrouzieri), Graphium gelon, Polyura gamma, Paratisiphone lyrnessa, Austroypthima petersi and a sphinx moth Compsulyx cochereaui.

=== Birds ===
There are twenty-two endemic species of terrestrial birds, three endemic genera and one family. The New Caledonian crow (Corvus moneduloides) is known for its intelligence. The laurel forest pigeon (Columba vitiensis hyponochroa), giant wood pigeon notou (Ducula goliath). Two genera are endemic: Drepanoptila (the green pigeon), and Eunymphicus, Ouvea parakeet. The New Caledonian parakeet known to be the basal species in the genus Cyanoramphus, which had its origins in New Caledonia from where it spread to many ocean Pacific islands.

The best-known animal species is the Rhynochetos jubatus or cagou, which is at risk from dogs, rats and other predators. It is a chicken-sized bird, almost unable to fly, with a long crest and a funny cackling song, found in leafy forest mountains.

The other terrestrial endemic birds are Accipiter haplochrous, Philemon diemenensis, Erythrura psittacea, Zosterops xanthochroa, Phylidonyris undulata, Pachycephala caledonica, Aplonis striata, Gymnomyza aubryana, Eopsaltria flaviventris, Coracina analis, Myzomela caledonica, island thrushes (Turdus poliocephalus) T. p. xanthopus, T. p. pritzbueri (probably extinct) and Megalurulus mariei.

== Threats ==
New Caledonia's biodiversity is threatened by many factors. The ecosystems of isolated islands are typically vulnerable to takeover by introduced species, because they faced reduced competitive pressure as they originally evolved. Insects such as Wasmannia auropunctata and mammals such as rat, cat, dog and pig have taken a toll on native species, such as the ground-living kagu.

Deforestation from logging, mining, uncontrolled fires, agriculture, urban development and tourism all increase pressure on these fragile ecosystems by destroying vital habitat. Hunting is a problem in remote areas. Some species are at risk from overexploitation as medicinal plants.

Deforestation alone could cause the extinction of complete genera and orders across the restricted region with an accompanying loss of genetic and phylogenic information. For example, the reproductive structures of primigenia group of Amborella are true flowers that have a unique and provide an anatomical bridge between the structures seen for cone-bearing and flower-bearing plants. Its order is found only in New Caledonia.

The mining industry is focused on the island's rich nickel deposits, which comprise about one fourth of world reserves. In consequence, mining poses serious threats to its ecology.

The dry zone is the area most degraded by human activity, largely occupied by Colonial buildings fronting fine beaches and the infrastructure of the nickel industry.

Despite these threats, no species are known to have become extinct since 1500. Two species, the New Caledonian rail and the New Caledonian lorikeet have not been seen for over a hundred years and are considered to be critically endangered if not actually extinct. A similar fate was thought to have befallen the New Caledonian owlet-nightjar, but a recent survey found them in remote areas. The New Caledonian crested gecko was thought to be extinct until it was rediscovered in 1994. Native grasses are being outcompeted by robust, introduced competitors, such as Melinis minutiflora.

The biodiversity of native tree species has protected against invasive introduced tree species, as has happened on other Pacific islands. The government created protective parks and reserves.

=== Tree cover extent and loss ===
Global Forest Watch publishes annual estimates of tree cover loss and 2000 tree cover extent derived from time-series analysis of Landsat satellite imagery in the Global Forest Change dataset. In this framework, tree cover refers to vegetation taller than 5 m (including natural forests and tree plantations), and tree cover loss is defined as the complete removal of tree cover canopy for a given year, regardless of cause.

For New Caledonia, dashboard statistics report cumulative tree cover loss of 30,555 ha (305.55 km^{2}) from 2001 to 2024 (about 2.1% of its 2000 tree cover area). For tree cover density greater than 30%, dashboard statistics report a 2000 tree cover extent of 1,440,327 ha (14,403.27 km^{2}). The charts and table below display this data. In simple terms, the annual loss number is the area where tree cover disappeared in that year, and the extent number shows what remains of the 2000 tree cover baseline after subtracting cumulative loss. Forest regrowth is not included in the dataset.

Annual tree cover loss in New Caledonia, 2001–2024. View chart definition.
Tree cover extent in 2000 minus cumulative tree cover loss in New Caledonia, 2001–2024 (loss-only residual; does not account for gain). View chart definition.

Annual tree cover extent and loss
Year	Tree cover extent (km2) (Note: This residual measure does not include forest regrowth.)	Annual tree cover loss (km2)
2001	14,396.29	6.98
2002	14,390.02	6.27
2003	14,381.18	8.84
2004	14,366.09	15.09
2005	14,351.38	14.71
2006	14,330.04	21.34
2007	14,320.28	9.76
2008	14,315.06	5.22
2009	14,305.30	9.76
2010	14,299.80	5.50
2011	14,292.71	7.09
2012	14,284.32	8.39
2013	14,261.50	22.82
2014	14,241.00	20.50
2015	14,236.14	4.86
2016	14,222.90	13.24
2017	14,211.29	11.61
2018	14,180.59	30.70
2019	14,172.48	8.11
2020	14,131.82	40.66
2021	14,125.26	6.56
2022	14,121.51	3.75
2023	14,115.54	5.97
2024	14,097.72	17.82

== Preservation ==
New Caledonia is considered a conservation priority by many environmental organizations, which have lobbied to preserve the islands' unique ecosystems. To date they have failed to achieve definitive protection for New Caledonia's remaining natural areas. For instance, all attempts to grant them UNESCO World Heritage Site-status protection failed, due to opposition by regional governments and mining and development interests. Mining continues to expand in sensitive areas, although mining companies perform minimal rehabilitation after a mine closes. However, even when taking such rehabilitation efforts into account, mining activity devastates the local biodiversity. World Heritage Site-status would limit mining activity in areas of ecological importance, affecting employment and government revenues.

Grass-roots conservation efforts have been tentative at best, and invariably failed when in direct conflict with mining and other development projects. Recent efforts to increase habitat protection met with strong official opposition, and violence against the proponents. Notably, Bruno Van Peteghem, recipient of the 2001 Goldman Environmental Prize, used the local court system to force government leaders to obey laws protecting the region's coral reefs. After winning in court, his home was firebombed, and his family was repeatedly threatened. Ultimately, the head of government, Jacques Lafleur, succeeded in silencing Van Peteghem, forcing him into de facto exile by arranging the termination of his employment with the national airline.

The entirety of New Caledonia's EEZ is officially a marine protected area, the Natural Park of the Coral Sea. Levels of protection within the EEZ differ, 2.4% is highly protected, with economic activities including fishing and mining being legal in the remainder. On 18 October 2023 the government announced the highly protected area would be expanded to cover 10% of the EEZ.

== Gallery ==
=== Landscapes ===
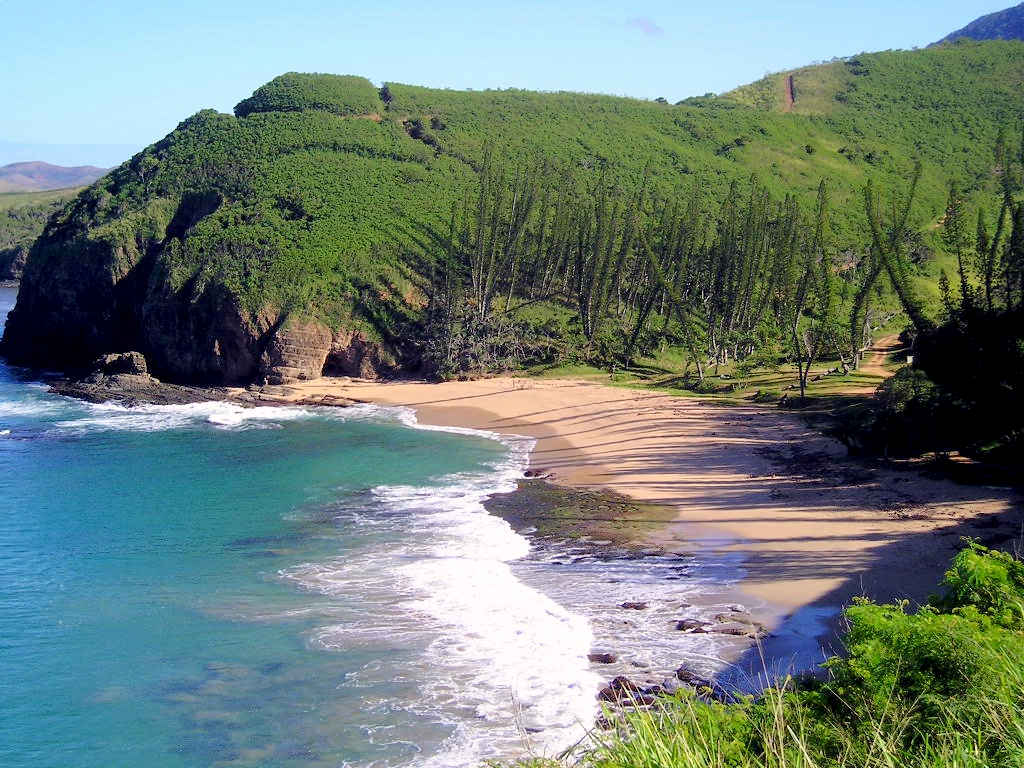
Des Tortues bay (Bay of the turtles), in Bourail coast

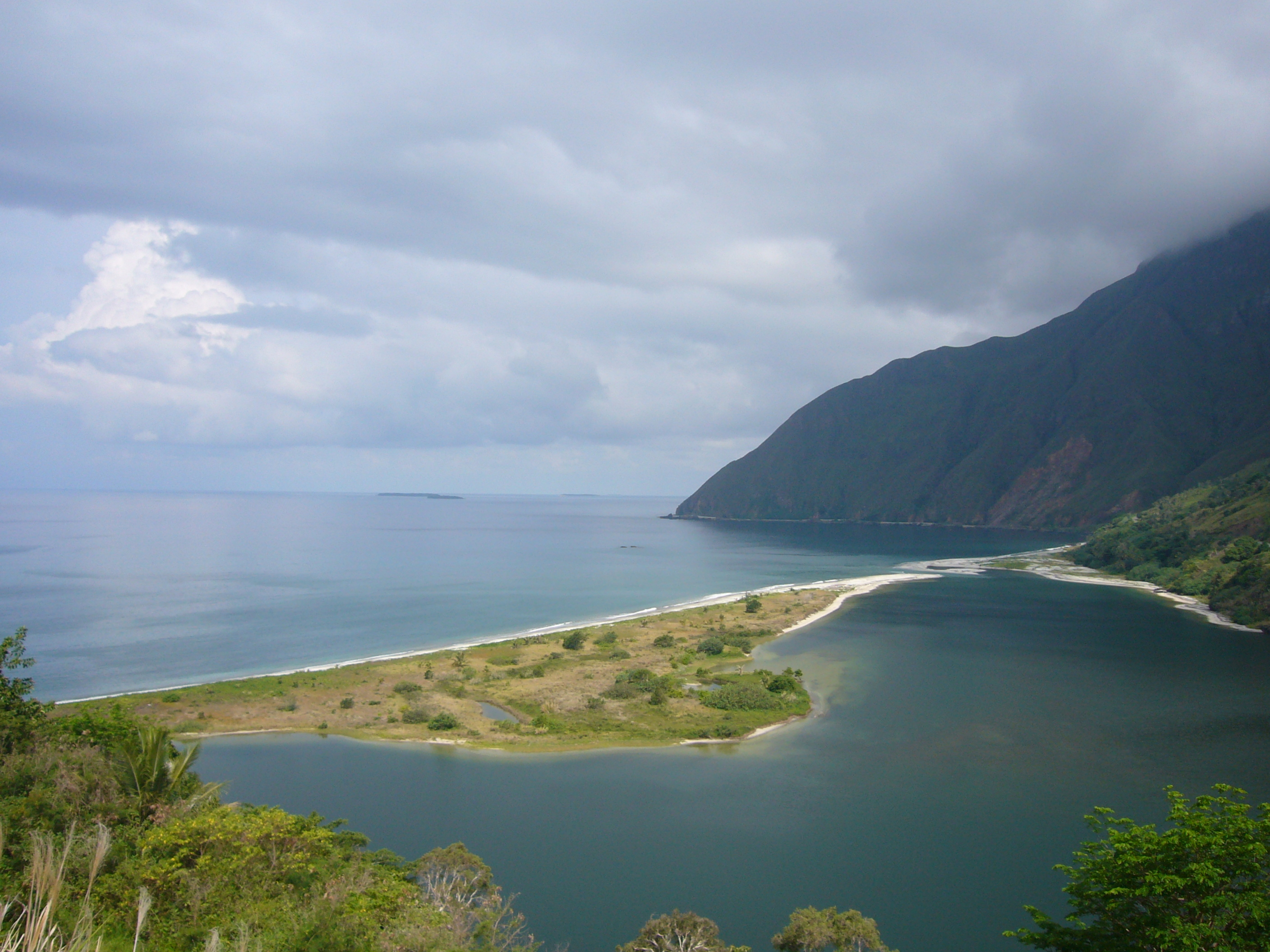
Ouaieme river mouth

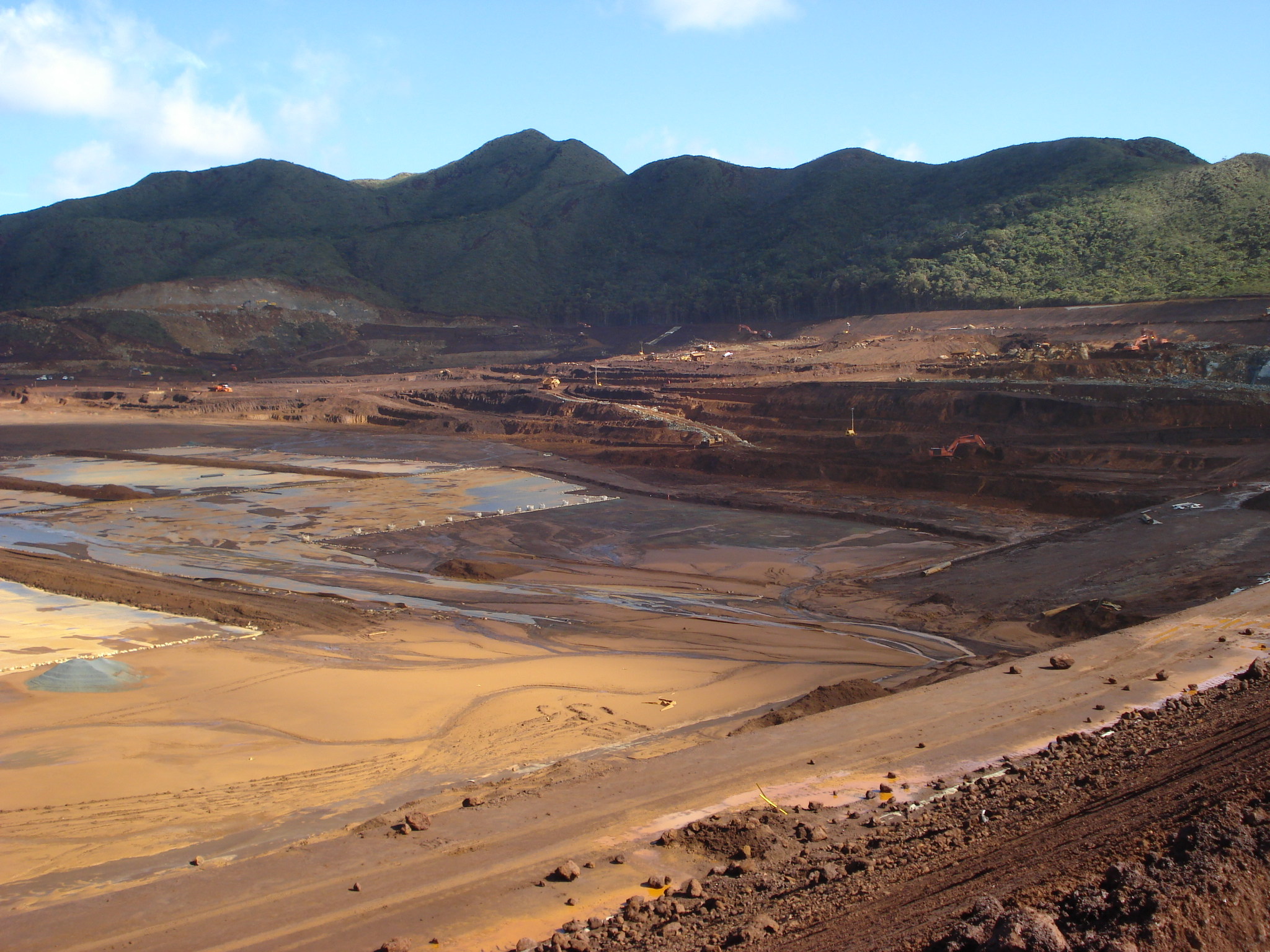
Construction of a tailings storage area Goro Nickel Mine, Kwe West Bassin

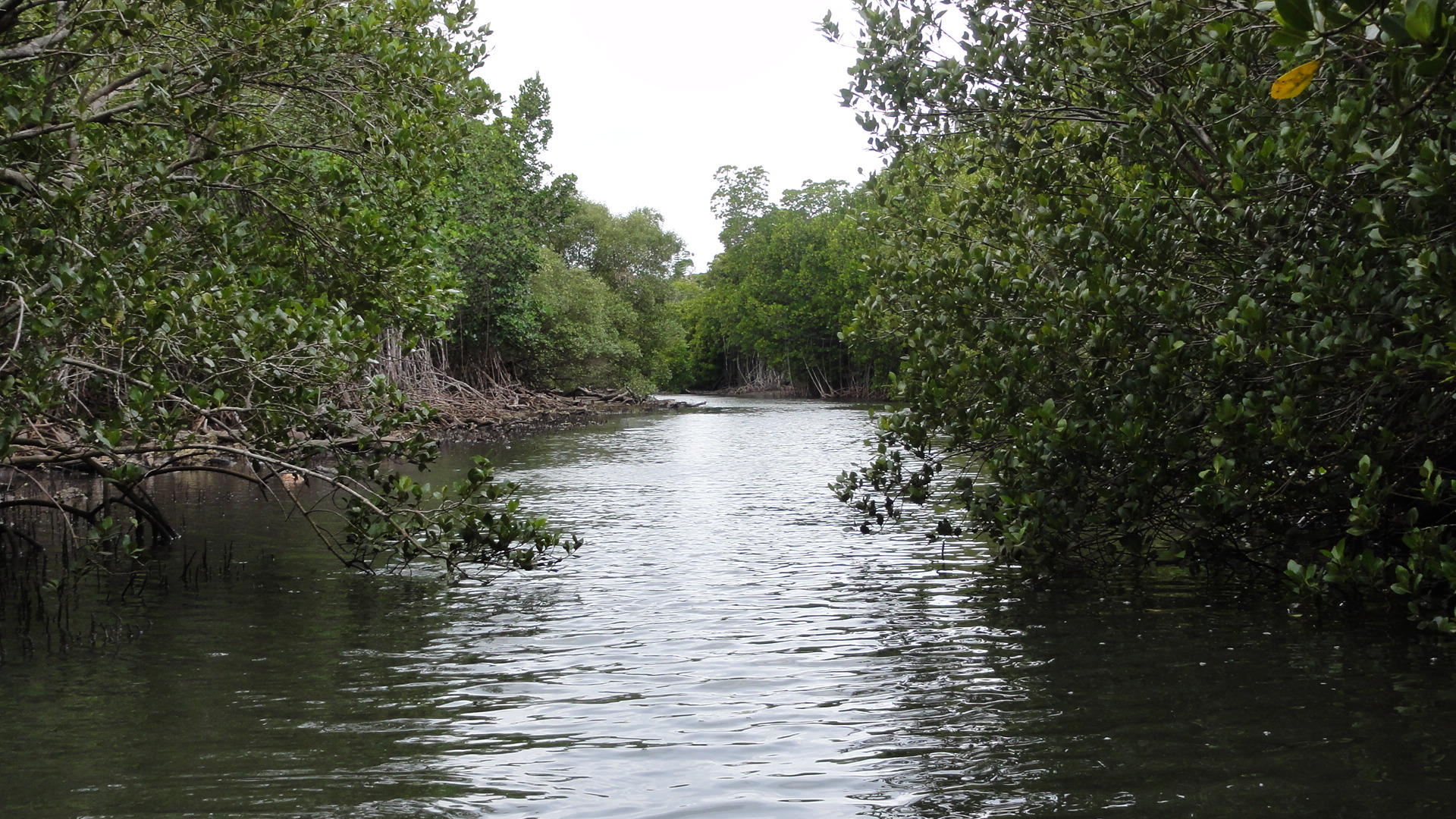
Mangrove in Creek salé

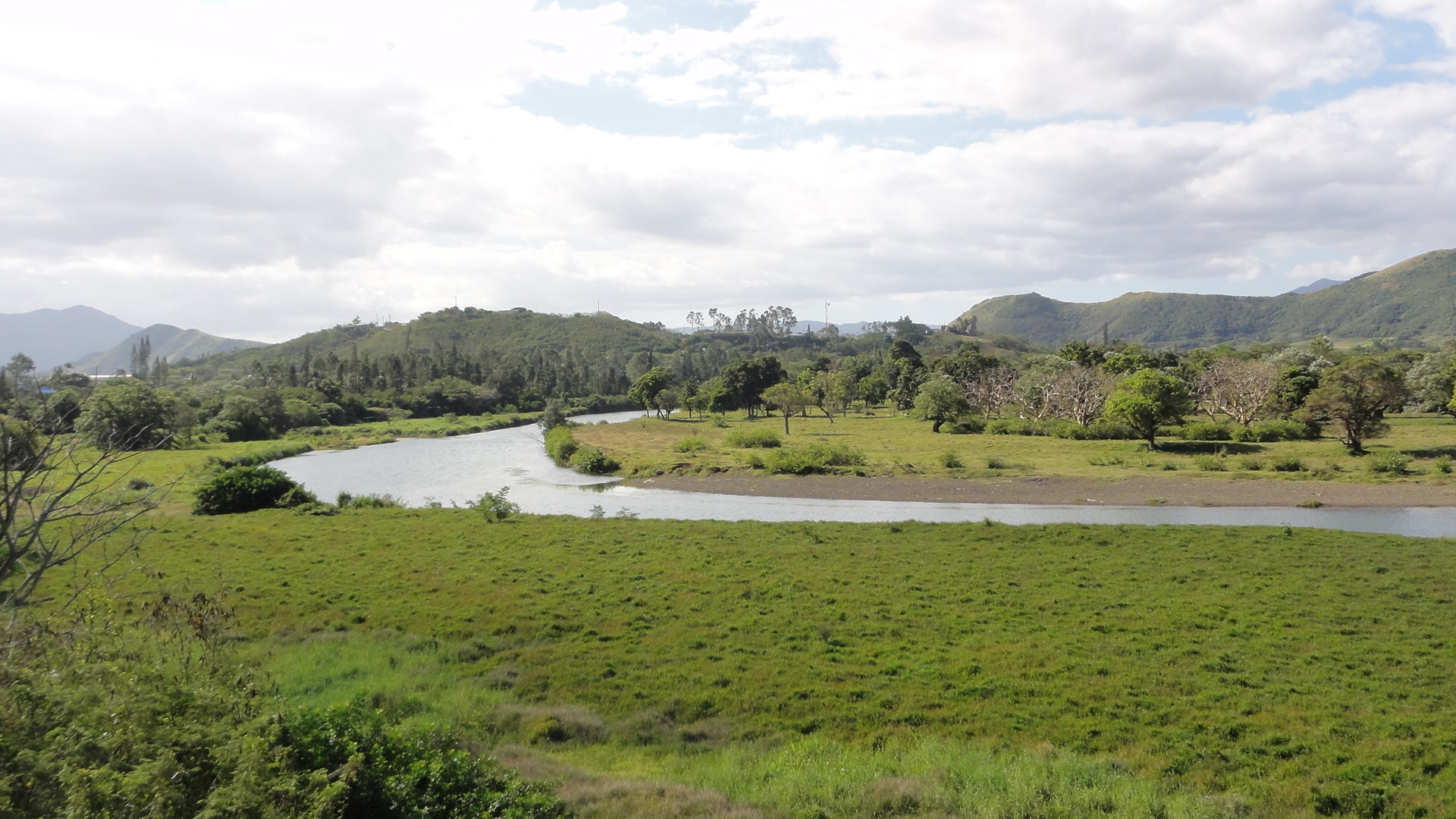
River Néra plaine

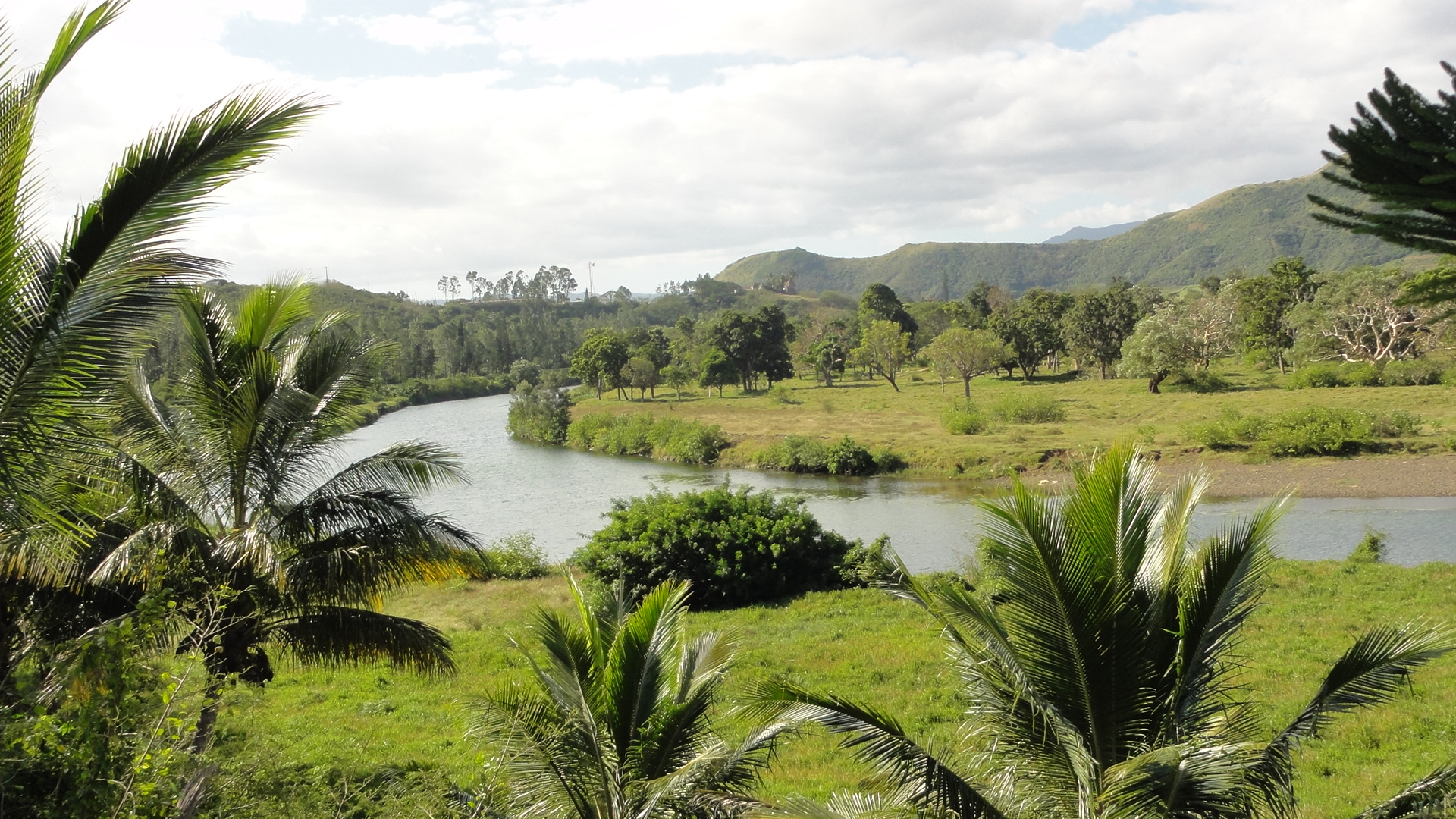
Vegetation surrounding river Néra

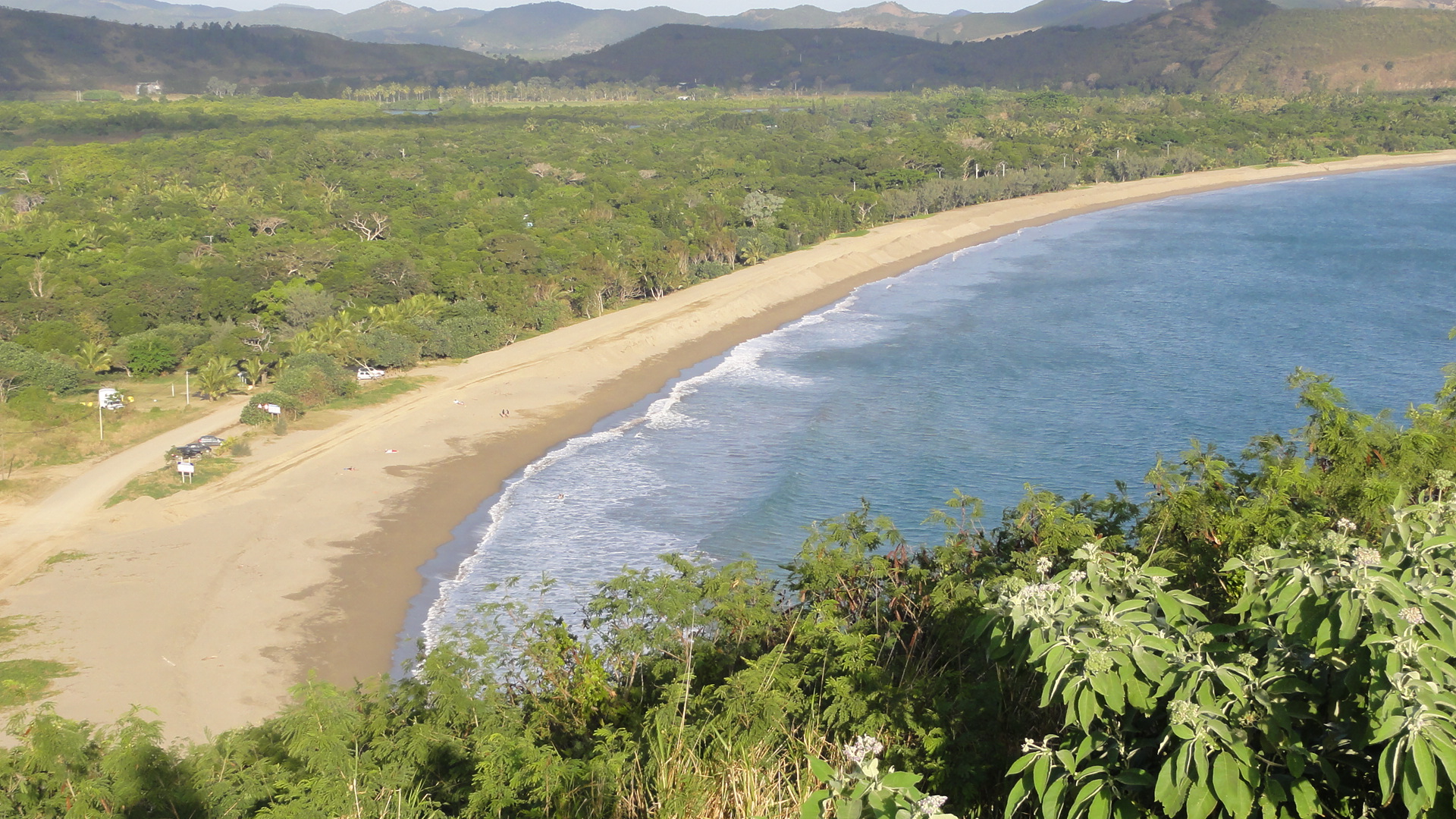
Roche percée beach

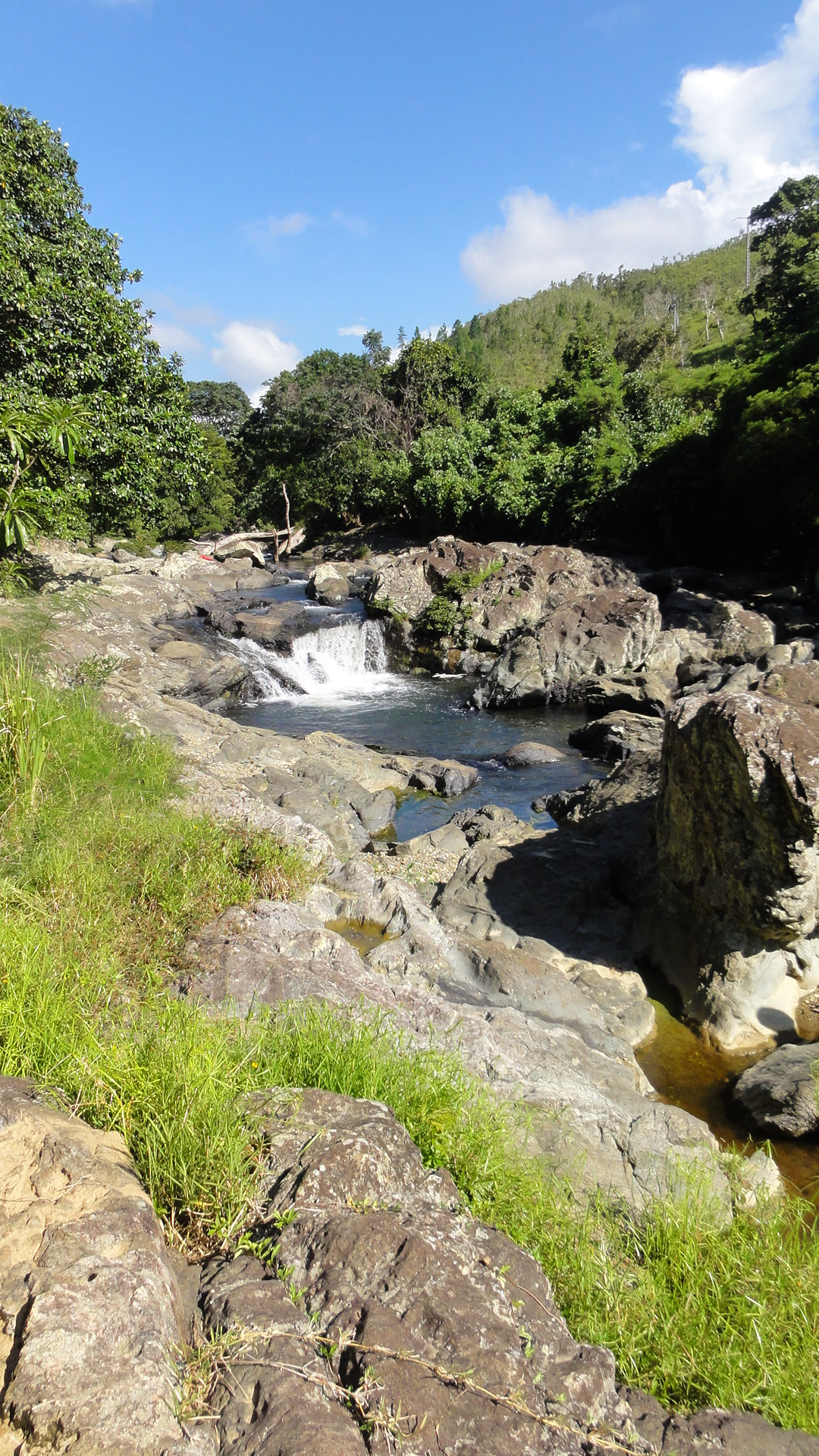
Poindimié Creek

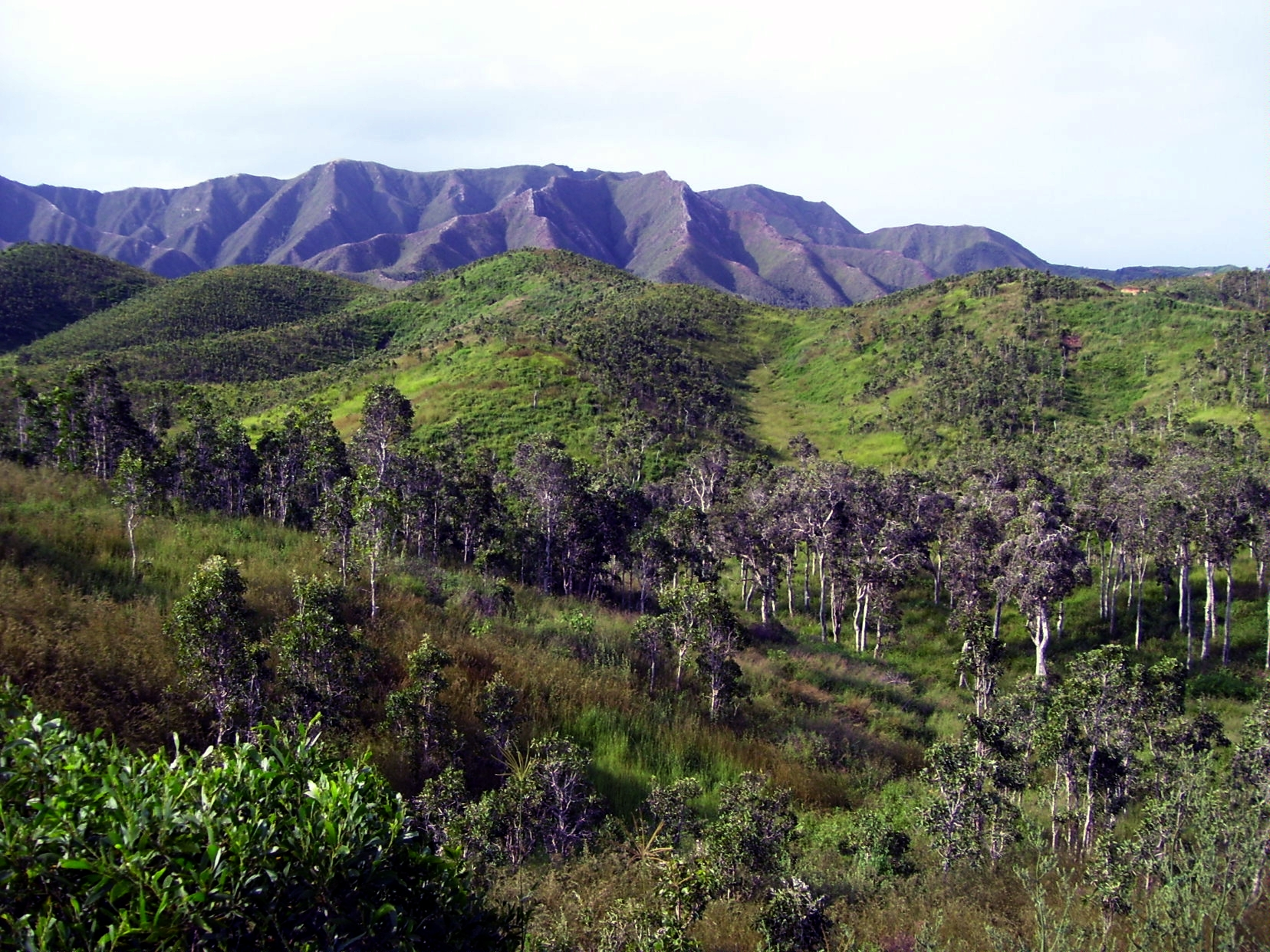
Savanna with Niaouli trees in the north of west coast, in Malabou

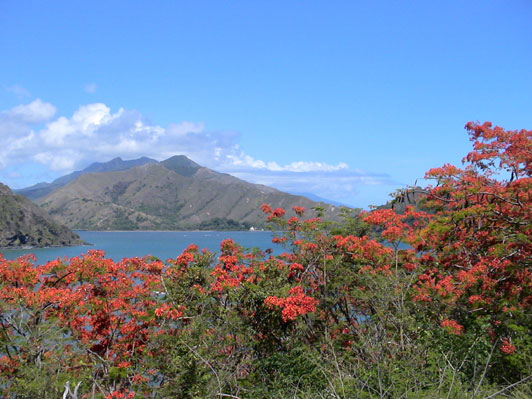
Mont Panie Vista

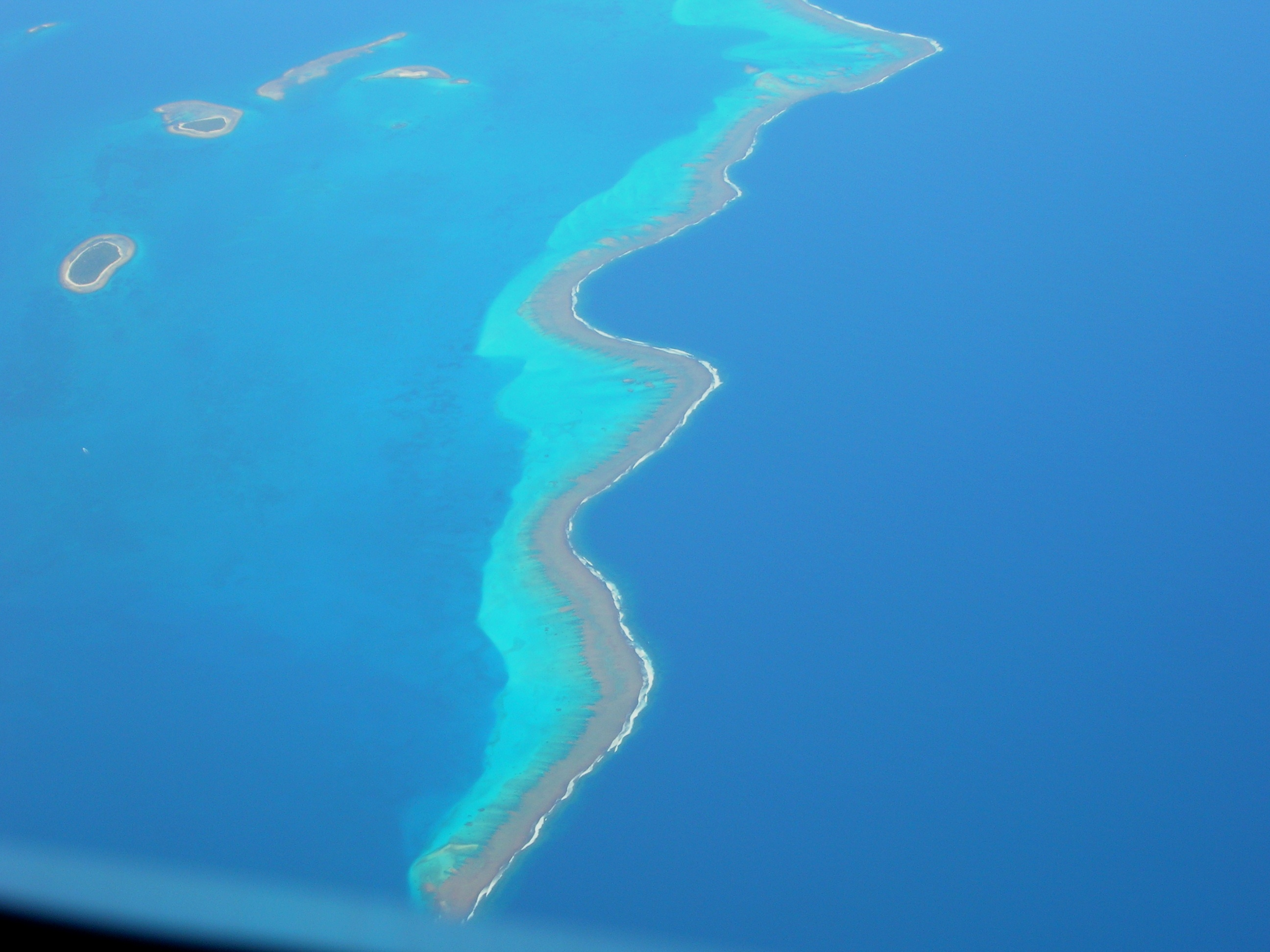
Aerial photographs of Annibal reef and islets

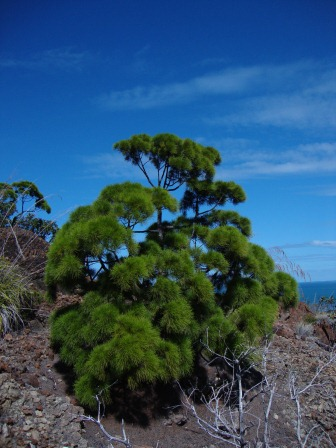
Maquis minier bush in Tiébaghi Mountain (Koumac)

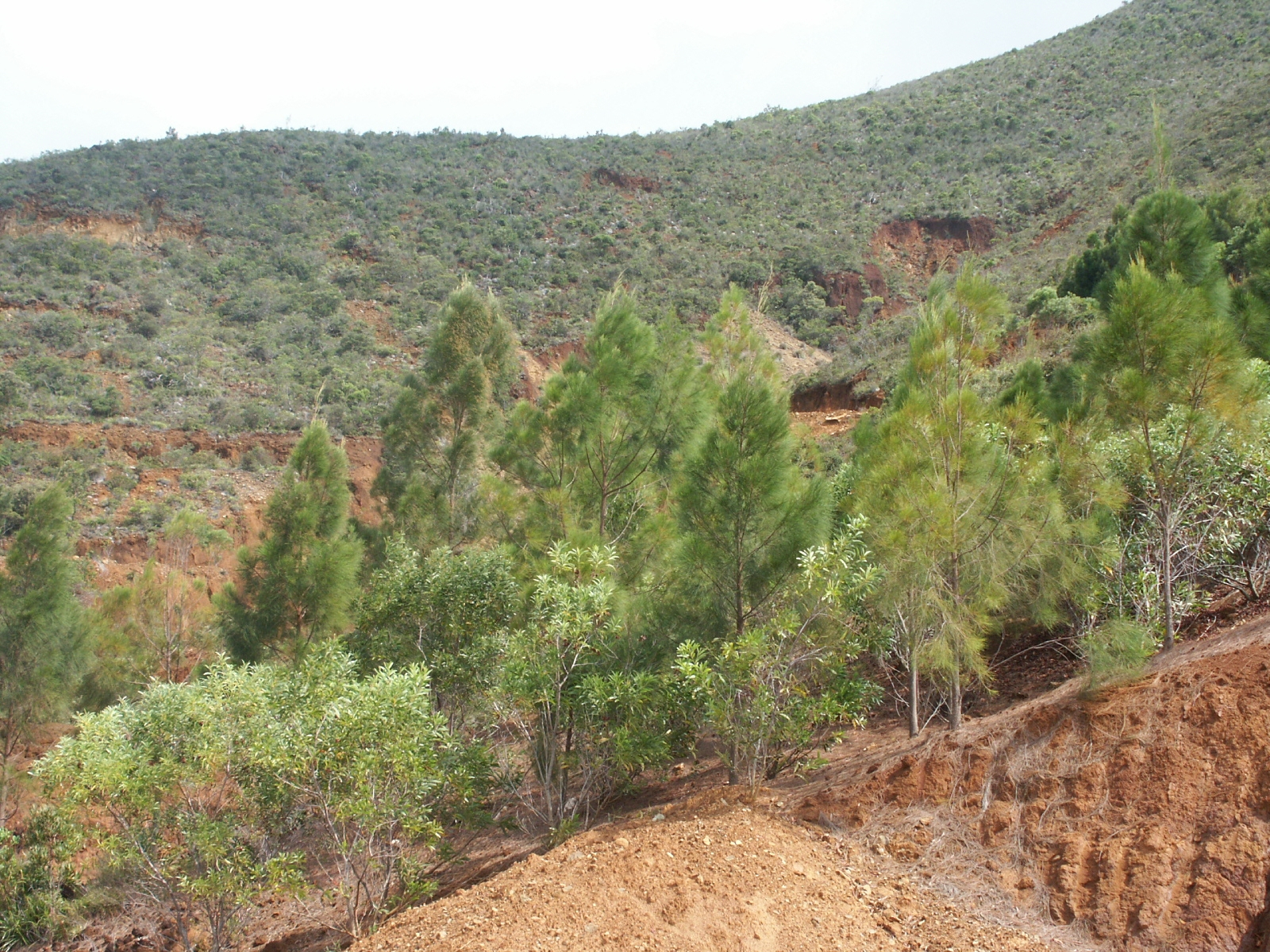
Casuarina collina (iron wood) and Acacia spirorbis (false guaiac) about seven years in a rehabilitation of mining lands - Commune of Montdore - South Province

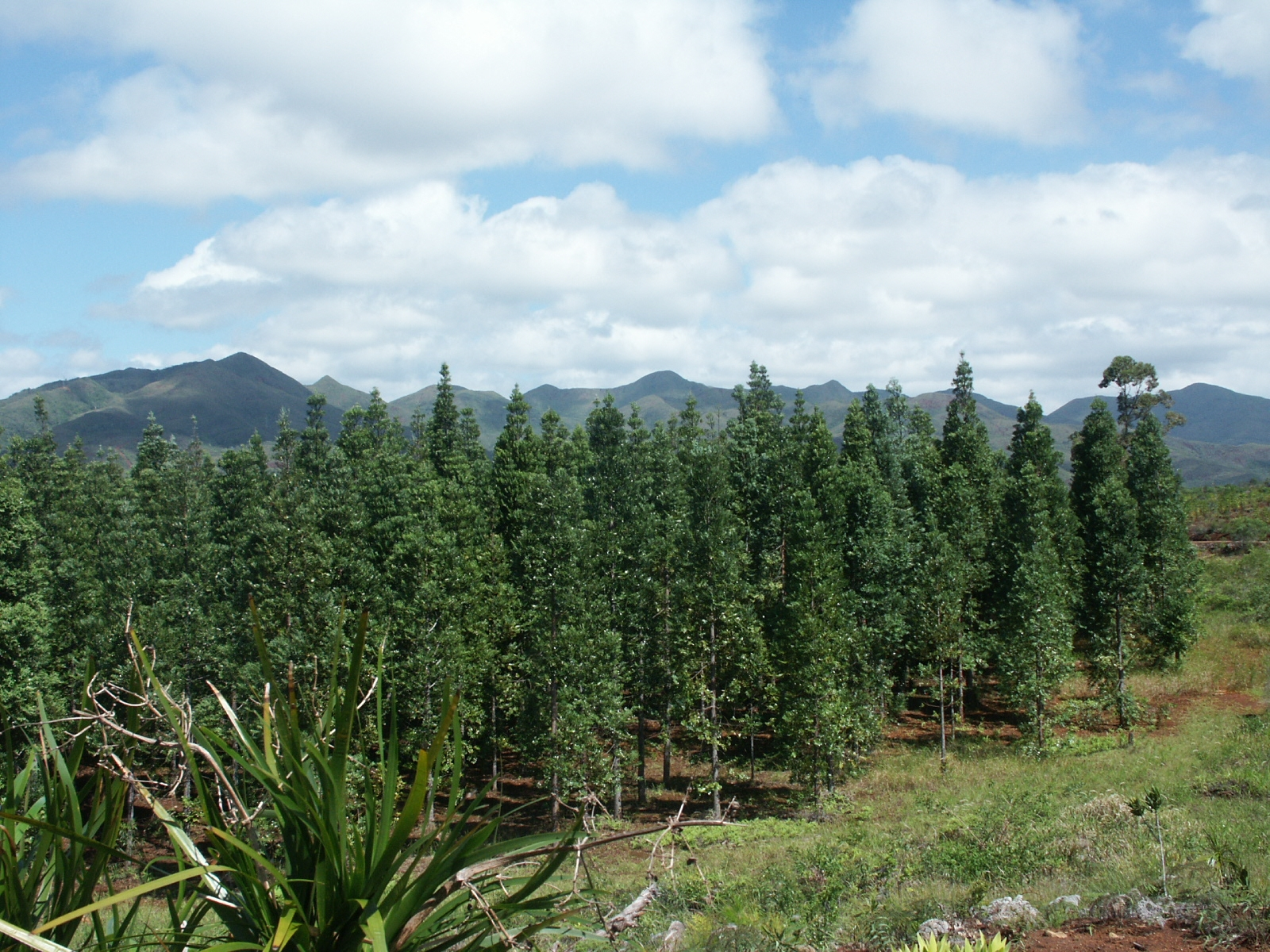
Agathis lanceolata plantation

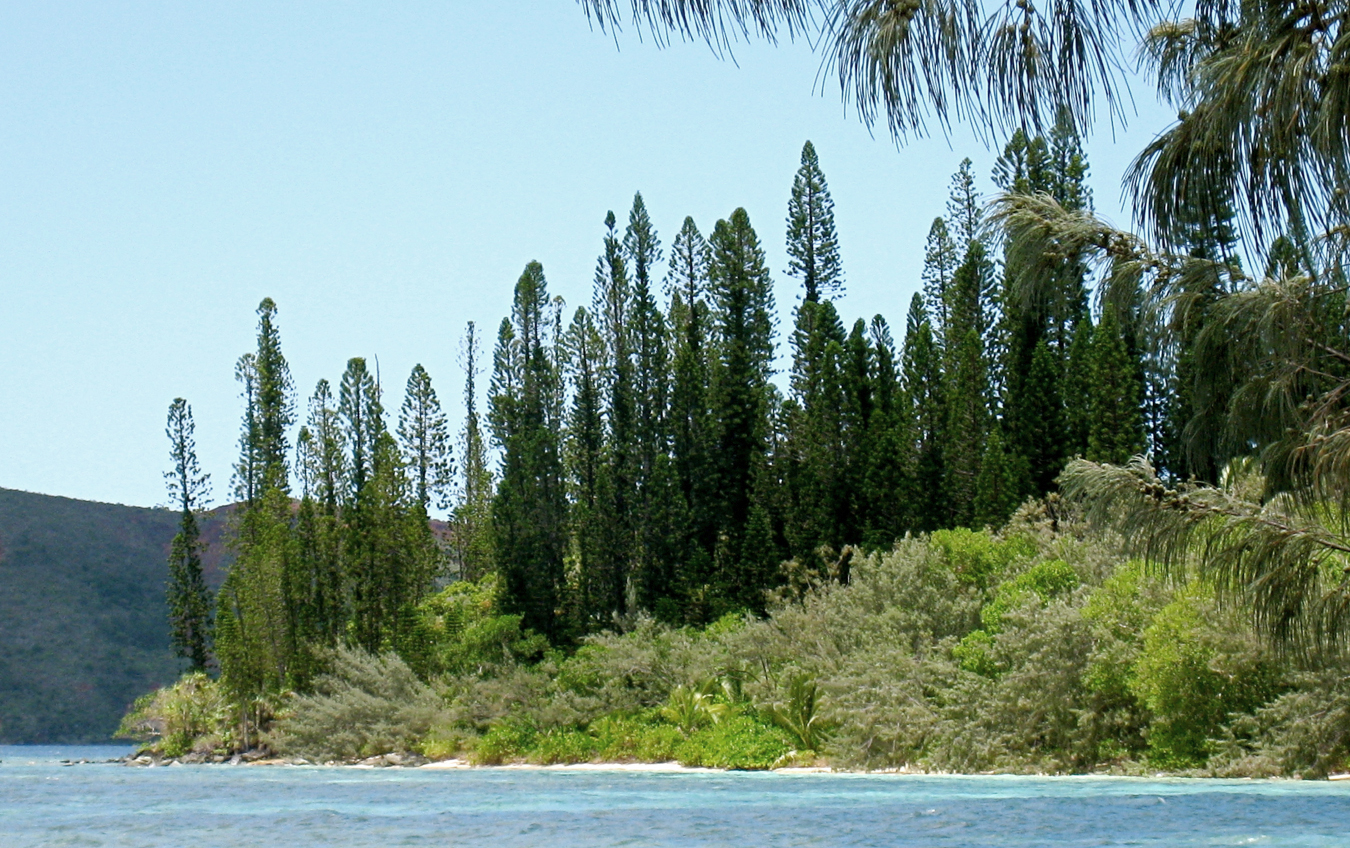
Araucaria columnaris habitat

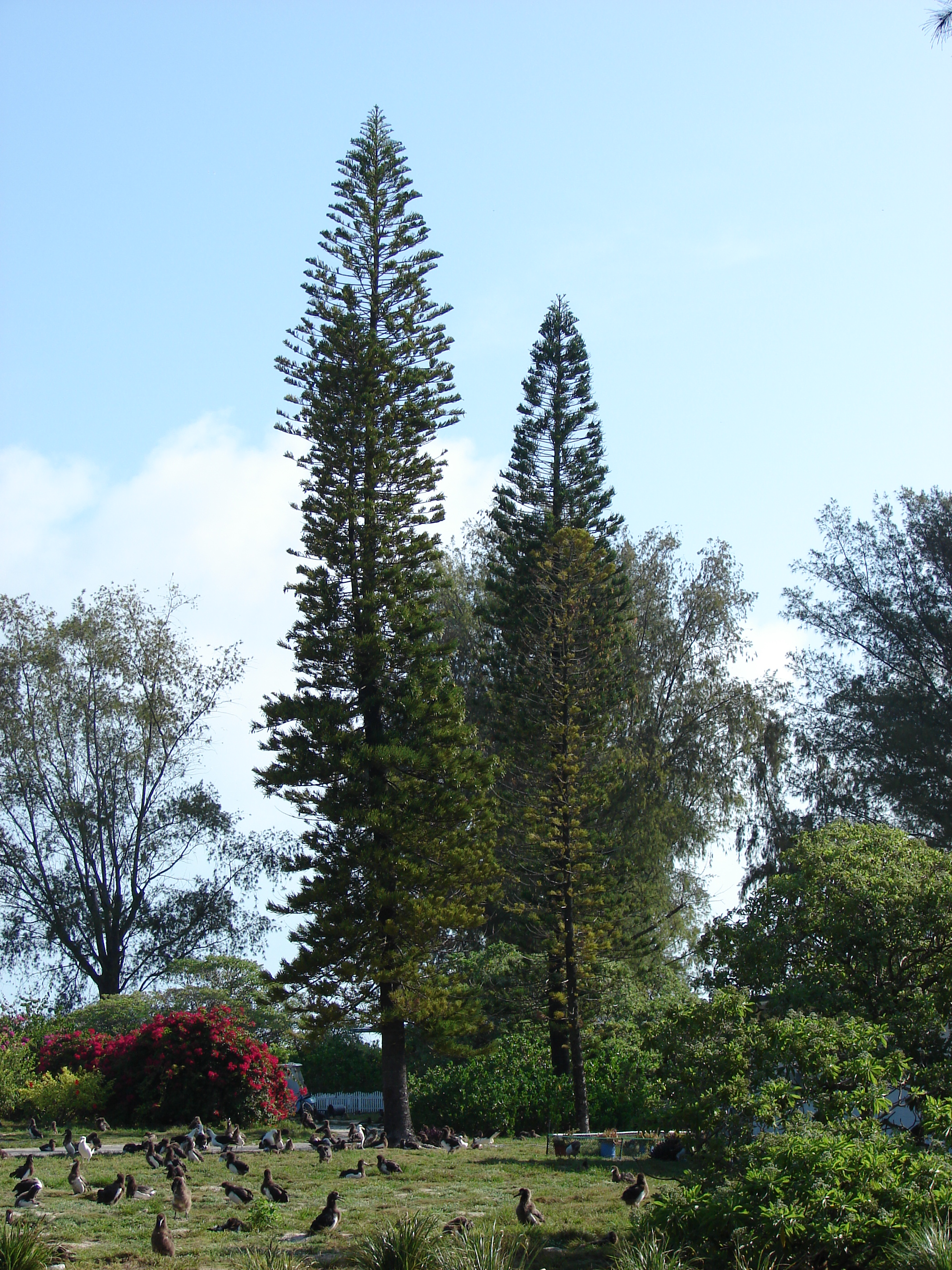
Araucaria columnaris with Laysan albatross. Located in Midway Atoll, Commodore Ave cul de sac residences Sand Island.

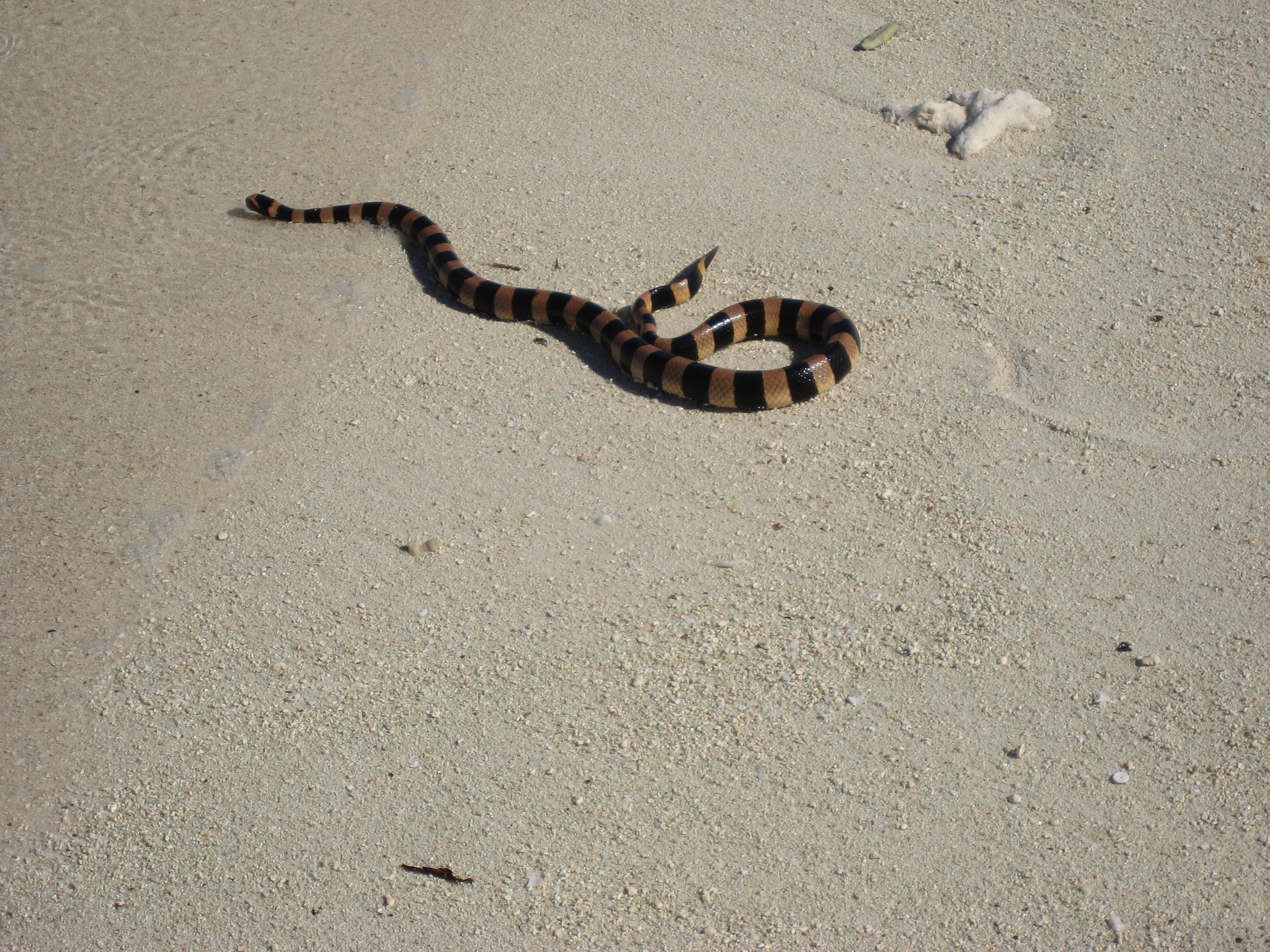
Sea snake (Laticauda sp) in Lighthouse Amédée islet

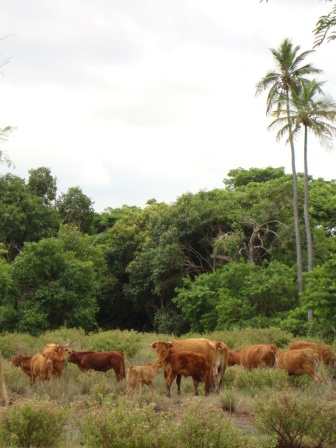
Livestock in Koumac

=== Coral reef fish ===
A few examples of coral reef fish; all photographs here are from New Caledonian specimens.

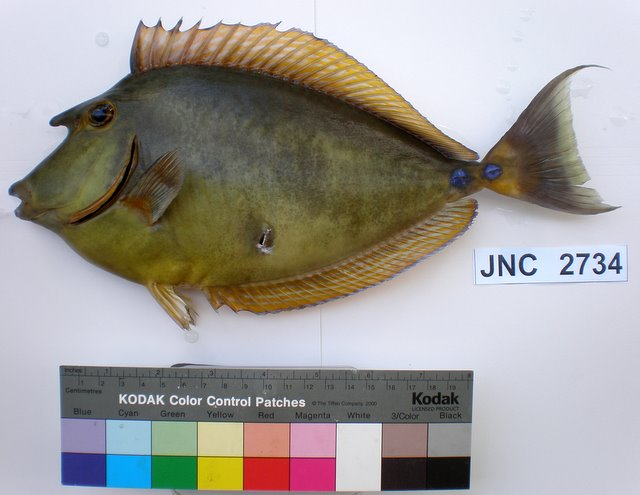
Naso unicornis

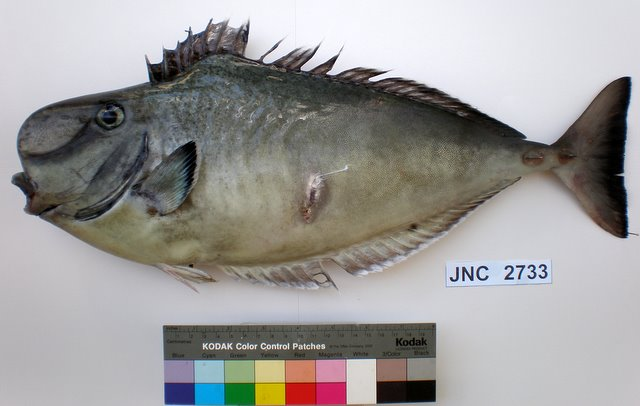
Naso tonganus

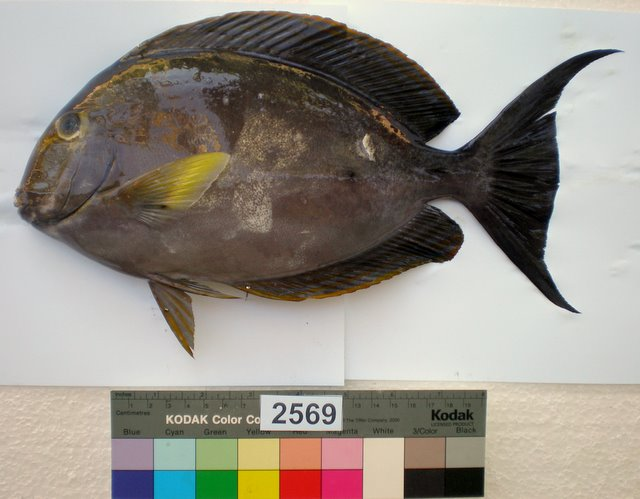
Acanthurus xanthopterus

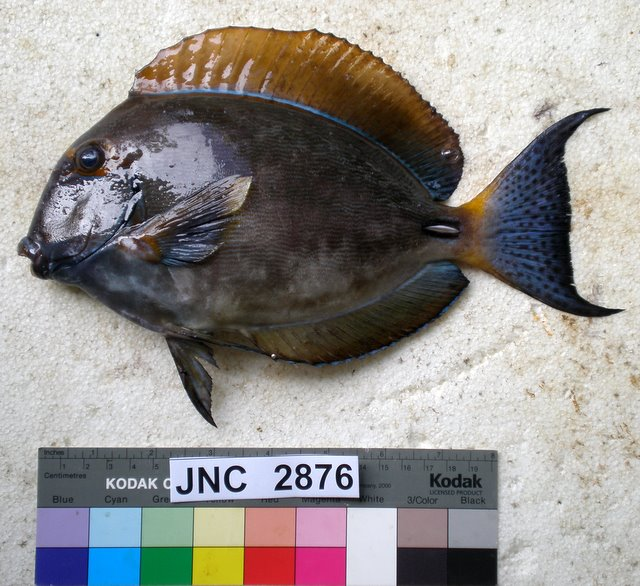
Acanthurus dussumieri

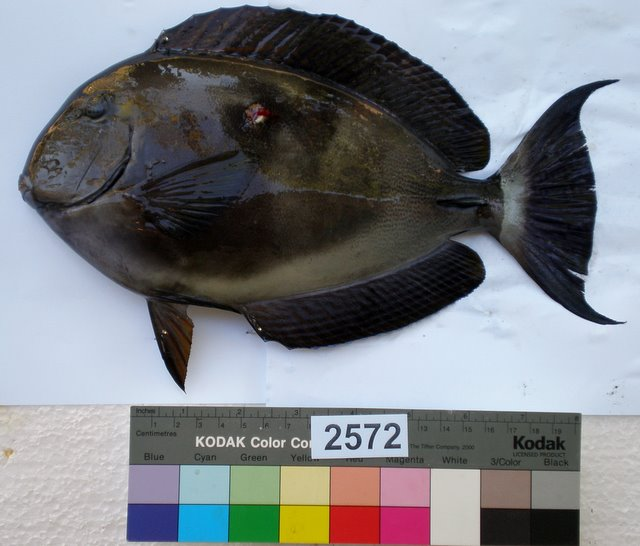
Acanthurus blochii

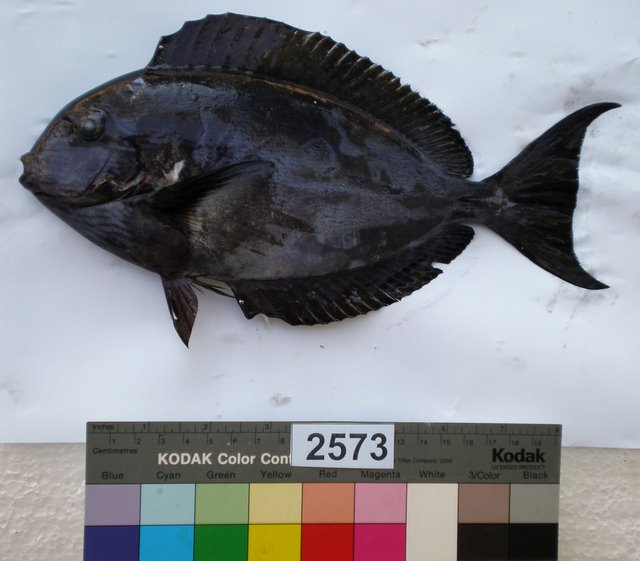
Acanthurus albipectoralis

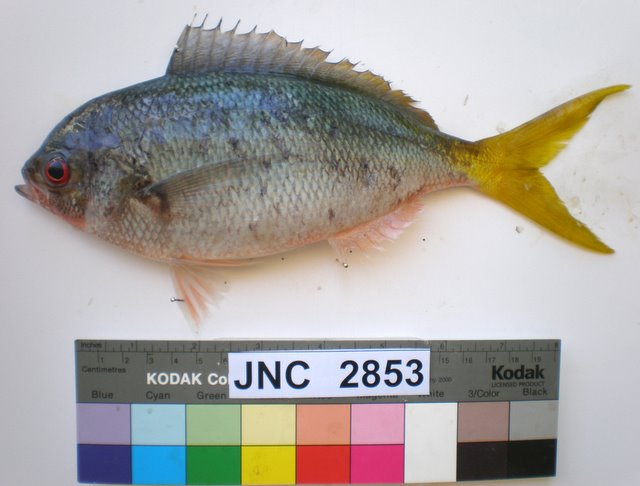
Caesio cuning

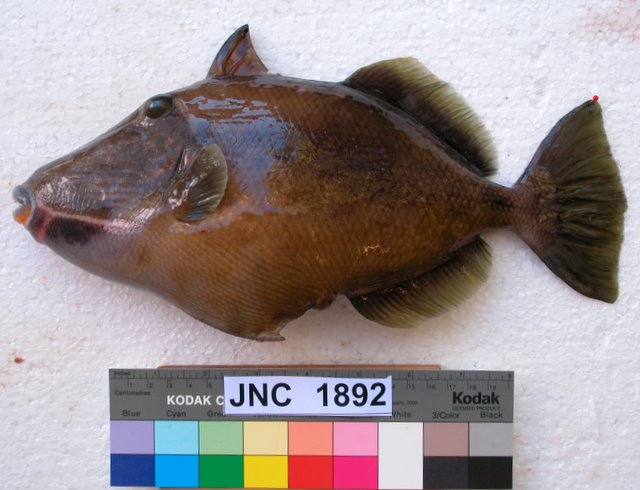
Sufflamen fraenatum

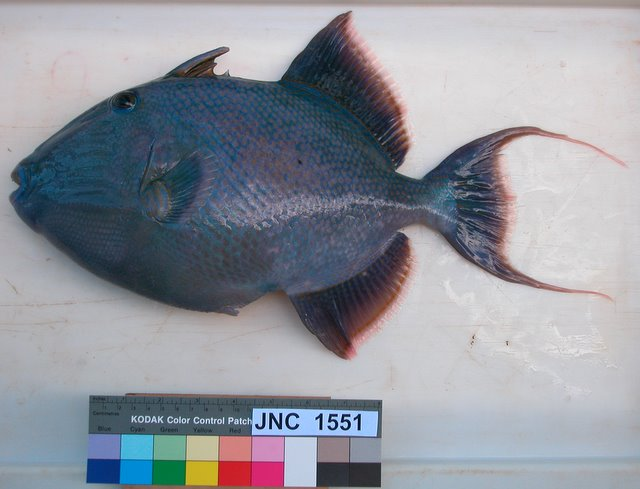
Pseudobalistes fuscus

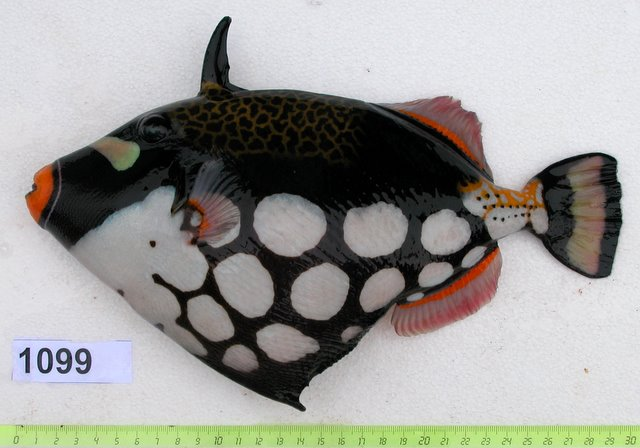
Balistoides conspicillum

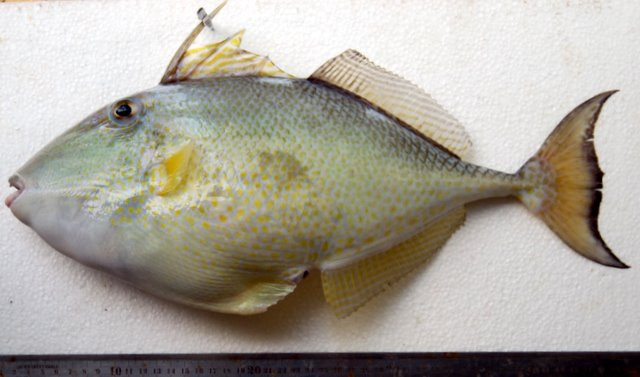
Abalistes stellatus

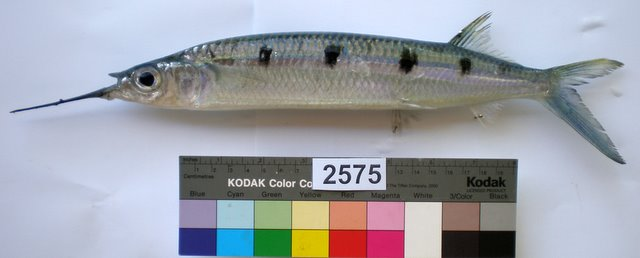
Hemiramphus far

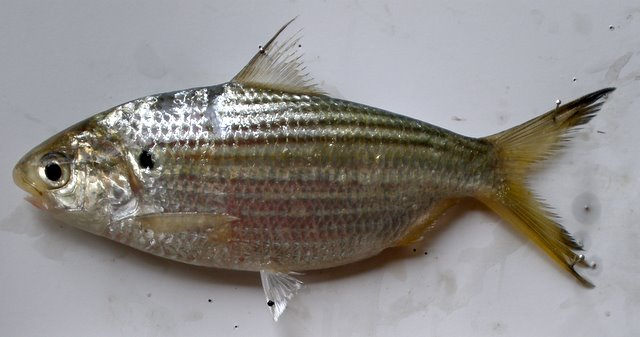
Anodontostoma chacunda

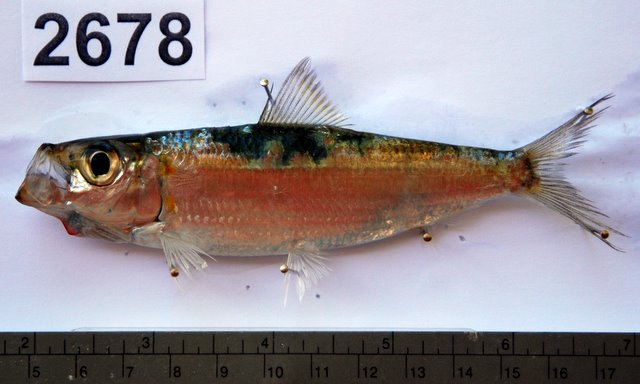
Herklotsichthys quadrimaculatus

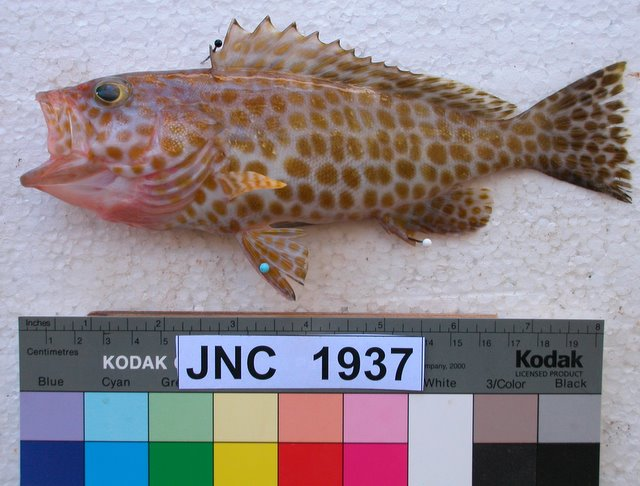
Epinephelus areolatus

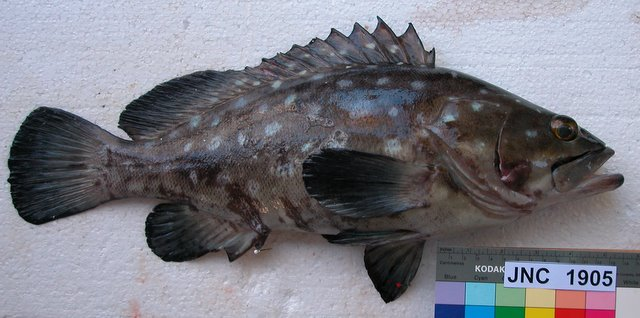
Epinephelus coeruleopunctatus

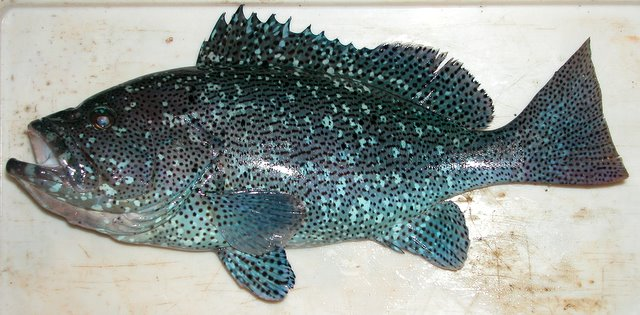
Epinephelus cyanopodus

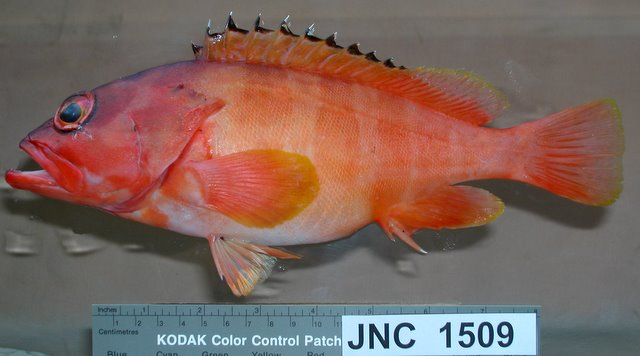
Epinephelus fasciatus

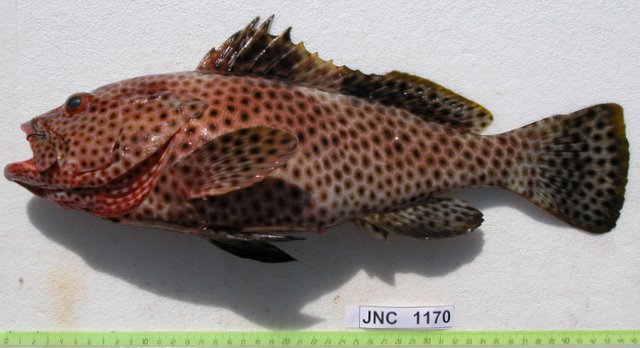
Epinephelus maculatus

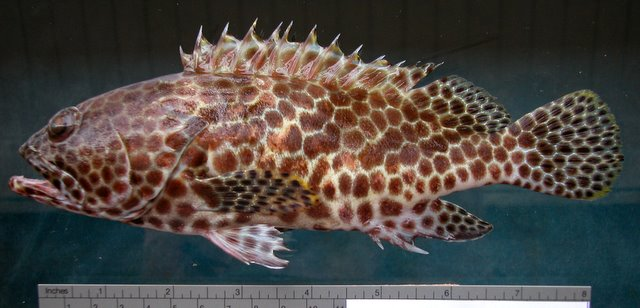
Epinephelus merra

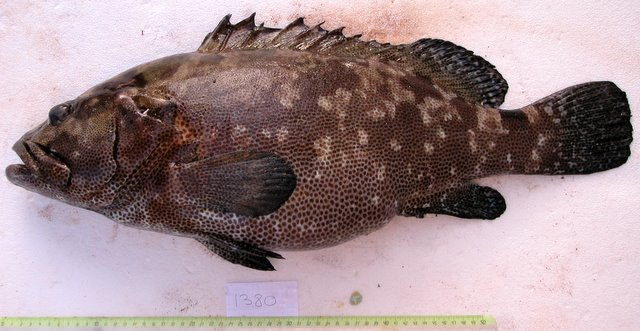
Epinephelus polyphekadion

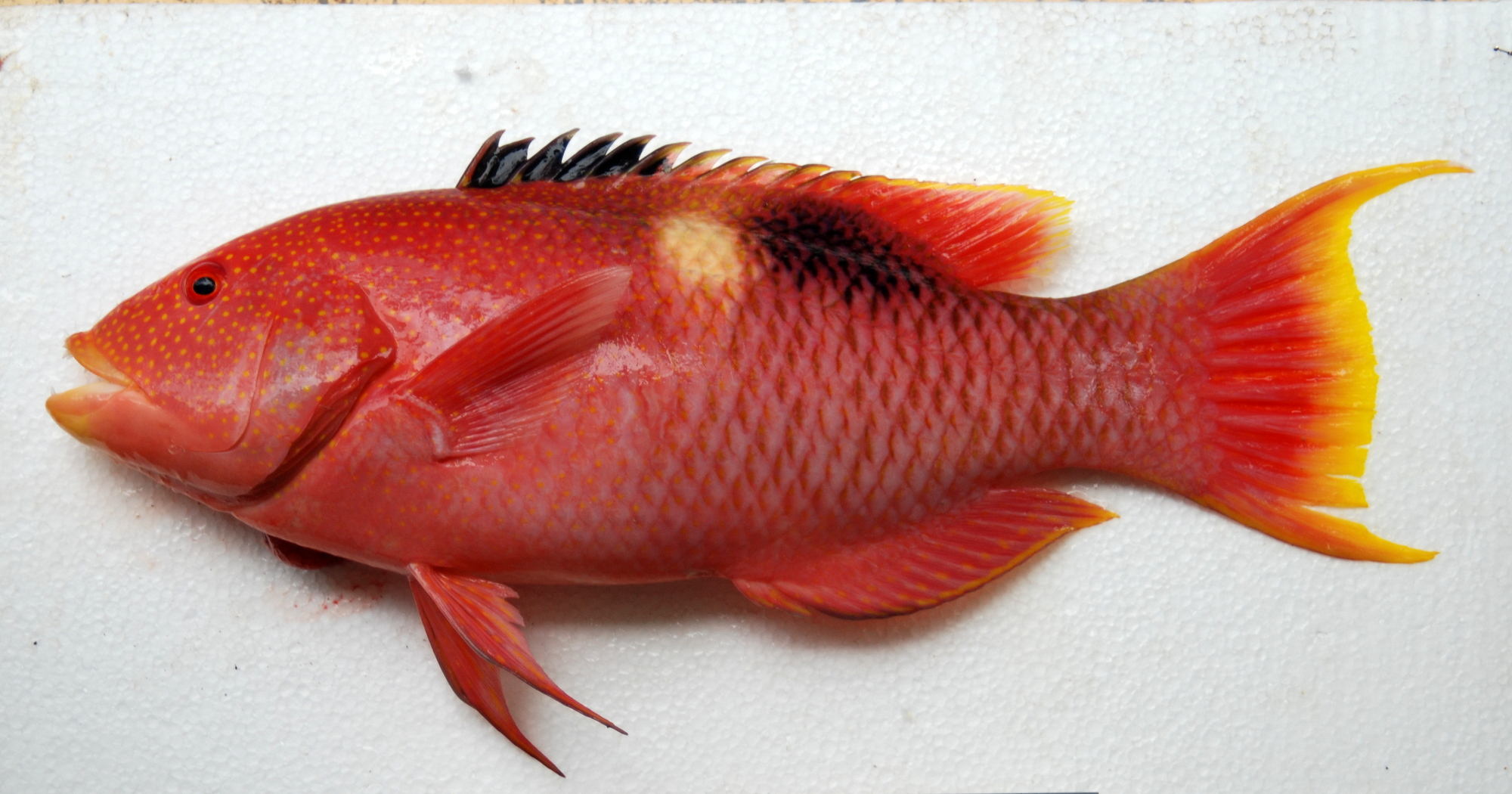
Bodianus perditio.

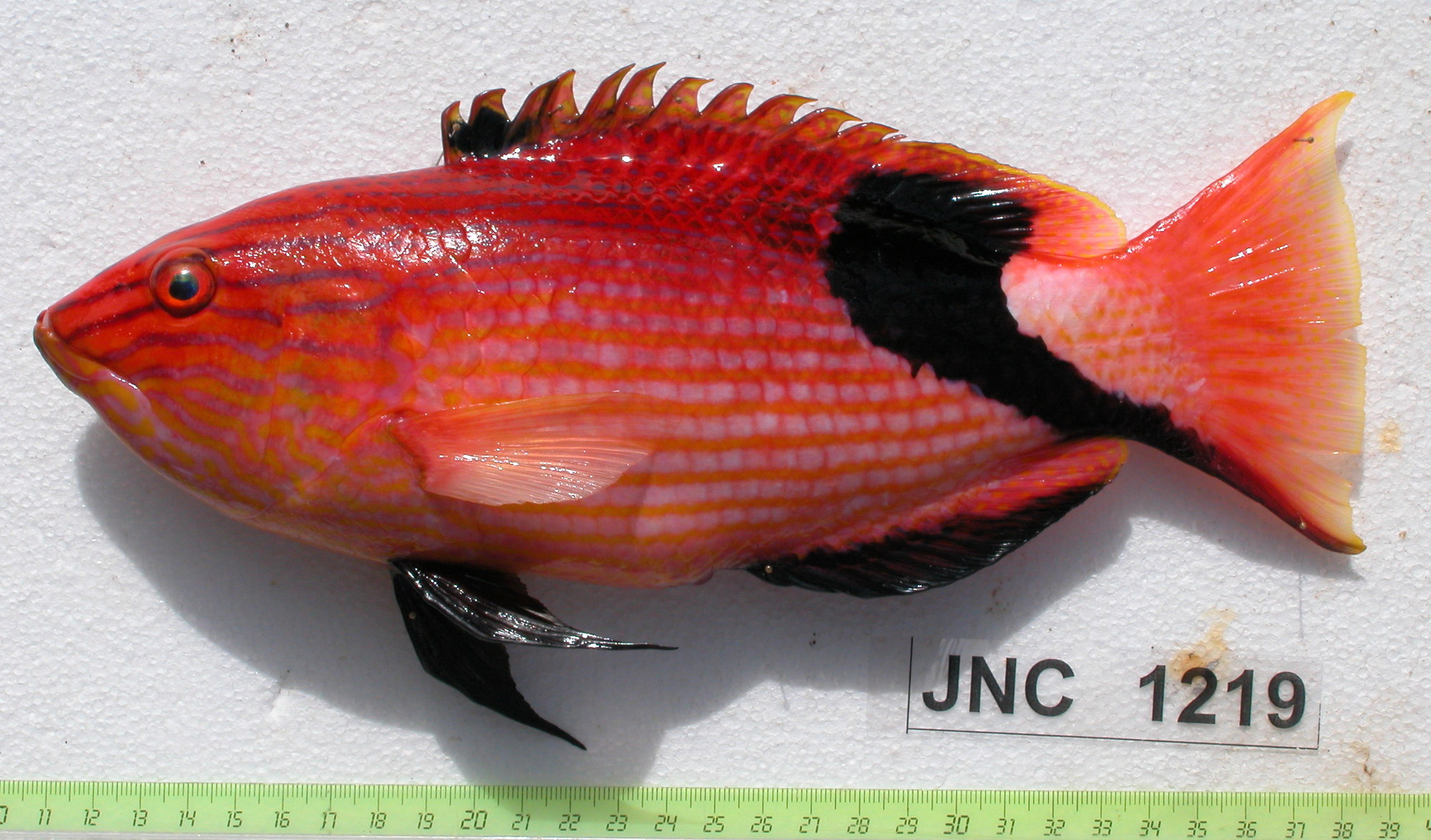
Bodianus loxozonus.

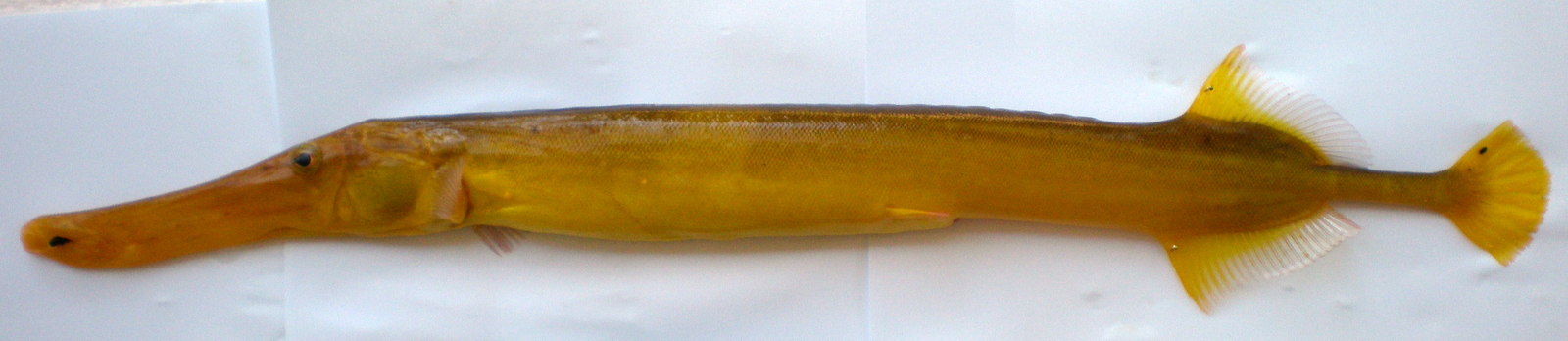
Aulostomus chinensis.

== See also ==
- Paleobotany
