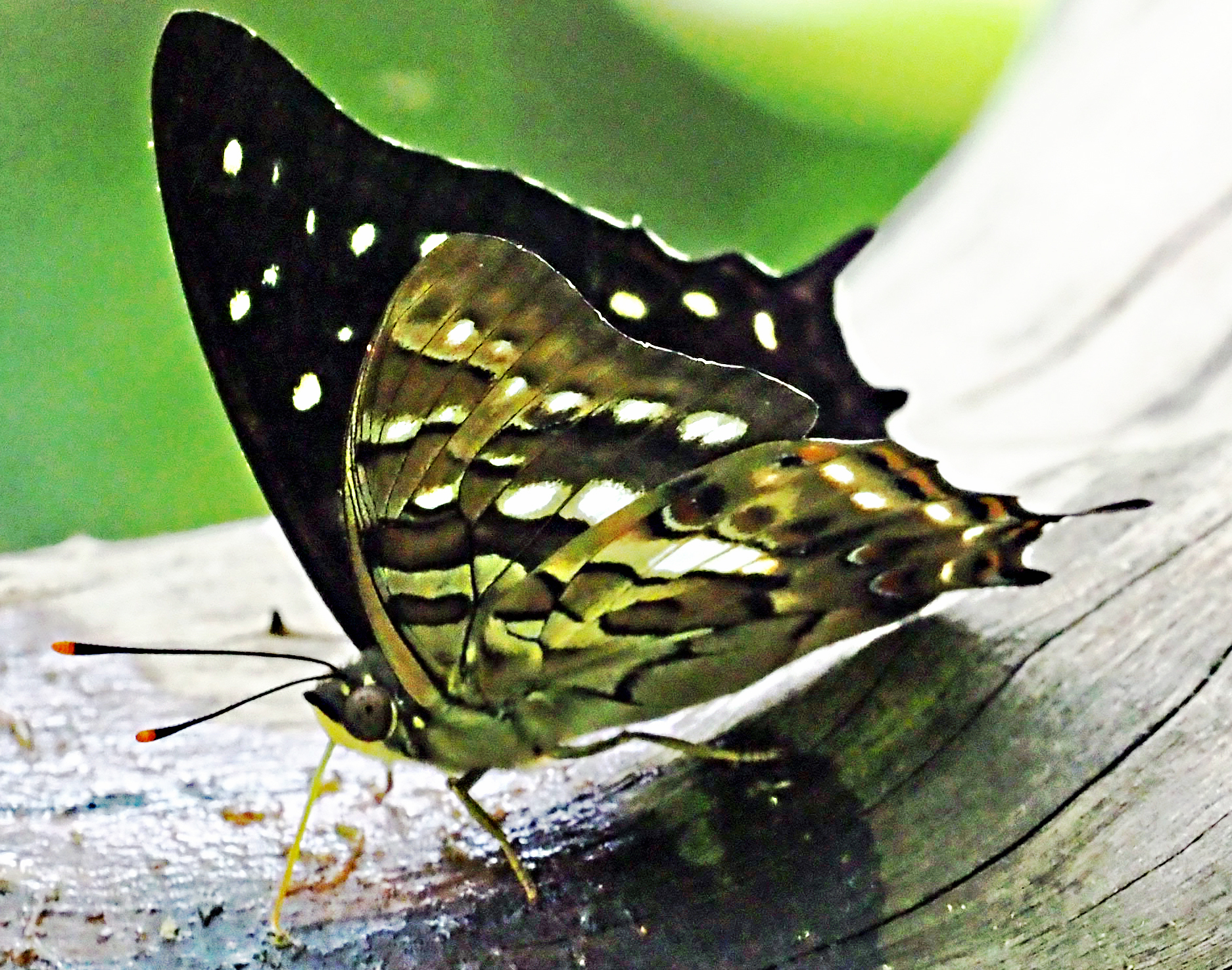
- Polyura gamma (male)
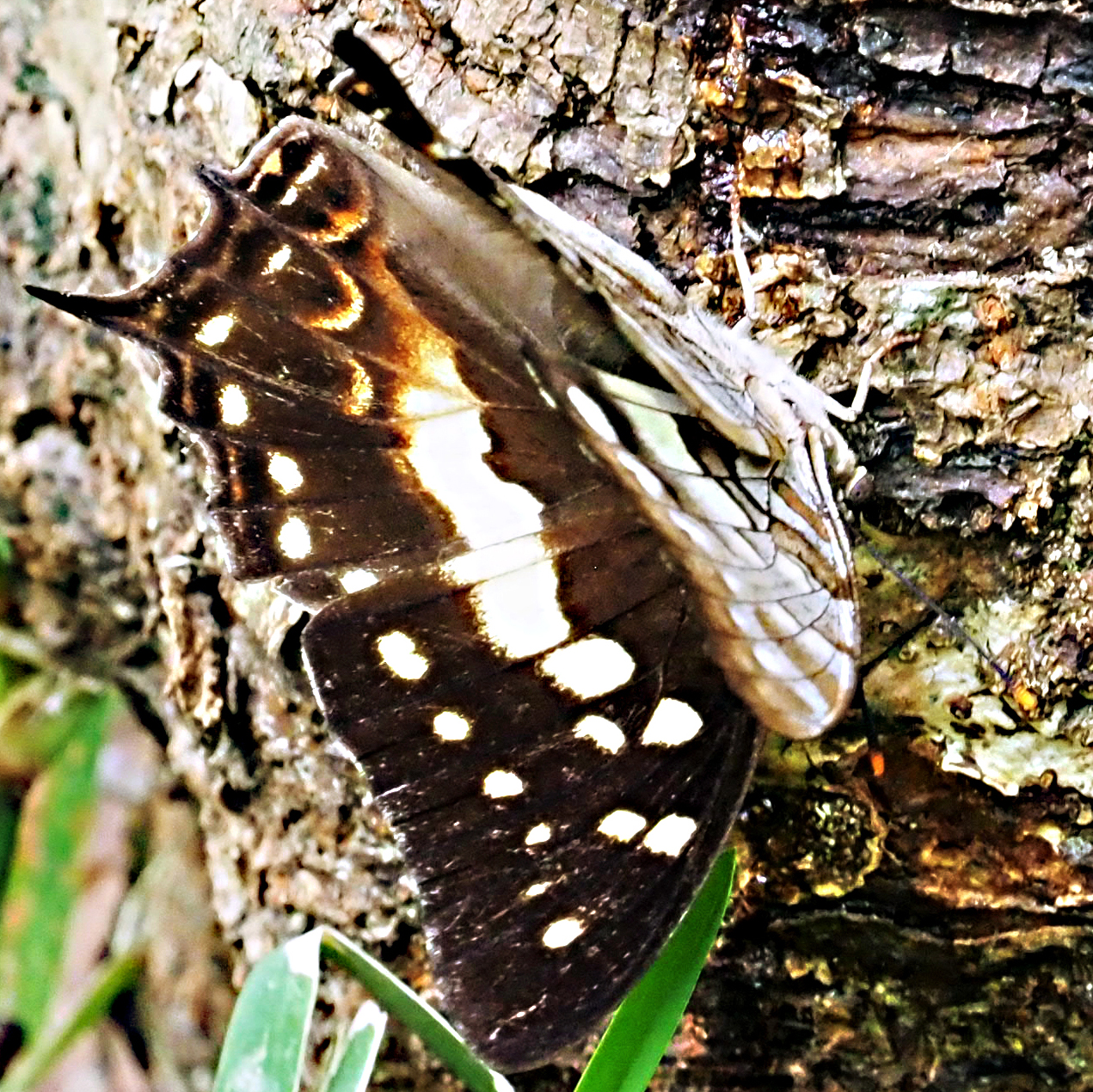

Scientific classification
- Kingdom: Animalia
- Phylum: Arthropoda
- Class: Insecta
- Order: Lepidoptera
- Family: Nymphalidae
- Genus: Charaxes
- Species: C. gamma

Binomial name
- Charaxes gamma (Lathy, 1898)

Synonyms
- Polyura gamma; Eriboea aristophanes Fruhstorfer, 1913

= Polyura gamma =

Species of butterfly

Charaxes (Polyura) gamma is a butterfly in the family Nymphalidae. It was described by Percy Ireland Lathy in 1898. It is endemic to New Caledonia.

== Description ==
E. gamma Lathy, is the smallest Eriboea. Above blackish-brown with a short narrow cream-coloured median band and some indistinct, diffuse submarginal spots. Under surface with bands of vandyke-brown and blackish colour and shades. Only two males known, now in the British Museum. Patria probably New Caledonia or the New Hebrides.
