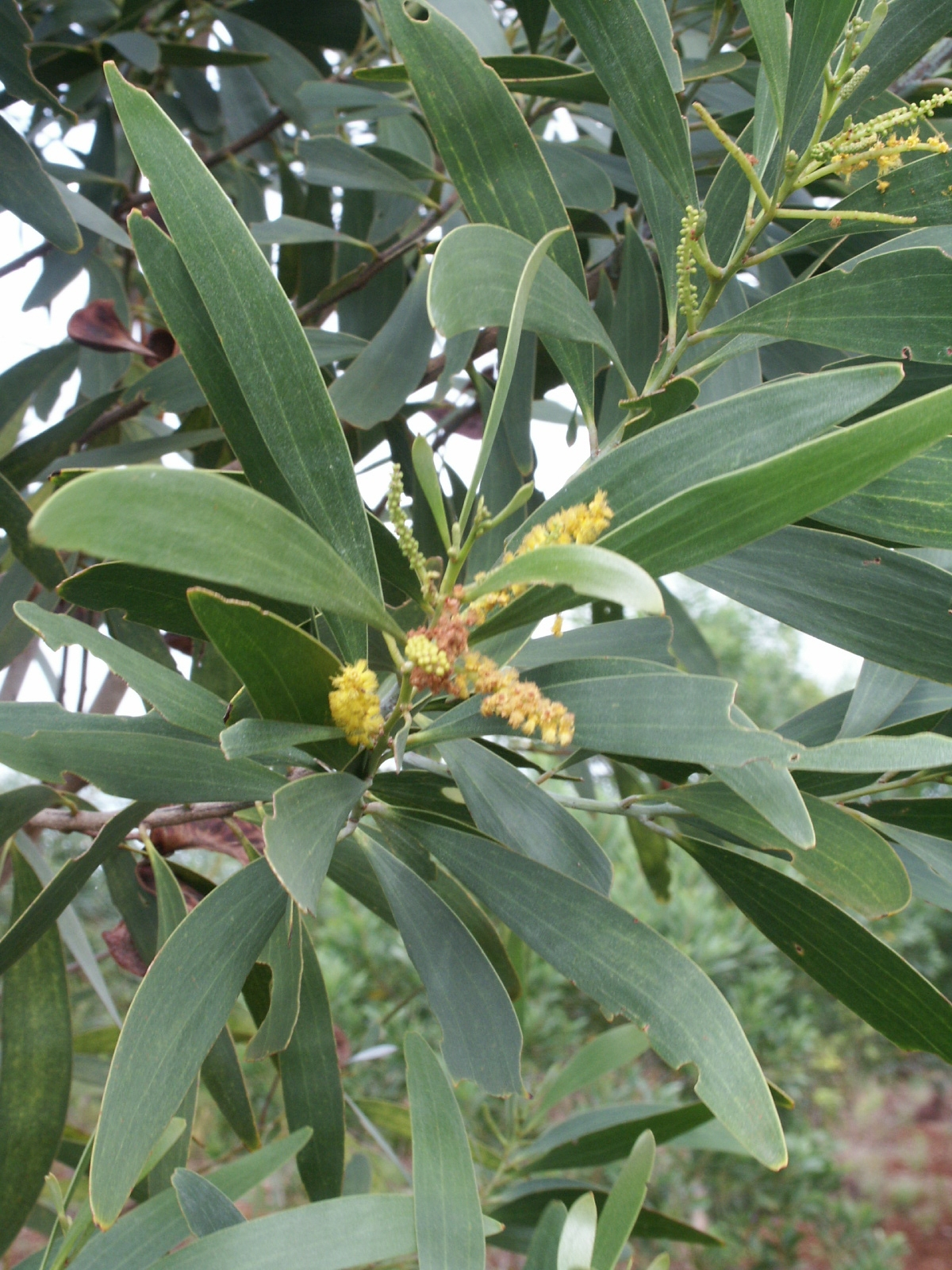

Conservation status
- Least Concern (IUCN 3.1)

Scientific classification
- Kingdom: Plantae
- Clade: Embryophytes
- Clade: Tracheophytes
- Clade: Angiosperms
- Clade: Eudicots
- Clade: Rosids
- Order: Fabales
- Family: Fabaceae
- Subfamily: Caesalpinioideae
- Clade: Mimosoid clade
- Genus: Acacia
- Species: A. spirorbis

Binomial name
- Acacia spirorbis Labill.
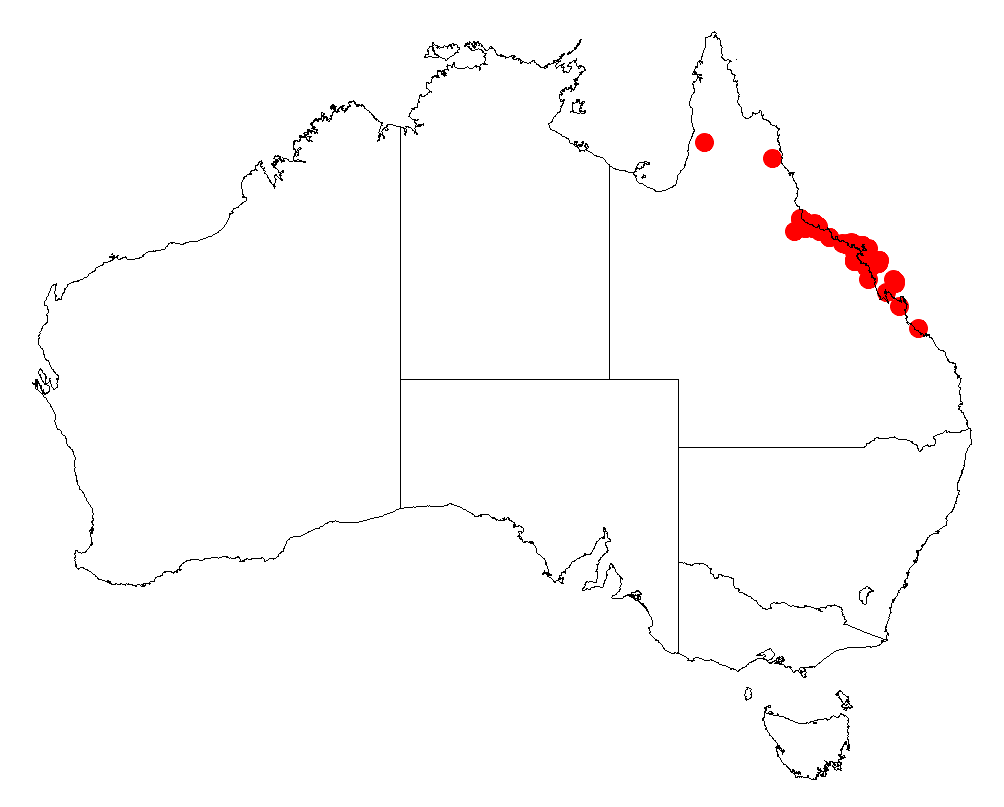
- Occurrence data from AVH

= Acacia spirorbis =

Species of legume

Acacia spirorbis is a tree belonging to the genus Acacia and the subgenus Juliflorae that is native to eastern Australia.

== Description ==
The tree typically grows to a maximum height of 12 m (39 ft) and has slender, glabrous branchlets. Like most species of Acacia it has phyllodes rather than true leaves. The glabrous and dark green coloured phyllodes have a narrowly elliptic shaped and recurved to a sickle shape. They are 9 to 17 cm (3.5 to 6.7 in) in length and have a width of 6 to 16 mm (0.24 to 0.63 in) with two main longitudinal veins that have greater prominence than the others. When it blooms it produces simple inflorescences that occur in pairs in the axils. The cylindrical flower-spikes have a length of 3 to 8 cm (1.2 to 3.1 in) with creamy coloured flowers that occur in interrupted bands. Following flowering flat and spirally coiled seed pods form that have a width of 3.5 to 5 mm (0.14 to 0.20 in) are glabrous and covered in a fine white powder. The seeds inside the pods are arranged longitudinally or slightly obliquely. The shiny dark brown seeds have an oblong shape with a bright yellow aril that is folded many times under the seed.

== Taxonomy ==
The species was first formally described by the botanist Jacques Labillardière in 1825 as part of the work Sertum austro-caledonicum. It was reclassified by Leslie Pedley in 1987 as Racosperma spirorbis and then transferred back to genus Acacia in 2006.

There are two subspecies:

- Acacia spirorbis subsp. spirorbis
- Acacia spirorbis subsp. solandri

== Distribution ==
It is endemic to the coastal parts of Queensland extending from Townsville in the north down to around MacKay in the south including numerous islands off the coast and a smaller isolated population on Rat Island further south near Rockhampton. The tree is usually situated along the margins of rainforest communities or as a part of Eucalyptus woodlands in drier areas. It is also native to Vanuatu and New Caledonia.

== See also ==
- List of Acacia species
