= Buprestomorpha =

Scientific classification
- Kingdom: Animalia
- Phylum: Arthropoda
- Class: Insecta
- Order: Coleoptera
- Suborder: Polyphaga
- Infraorder: Cucujiformia
- Family: Cerambycidae
- Genus: Buprestomorpha
- Species: B. montrouzieri

Binomial name
- Buprestomorpha montrouzieri Thomson, 1860

Genus of beetles

Buprestomorpha montrouzieri is a species of beetle in the family Cerambycidae, and the only species in the genus Buprestomorpha. It was described by Thomson in 1860.
