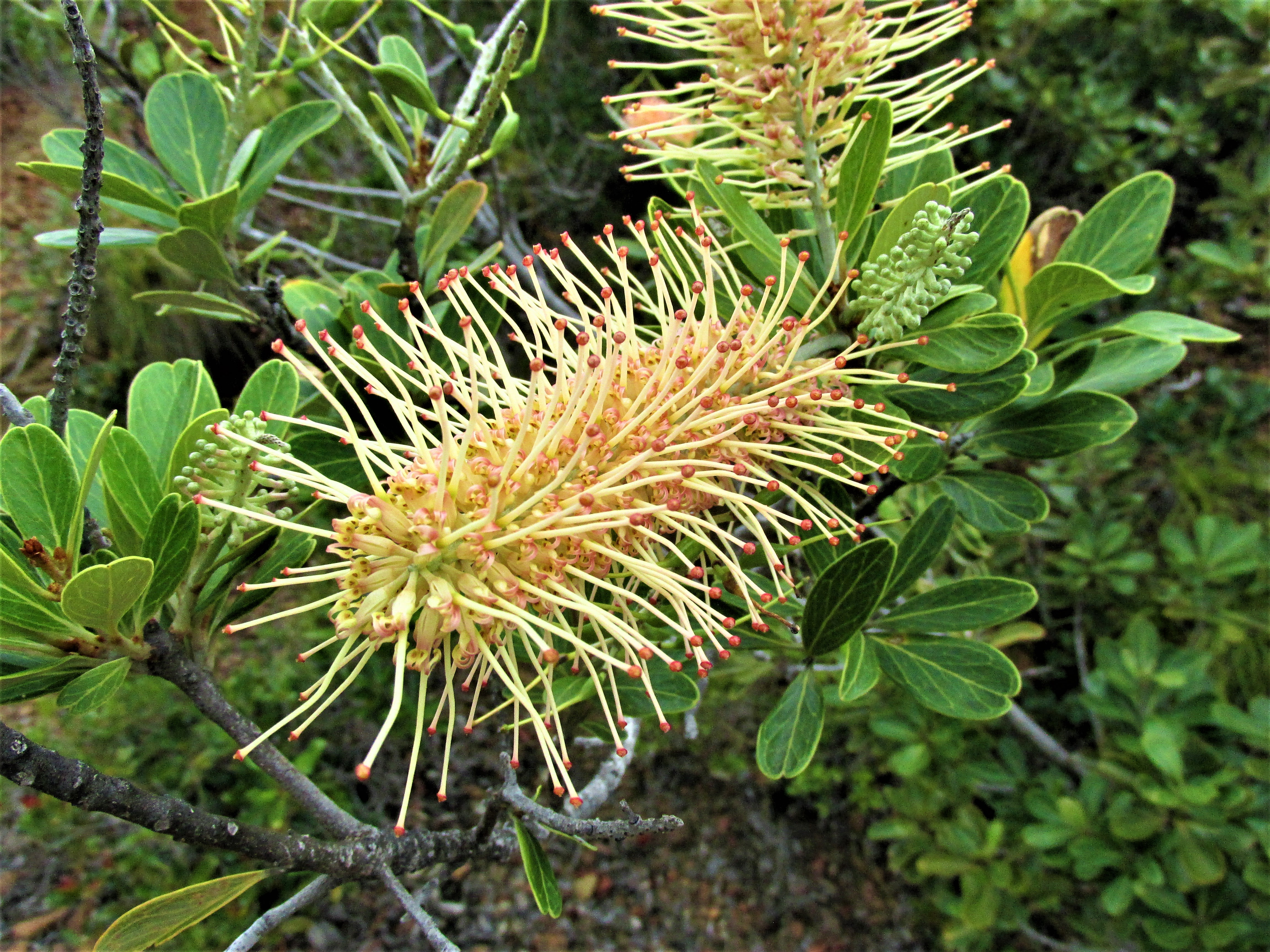

Conservation status
- Least Concern (IUCN 3.1)

Scientific classification
- Kingdom: Plantae
- Clade: Embryophytes
- Clade: Tracheophytes
- Clade: Angiosperms
- Clade: Eudicots
- Order: Proteales
- Family: Proteaceae
- Genus: Grevillea
- Species: G. gillivrayi

Binomial name
- Grevillea gillivrayi Hook.

Synonyms
- Hakea gillivrayi (Hook.) Christenh. & Byng

= Grevillea gillivrayi =

Species of shrub endemic to New Caledonia

Grevillea gillivrayi, commonly known as rince-bouteille commun in French, is a shrub or small tree in the family Proteaceae. It is endemic to New Caledonia.

The species grows up to 10 metres (33 ft) in height. It is a manganese accumulator.
