= List of birds of New Caledonia =

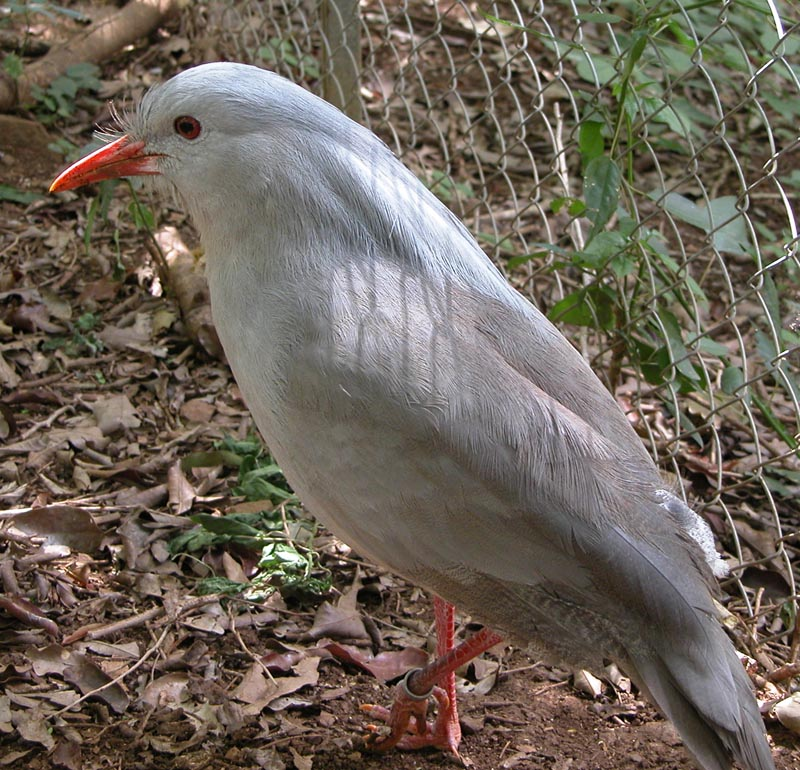
The kagu is the only extant representative of a family endemic to New Caledonia and is an emblem of the island territory.

This is a list of the bird species recorded in New Caledonia. The avifauna of New Caledonia include a total of 226 species, of which 28 are endemic, and 13 have been introduced by humans.

This list's taxonomic treatment (designation and sequence of orders, families and species) and nomenclature (common and scientific names) follow the conventions of The Clements Checklist of Birds of the World, 2022 edition. The family accounts at the beginning of each heading reflect this taxonomy, as do the species counts found in each family account. Introduced and accidental species are included in the total counts for New Caledonia.

The following tags have been used to highlight several categories.

- (A) Accidental – a species that rarely or accidentally occurs in New Caledonia
- (E) Endemic – a species endemic to New Caledonia
- (I) Introduced – a species introduced to New Caledonia as a consequence, direct or indirect, of human actions
- (N) Native – a species naturally found in New Caledonia that was not introduced by human actions
- (Ex) Extirpated – a species that no longer occurs in New Caledonia although populations exist elsewhere
- (Ext) Extinct – a species formerly endemic or native to New Caledonia, that is now extinct

== Ducks, geese, and waterfowl ==
Order: Anseriformes Family: Anatidae

Anatidae includes the ducks and most duck-like waterfowl, such as geese and swans. These birds are adapted to an aquatic existence with webbed feet, flattened bills, and feathers that are excellent at shedding water due to an oily coating.

- Wandering whistling-duck, Dendrocygna arcuata (A)
- Canada goose, Branta canadensis (A)
- Australian shoveler, Spatula rhynchotis (A)
- Muscovy duck, Cairina moschata (I)
- Pacific black duck, Anas superciliosa (N)
- Mallard, Anas platyrhynchos (I)
- Gray teal, Anas gracilis (A)
- Brown teal, Anas chlorotis (A)
- Hardhead, Aythya australis (N)

== Megapodes ==
Order: Galliformes Family: Megapodiidae

Megapodes or scrubfowl are grouse-like birds that live on the forest floor. They have stocky proportions and large feet ('Megapode' means 'large foot' in Latin). They usually lay their eggs in a mound of warm compost or in a geothermally active area to incubate them, from which the chicks hatch fully developed and independent. Three extinct species are known from New Caledonia-one also known from Tonga, and the other two, one from the Isle of Pines and the other from the Loyalty Islands, are both undescribed.

- Pile-builder megapode, Megapodius molistructor (Ext)
- Loyalty Islands megapode, Megapodius species (Ext)
- Île des Pins megapode, Megapodius species (Ext)

== Sylviornithids ==
Order: Pangalliformes Family: Sylviornithidae

The Sylviornithidae are an extinct group of stem-galliform birds that includes Sylviornis and Megavitiornis. They are sometimes erroneously called giant scrubfowl or giant megapodes.

- New Caledonian giant scrubfowl, Sylviornis neocaledoniae (Ext)

== Pheasants, grouse, and allies ==
Order: Galliformes Family: Phasianidae

The Phasianidae are a family of terrestrial birds. In general, they are plump (although they vary in size) and have broad, relatively short wings.

- Indian peafowl, Pavo cristatus (I)
- Red junglefowl, Gallus gallus (I)
- Ring-necked pheasant, Phasianus colchicus (I)
- Wild turkey, Meleagris gallopavo (I)

== Grebes ==
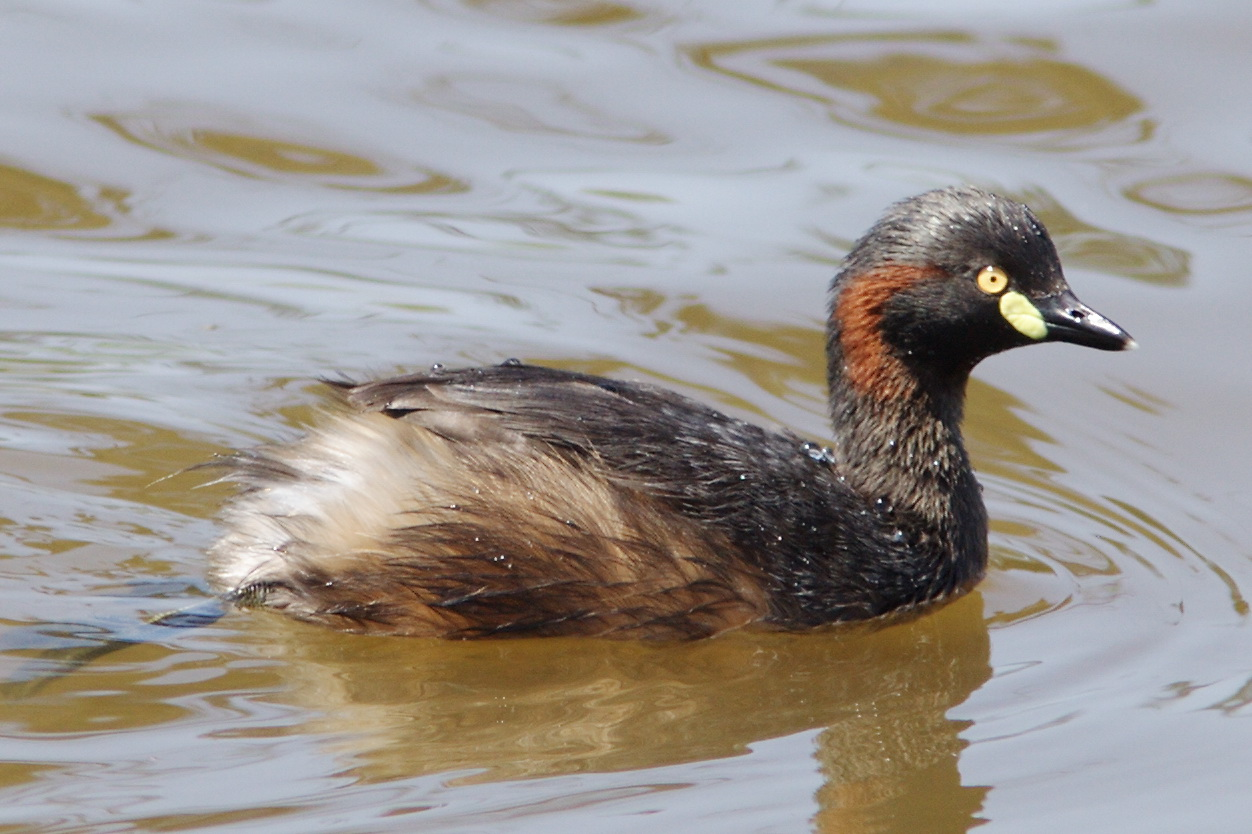
Australasian grebe

Order: Podicipediformes Family: Podicipedidae

Grebes are small to medium-large freshwater diving birds. They have lobed toes and are excellent swimmers and divers. However, they have their feet placed far back on the body, making them quite ungainly on land.

- Australasian grebe, Tachybaptus novaehollandiae (N)

== Pigeons and doves ==
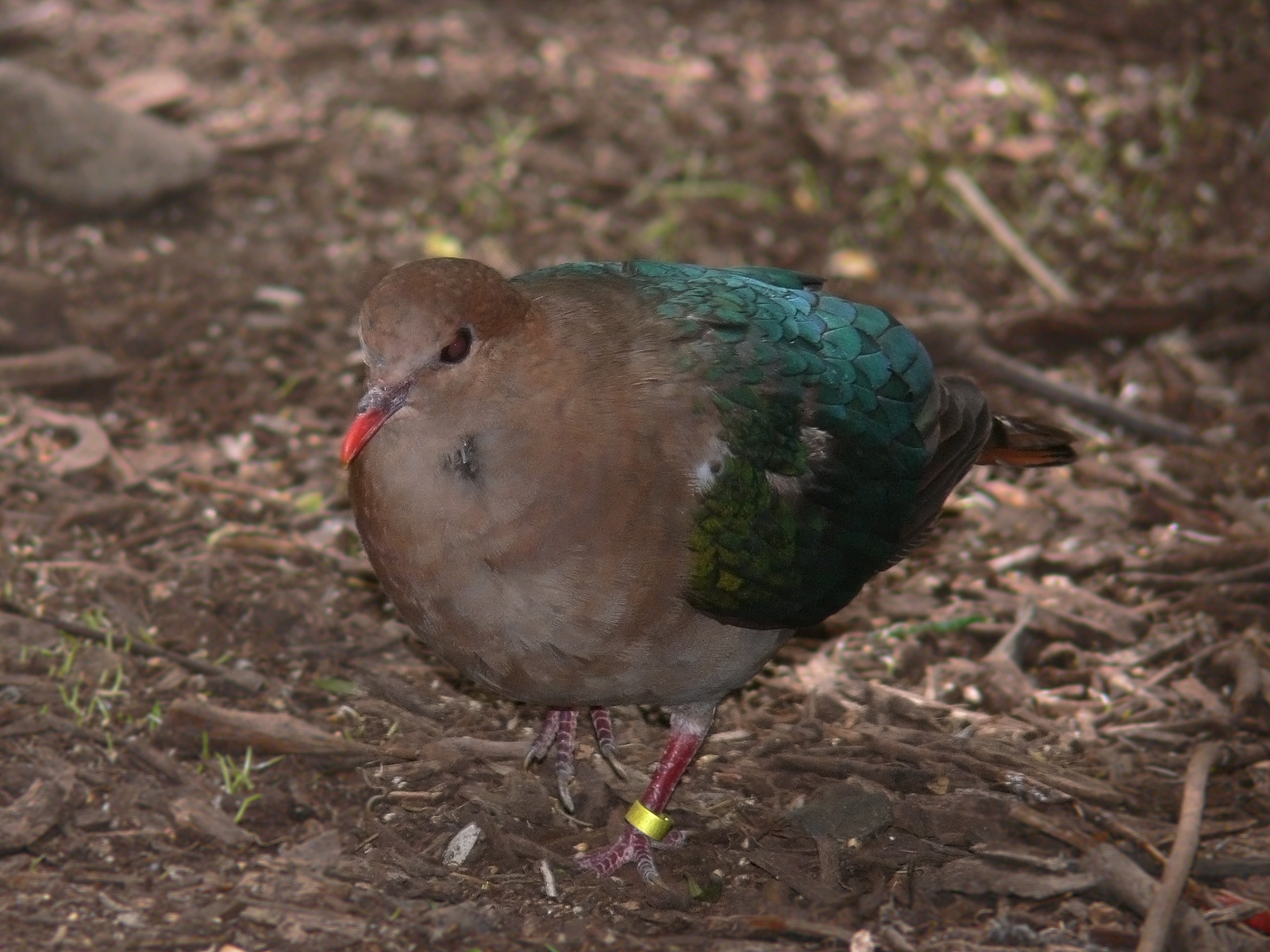
Pacific emerald dove

Order: Columbiformes Family: Columbidae

Pigeons and doves are stout-bodied birds with short necks and short slender bills with a fleshy cere.

- Rock pigeon, Columba livia (I)
- Metallic pigeon, Columba vitiensis
- Spotted dove, Streptopelia chinensis (I)
- Pacific emerald dove, Chalcophaps longirostris (N)
- Zebra dove, Geopelia striata (I)
- Red-bellied fruit-dove, Ptilinopus greyi (N)
- Cloven-feathered dove, Drepanoptila holosericea (E)
- Pacific imperial-pigeon, Ducula pacifica (N)
- New Caledonian imperial-pigeon, Ducula goliath (E)
- Kanaka pigeon, Caloenas canacorum (Ext)
- New Caledonian ground dove, Pampusana longitarsus (Ext)

== Cuckoos ==
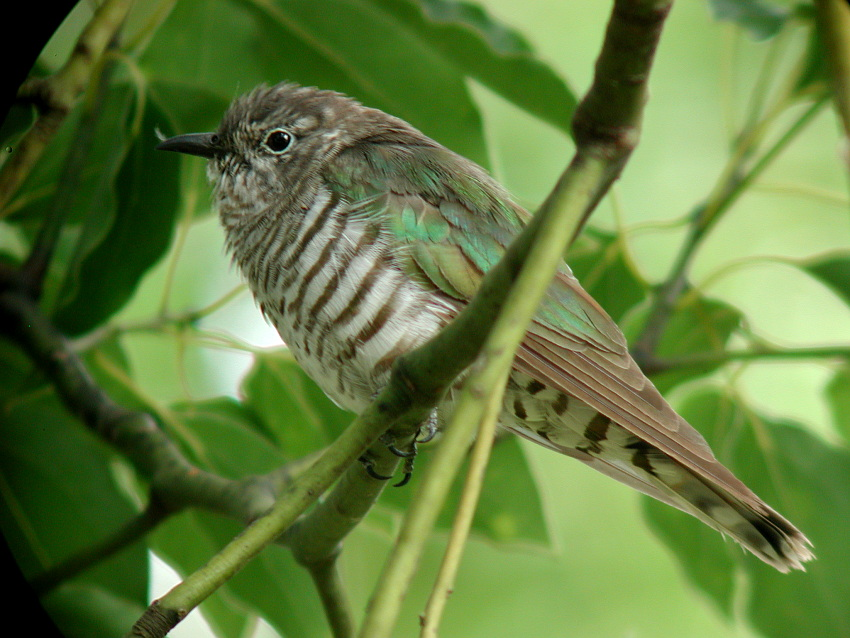
Shining bronze-cuckoo

Order: Cuculiformes Family: Cuculidae

The family Cuculidae includes cuckoos, roadrunners and anis. These birds are of variable size with slender bodies, long tails and strong legs. The Old World cuckoos are brood parasites.

- Long-tailed koel, Urodynamis taitensis (N)
- Channel-billed cuckoo, Scythrops novaehollandiae (A)
- Shining bronze-cuckoo, Chrysococcyx lucidus (N)
- Fan-tailed cuckoo, Cacomantis flabelliformis (N)

== Nightjars and allies ==
Order: Caprimulgiformes Family: Caprimulgidae

Nightjars are medium-sized nocturnal birds that usually nest on the ground. They have long wings, short legs and very short bills. Most have small feet, of little use for walking, and long pointed wings. Their soft plumage is camouflaged to resemble bark or leaves.

- New Caledonian nightjar, Eurostopodus exul (E)-possibly extinct
- White-throated nightjar, Eurostopodus mystacalis (N)

== Owlet-nightjars ==
Order: Caprimulgiformes Family: Aegothelidae

The owlet-nightjars are small nocturnal birds related to the nightjars and frogmouths. They are insectivores which hunt mostly in the air. Their soft plumage is a mixture of browns and paler shades.

- New Caledonian owlet-nightjar, Aegotheles savesi (E)-possibly extinct

== Swifts ==
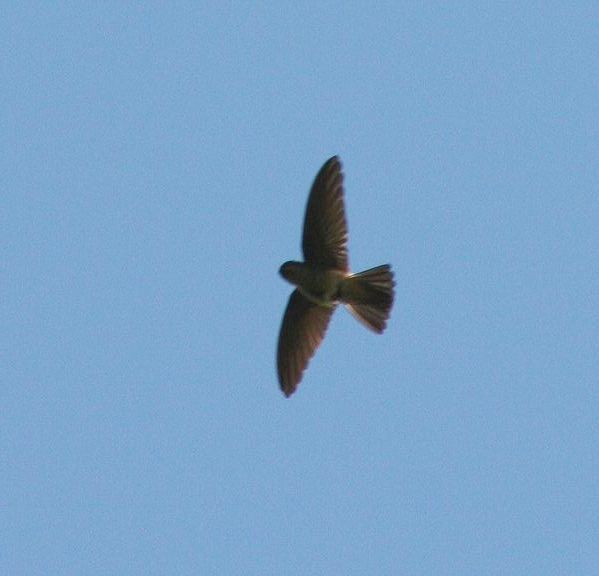
White-rumped swiftlet

Order: Caprimulgiformes Family: Apodidae

Swifts are small birds which spend the majority of their lives flying. These birds have very short legs and never settle voluntarily on the ground, perching instead only on vertical surfaces. Many swifts have long swept-back wings which resemble a crescent or boomerang.

- White-throated needletail, Hirundapus caudacutus (A)
- Glossy swiftlet, Collocalia esculenta (N)
- Satin swiftlet, Collocalia uropygialis (N)
- White-rumped swiftlet, Aerodramus spodiopygius (N)
- Australian swiftlet, Aerodramus terraereginae (N)
- Uniform swiftlet, Aerodramus vanikorensis (A)

== Rails, gallinules, and coots ==
Order: Gruiformes Family: Rallidae

Rallidae is a large family of small to medium-sized birds which includes the rails, crakes, coots and gallinules. Typically they inhabit dense vegetation in damp environments near lakes, swamps or rivers. In general they are shy and secretive birds, making them difficult to observe. Most species have strong legs and long toes which are well adapted to soft uneven surfaces. They tend to have short, rounded wings and to be weak fliers.

- New Caledonian rail, Gallirallus lafresnayanus (E)-possibly extinct
- Buff-banded rail, Gallirallus philippensis (N)
- Dusky moorhen, Gallinula tenebrosa (N)
- New Caledonian gallinule, Porphyrio kukwiedei (Ext)
- Australasian swamphen, Porphyrio melanotus (N)
- White-browed crake, Poliolimnas cinereus (A)
- Baillon's crake, Zapornia pusilla (A)
- Spotless crake, Zapornia tabuensis (N)

== Thick-knees ==
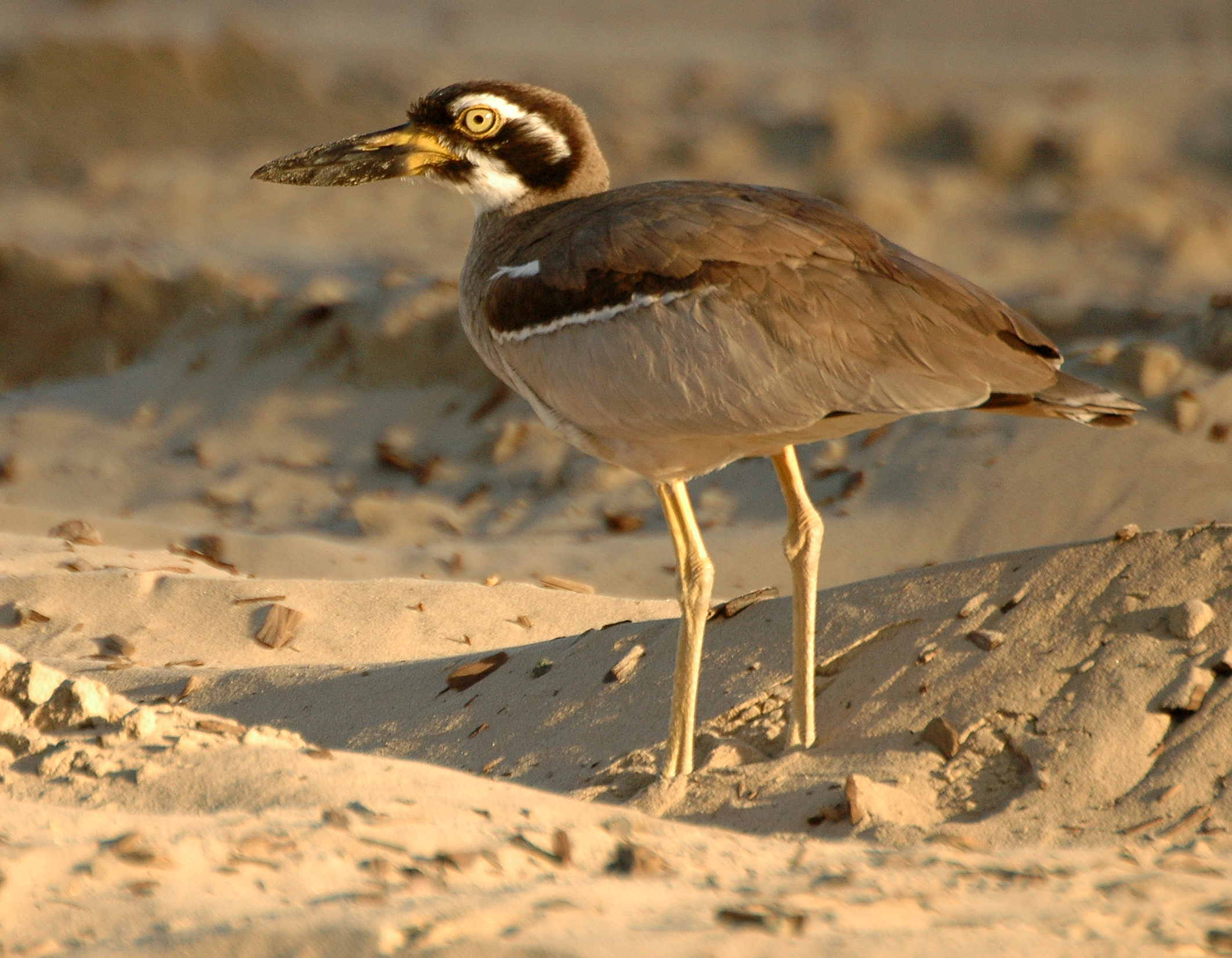
Beach thick-knee

Order: Charadriiformes Family: Burhinidae

The thick-knees are a group of largely tropical waders in the family Burhinidae. They are found worldwide within the tropical zone, with some species also breeding in temperate Europe and Australia. They are medium to large waders with strong black or yellow-black bills, large yellow eyes and cryptic plumage. Despite being classed as waders, most species have a preference for arid or semi-arid habitats.

- Beach thick-knee, Esacus magnirostris (N)

== Oystercatchers ==
Order: Charadriiformes Family: Haematopodidae

The oystercatchers are large and noisy plover-like birds, with strong bills used for smashing or prising open molluscs.

- South Island oystercatcher, Haematopus finschi (A)

== Plovers and lapwings ==
Order: Charadriiformes Family: Charadriidae

The family Charadriidae includes the plovers, dotterels and lapwings. They are small to medium-sized birds with compact bodies, short, thick necks and long, usually pointed, wings. They are found in open country worldwide, mostly in habitats near water.

- Black-bellied plover, Pluvialis squatarola (N)
- Pacific golden-plover, Pluvialis fulva (N)
- Masked lapwing, Vanellus miles (N)
- Siberian sand plover, Anarhynchus mongolus (A)
- Lesser sand-plover, Charadrius mongolus (N)
- Greater sand-plover, Charadrius leschenaultii (A)
- Double-banded plover, Charadrius bicinctus (A)
- Semipalmated plover, Charadrius semipalmatus (A)
- Oriental plover, Charadrius veredus (A)
- Hooded plover, Thinornis cucullatus (N)

== Sandpipers and allies ==
Order: Charadriiformes Family: Scolopacidae

Scolopacidae is a large diverse family of small to medium-sized shorebirds including the sandpipers, curlews, godwits, shanks, tattlers, woodcocks, snipes, dowitchers and phalaropes. The majority of these species eat small invertebrates picked out of the mud or soil. Variation in length of legs and bills enables multiple species to feed in the same habitat, particularly on the coast, without direct competition for food.

- Whimbrel, Numenius phaeopus (N)
- Little curlew, Numenius minutus (A)
- Far Eastern curlew, Numenius madagascariensis (A)
- Bar-tailed godwit, Limosa lapponica (N)
- Black-tailed godwit, Limosa limosa (A)
- Ruddy turnstone, Arenaria interpres (N)
- Great knot, Calidris tenuirostris (A)
- Red knot, Calidris canutus (A)
- Sharp-tailed sandpiper, Calidris acuminata (N)
- Curlew sandpiper, Calidris ferruginea (A)
- Red-necked stint, Calidris ruficollis (N)
- Sanderling, Calidris alba (N)
- Latham's snipe, Gallinago hardwickii (A)
- New Caledonian snipe, Coenocorypha neocaledonica (Ext)
- Terek sandpiper, Xenus cinereus (N)
- Common sandpiper, Actitis hypoleucos (N)
- Gray-tailed tattler, Tringa brevipes (N)
- Wandering tattler, Tringa incana (N)
- Common greenshank, Tringa nebularia (N)
- Marsh sandpiper, Tringa stagnatilis (A)

== Buttonquail ==
Order: Charadriiformes Family: Turnicidae

The buttonquail are small, drab, running birds which resemble the true quails. The female is the brighter of the sexes and initiates courtship. The male incubates the eggs and tends the young.

- New Caledonian buttonquail, Turnix novaecaledoniae (E)-possibly extinct

== Pratincoles and coursers ==
Order: Charadriiformes Family: Glareolidae

Glareolidae is a family of wading birds comprising the pratincoles, which have short legs, long pointed wings and long forked tails, and the coursers, which have long legs, short wings and long, pointed bills which curve downwards.

- Australian pratincole, Stiltia isabella (A)

== Skuas and jaegers ==
Order: Charadriiformes Family: Stercorariidae

The family Stercorariidae are, in general, medium to large birds, typically with grey or brown plumage, often with white markings on the wings. They nest on the ground in temperate and arctic regions and are long-distance migrants.

- South polar skua, Stercorarius maccormicki (A)
- Brown skua, Stercorarius antarcticus (N)
- Pomarine jaeger, Stercorarius pomarinus (A)
- Parasitic jaeger, Stercorarius parasiticus (A)
- Long-tailed jaeger, Stercorarius longicaudus (N)

== Gulls, terns, and skimmers ==
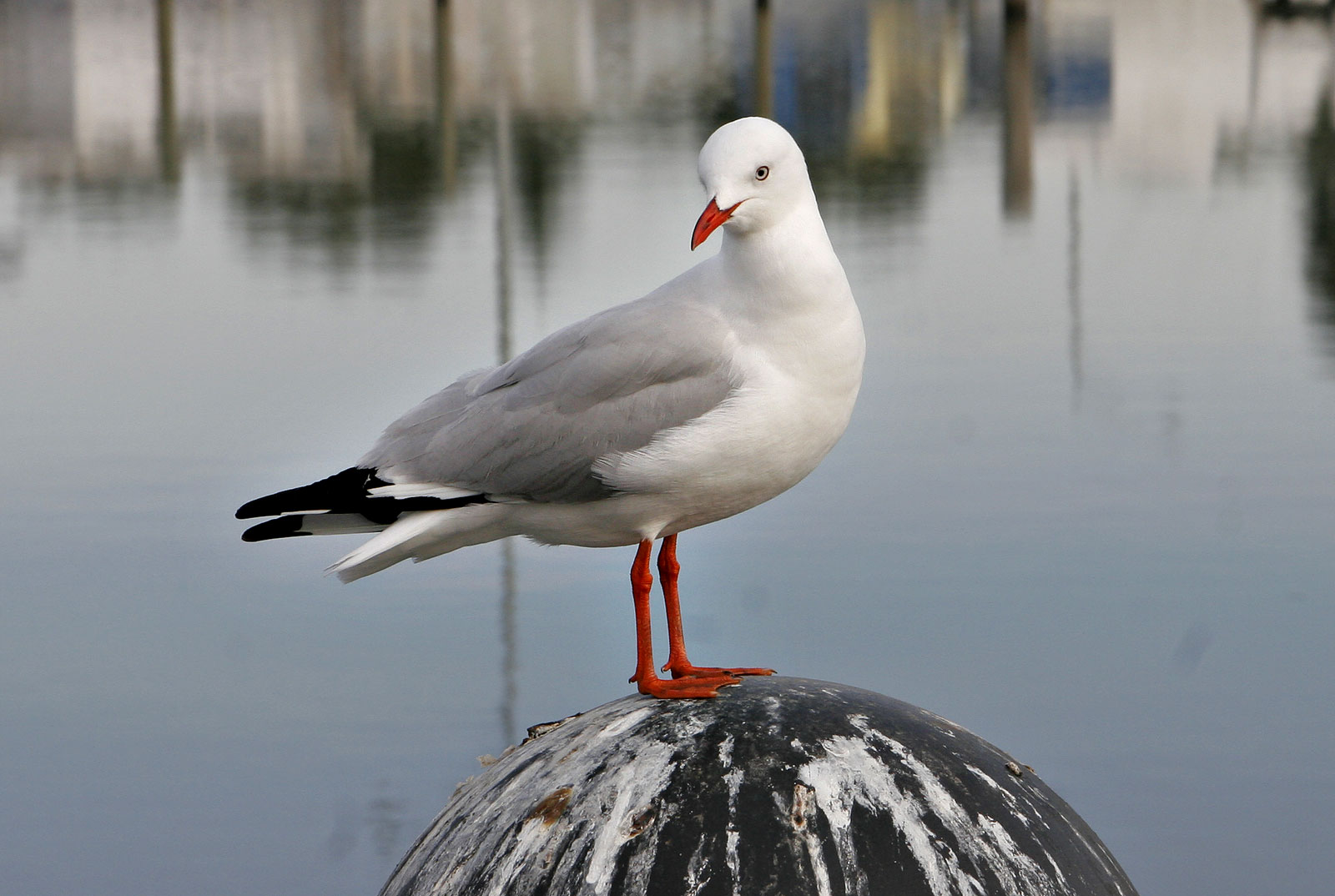
The silver gull is one of the few species of gull found on tropical islands

Order: Charadriiformes Family: Laridae

Laridae is a family of medium to large seabirds, the gulls, terns, and skimmers. Gulls are typically grey or white, often with black markings on the head or wings. They have stout, longish bills and webbed feet. Terns are a group of generally medium to large seabirds typically with grey or white plumage, often with black markings on the head. Most terns hunt fish by diving but some pick insects off the surface of fresh water. Terns are generally long-lived birds, with several species known to live in excess of 30 years.

- Silver gull, Chroicocephalus novaehollandiae (N)
- Brown noddy, Anous stolidus (N)
- Black noddy, Anous minutus (N)
- Blue noddy, Anous ceruleus (A)
- Gray noddy, Anous albivitta (N)
- White tern, Gygis alba (N)
- Sooty tern, Onychoprion fuscatus (N)
- Bridled tern, Onychoprion anaethetus (N)
- Little tern, Sternula albifrons (N)
- Australian fairy tern, Sternula nereis (N)
- White-winged tern, Chlidonias leucopterus (A)
- Whiskered tern, Chlidonias hybrida (N)
- Roseate tern, Sterna dougallii (N)
- Black-naped tern, Sterna sumatrana (N)
- Great crested tern, Thalasseus bergii (N)
- Lesser crested tern, Thalasseus bengalensis (A)

== Kagus ==
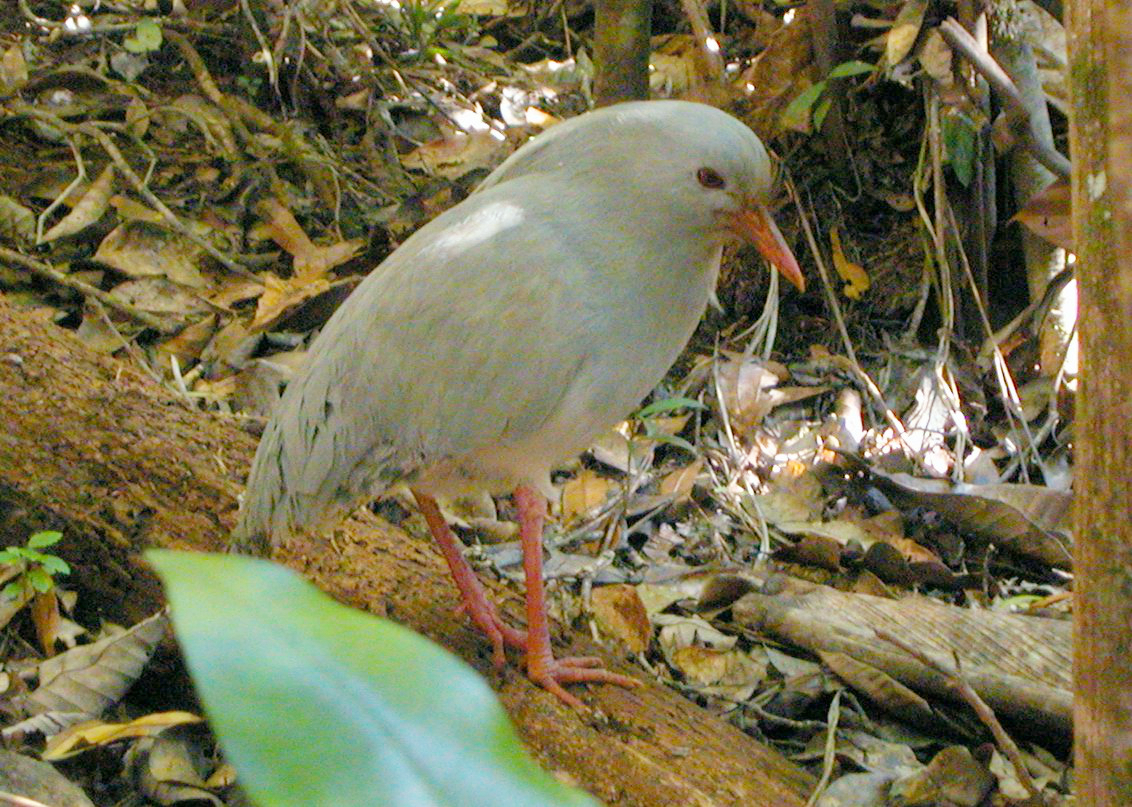
Wild kagu at Rivière Bleue National Park, a refuge managed for the species

Order: Eurypygiformes Family: Rhynochetidae

The kagu or cagou is a long-legged grey bird found only in the dense mountain forests of New Caledonia. It is almost flightless. It builds a ground nest of sticks and lays a single egg. It is vulnerable to rats and cats which are introduced species on the island, hence it is now threatened with extinction. The remote habitat and rarity of this species mean that little is known of its habits. It formerly had a relative, the lowland kagu, which was about 15% larger. This died out after the first human contact with the island.

- Kagu, Rhynochetos jubatus (E)
- Lowland kagu, Rhynochetos orarius (Ext)

== Tropicbirds ==
Order: Phaethontiformes Family: Phaethontidae

Tropicbirds are slender white birds of tropical oceans, with exceptionally long central tail feathers. Their heads and long wings have black markings.

- White-tailed tropicbird, Phaethon lepturus (N)
- Red-tailed tropicbird, Phaethon rubricauda (N)

== Albatrosses ==
Order: Procellariiformes Family: Diomedeidae

The albatrosses are among the largest of flying birds, and the great albatrosses from the genus Diomedea have the largest wingspans of any extant birds.

- Buller's albatross, Thalassarche bulleri (A)
- Black-browed albatross, Thalassarche melanophris (A)
- Light-mantled albatross, Phoebetria palpebrata (A)
- Royal albatross, Diomedea epomophora (A)
- Wandering albatross, Diomedea exulans (A)

== Southern storm-petrels ==
Order: Procellariiformes Family: Oceanitidae

The southern storm-petrels are relatives of the petrels and are the smallest seabirds. They feed on planktonic crustaceans and small fish picked from the surface, typically while hovering. The flight is fluttering and sometimes bat-like.

- Wilson's storm-petrel, Oceanites oceanicus (A)
- White-faced storm-petrel, Pelagodroma marina (A)
- White-bellied storm-petrel, Fregetta grallaria (A)
- Black-bellied storm-petrel, Fregetta tropica (A)
- New Caledonian storm-petrel, Fregetta lineata (E)
- Polynesian storm-petrel, Nesofregetta fuliginosa (N)

== Northern storm-petrels ==
Order: Procellariiformes Family: Hydrobatidae

The northern storm-petrels are relatives of the petrels and are the smallest seabirds. They feed on planktonic crustaceans and small fish picked from the surface, typically while hovering. The flight is fluttering and sometimes bat-like.

- Band-rumped storm-petrel, Hydrobates castro (A)

== Shearwaters and petrels ==
Order: Procellariiformes Family: Procellariidae

The procellariids are the main group of medium-sized "true petrels", characterised by united nostrils with medium septum and a long outer functional primary.

- Southern giant-petrel, Macronectes giganteus (A)
- Northern giant-petrel, Macronectes halli (A)
- Cape petrel, Daption capense (A)
- Kermadec petrel, Pterodroma neglecta (A)
- Herald petrel, Pterodroma heraldica (N)
- Providence petrel, Pterodroma solandri (A)
- Mottled petrel, Pterodroma inexpectata (N)
- White-necked petrel, Pterodroma cervicalis (A)
- Bonin petrel, Pterodroma hypoleuca (N)
- Black-winged petrel, Pterodroma nigripennis (N)
- Cook's petrel, Pterodroma cookii (A)
- Gould's petrel, Pterodroma leucoptera (N)
- Collared petrel, Pterodroma brevipes (N)
- Fairy prion, Pachyptila turtur (A)
- Antarctic prion, Pachyptila desolata (A)
- Bulwer's petrel, Bulweria bulwerii (A)
- Tahiti petrel, Pseudobulweria rostrata (N)
- Gray petrel, Procellaria cinerea (A)
- Parkinson's petrel, Procellaria parkinsoni (A)
- Streaked shearwater, Calonectris leucomelas (A)
- Flesh-footed shearwater, Ardenna carneipes (A)
- Wedge-tailed shearwater, Ardenna pacificus (N)
- Buller's shearwater, Ardenna bulleri (A)
- Sooty shearwater, Ardenna griseus (N)
- Short-tailed shearwater, Ardenna tenuirostris (N)
- Fluttering shearwater, Puffinus gavia (N)
- Little shearwater, Puffinus assimilis (N)
- Tropical shearwater, Puffinus bailloni (N)

== Frigatebirds ==
Order: Suliformes Family: Fregatidae

Frigatebirds are large seabirds usually found over tropical oceans. They are large, black-and-white or completely black, with long wings and deeply forked tails. The males have coloured inflatable throat pouches. They do not swim or walk and cannot take off from a flat surface. Having the largest wingspan-to-body-weight ratio of any bird, they are essentially aerial, able to stay aloft for more than a week.

- Lesser frigatebird, Fregata ariel (N)
- Great frigatebird, Fregata minor (N)

== Boobies and gannets ==
Order: Suliformes Family: Sulidae

The sulids comprise the gannets and boobies. Both groups are medium to large coastal seabirds that plunge-dive for fish.

- Masked booby, Sula dactylatra (N)
- Brown booby, Sula leucogaster (N)
- Red-footed booby, Sula sula (N)
- Australasian gannet, Morus serrator (N)

== Cormorants and shags ==
Order: Suliformes Family: Phalacrocoracidae

Phalacrocoracidae is a family of medium to large coastal, fish-eating seabirds that includes cormorants and shags. Plumage colouration varies, with the majority having mainly dark plumage, some species being black-and-white and a few being colourful.

- Little pied cormorant, Microcarbo melanoleucos (N)
- Great cormorant, Phalacrocorax carbo (N)
- Little black cormorant, Phalacrocorax sulcirostris (N)

== Pelicans ==
Order: Pelecaniformes Family: Pelecanidae

Pelicans are large water birds with a distinctive pouch under their beak. As with other members of the order Pelecaniformes, they have webbed feet with four toes.

- Australian pelican, Pelecanus conspicillatus (A)

== Herons, egrets, and bitterns ==
Order: Pelecaniformes Family: Ardeidae

The family Ardeidae contains the bitterns, herons and egrets. Herons and egrets are medium to large wading birds with long necks and legs. Bitterns tend to be shorter necked and more wary. Members of Ardeidae fly with their necks retracted, unlike other long-necked birds such as storks, ibises and spoonbills.

- Australasian bittern, Botaurus poiciloptilus (Ex)
- Black-backed bittern, Ixobrychus dubius (N)
- Great egret, Ardea alba (A)
- Intermediate egret, Ardea intermedia (N)
- Eastern cattle egret, Ardea coromanda (N)
- White-faced heron, Egretta novaehollandiae (N)
- Little egret, Egretta garzetta (N)
- Pacific reef-heron, Egretta sacra (N)
- Pied heron, Egretta picata (A)
- Cattle egret, Bubulcus ibis (A)
- Striated heron, Butorides striata (A)
- Nankeen night-heron, Nycticorax caledonicus (N)

== Ibises and spoonbills ==
Order: Pelecaniformes Family: Threskiornithidae

Threskiornithidae is a family of large terrestrial and wading birds which includes the ibises and spoonbills. They have long, broad wings with 11 primary and about 20 secondary feathers. They are strong fliers and despite their size and weight, very capable soarers.

- Glossy ibis, Plegadis falcinellus (N)
- Royal spoonbill, Platalea regia (A)

== Osprey ==
Order: Accipitriformes Family: Pandionidae

The family Pandionidae contains only one species, the osprey. The osprey is a medium-large raptor which is a specialist fish-eater with a worldwide distribution.

- Osprey, Pandion haliaetus (N)

== Hawks, eagles, and kites ==
Order: Accipitriformes Family: Accipitridae

Accipitridae is a family of birds of prey, which includes hawks, eagles, kites, harriers and Old World vultures. These birds have powerful hooked beaks for tearing flesh from their prey, strong legs, powerful talons and keen eyesight.

- Swamp harrier, Circus approximans (N)
- Brown goshawk, Accipiter fasciatus (N)
- New Caledonia goshawk, Accipiter haplochrous (E)
- Powerful goshawk, Accipiter efficax (Ext)
- Gracile goshawk, Accipiter quartus (Ext)
- Black kite, Milvus migrans (N)
- Whistling kite, Haliastur sphenurus (N)
- White-bellied sea-eagle, Haliaeetus leucogaster (A)

== Barn-owls ==
Order: Strigiformes Family: Tytonidae

Barn-owls are medium to large owls with large heads and characteristic heart-shaped faces. They have long strong legs with powerful talons.

- Australasian grass-owl, Tyto longimembris (N)
- Eastern barn owl, Tyto javanica (N)
- New Caledonian barn owl, Tyto letocarti (Ext)

== Owls ==
Order: Strigiformes Family: Strigidae

The typical owls are small to large solitary nocturnal birds of prey. They have large forward-facing eyes and ears, a hawk-like beak and a conspicuous circle of feathers around each eye called a facial disk.

- New Caledonian boobook, Ninox cf. novaeseelandiae (Ext)

== Hornbills ==
Order: Bucerotiformes Family: Bucerotidae

An extinct hornbill from the genus Rhyticeros has been found on Lifou Island in the Loyalty Islands. The fossil is about 30,000 years old. The species has not been described yet and it is unclear whether it was found only on the Loyalty Islands or on them and New Caledonia proper.

- Lifou hornbill, Rhyticeros species (Ext)

== Kingfishers ==
Order: Coraciiformes Family: Alcedinidae

Kingfishers are medium-sized birds with large heads, long, pointed bills, short legs and stubby tails.

- Sacred kingfisher, Todirhamphus sanctus (N)

== Bee-eaters ==
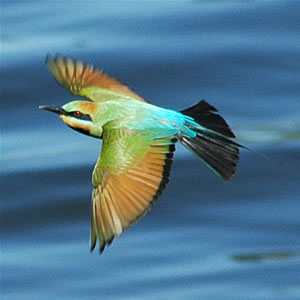
Rainbow bee-eater

Order: Coraciiformes Family: Meropidae

The bee-eaters are a group of near passerine birds in the family Meropidae. Most species are found in Africa but others occur in southern Europe, Madagascar, Australia and New Guinea. They are characterised by richly coloured plumage, slender bodies and usually elongated central tail feathers. All are colourful and have long downturned bills and pointed wings, which give them a swallow-like appearance when seen from afar.

- Rainbow bee-eater, Merops ornatus (N)

== Rollers ==
Order: Coraciiformes Family: Coraciidae

Rollers resemble crows in size and build, but are more closely related to the kingfishers and bee-eaters. They share the colourful appearance of those groups with blues and browns predominating. The two inner front toes are connected, but the outer toe is not.

- Dollarbird, Eurystomus orientalis (A)

== Falcons and caracaras ==
Order: Falconiformes Family: Falconidae

Falconidae is a family of diurnal birds of prey. They differ from hawks, eagles and kites in that they kill with their beaks instead of their talons.

- Nankeen kestrel, Falco cenchroides (A)
- Peregrine falcon, Falco peregrinus (N)

== Cockatoos ==
Order: Psittaciformes Family: Cacatuidae

Cockatoos are large parrots that are usually white and often have colorful crests. They are distributed over Australia, Papua New Guinea and parts of Indonesia, the Solomon Islands and the Philippines. A fossil of a cockatoo has recently been discovered in New Caledonia, but is yet to be described.

- New Caledonian cockatoo, Cacatua sp. (Ext)

== Old World parrots ==
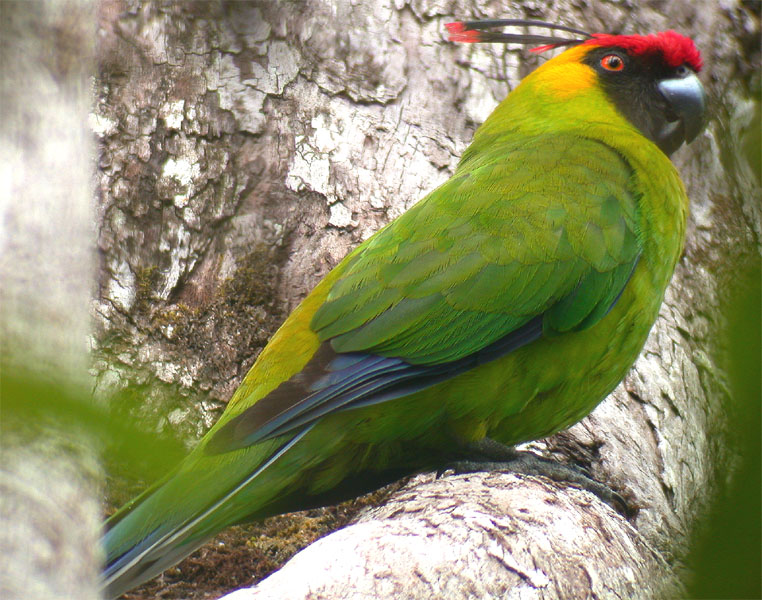
Horned parakeet

Order: Psittaciformes Family: Psittaculidae

Characteristic features of parrots include a strong curved bill, an upright stance, strong legs, and clawed zygodactyl feet. Many parrots are vividly colored, and some are multi-colored. In size they range from 8 cm (3 in) to 1 m (3 ft 3 in) in length. Old World parrots are found from Africa east across south and southeast Asia and Oceania to Australia and New Zealand.

- Horned parakeet, Eunymphicus cornutus (E)
- Ouvea parakeet, Eunymphicus uvaeensis (E)
- New Caledonian parakeet, Cyanoramphus saissetti (E)
- New Caledonian lorikeet, Vini diadema (E)-probably extinct
- Coconut lorikeet, Trichoglossus haematodus (N)
- Rainbow lorikeet, Trichoglossus moluccanus (N)
- Rose-ringed parakeet, Psittacula krameri (I)

== Honeyeaters ==
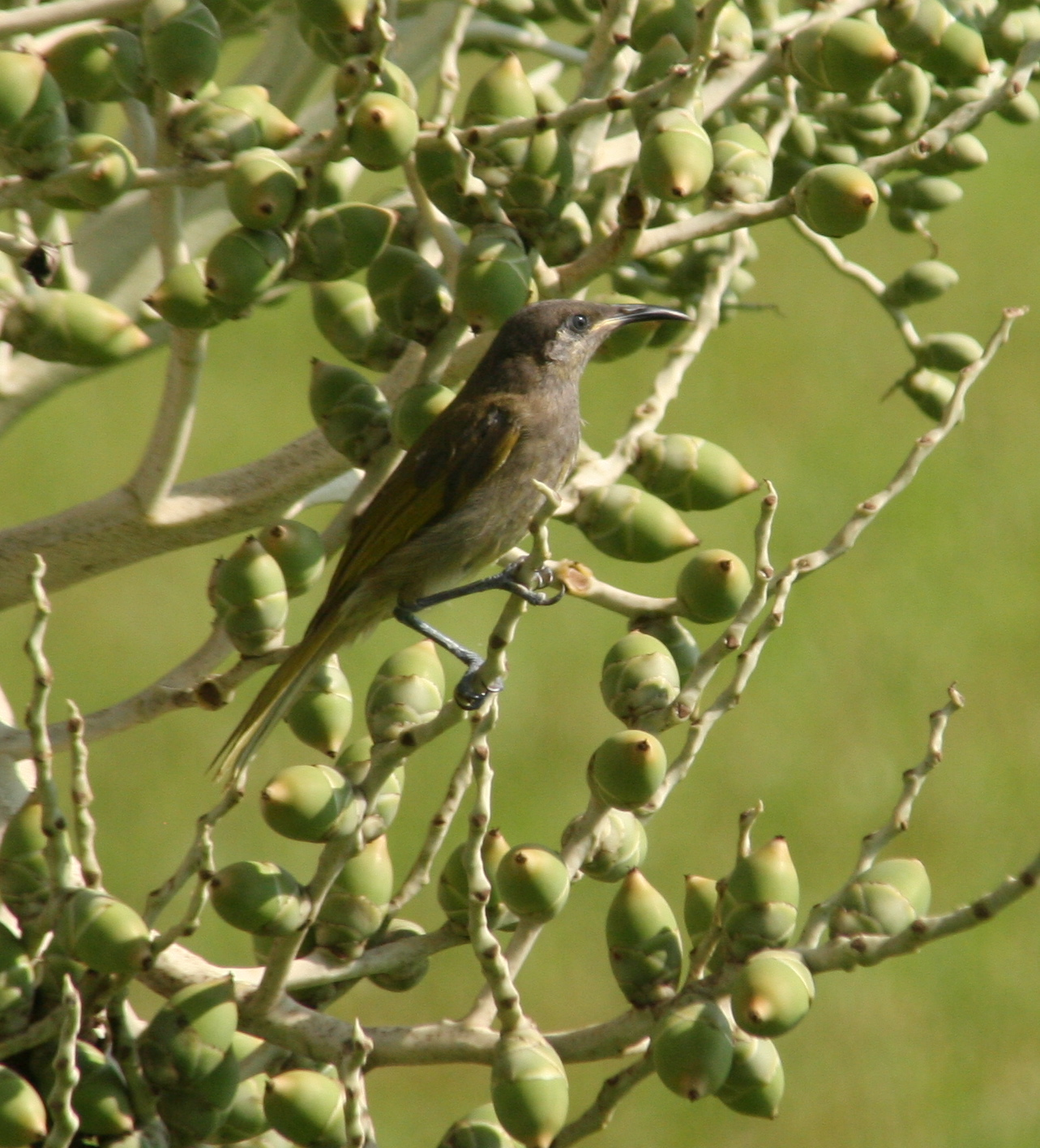
Dark-brown honeyeater

Order: Passeriformes Family: Meliphagidae

The honeyeaters are a large and diverse family of small to medium-sized birds most common in Australia and New Guinea. They are nectar feeders and closely resemble other nectar-feeding passerines.

- New Caledonian myzomela, Myzomela caledonica (E)
- Cardinal myzomela, Myzomela cardinalis (N)
- Barred honeyeater, Gliciphila undulata (E)
- Dark-brown honeyeater, Lichmera incana (N)
- Crow honeyeater, Gymnomyza aubryana (E)
- New Caledonian friarbird, Philemon diemenensis (E)

== Thornbills and allies ==
Order: Passeriformes Family: Acanthizidae

Thornbills are small passerine birds, similar in habits to the tits.

- Fan-tailed gerygone, Gerygone flavolateralis (N)

== Cuckooshrikes ==
Order: Passeriformes Family: Campephagidae

The cuckooshrikes are small to medium-sized passerine birds. They are predominantly greyish with white and black, although some species are brightly coloured.

- Black-faced cuckooshrike, Coracina novaehollandiae (A)
- South Melanesian cuckooshrike, Coracina caledonica (N)
- Polynesian triller, Lalage maculosa (A)
- Long-tailed triller, Lalage leucopyga (N)
- New Caledonian cuckooshrike, Analisoma analis (E)

== Whistlers and allies ==
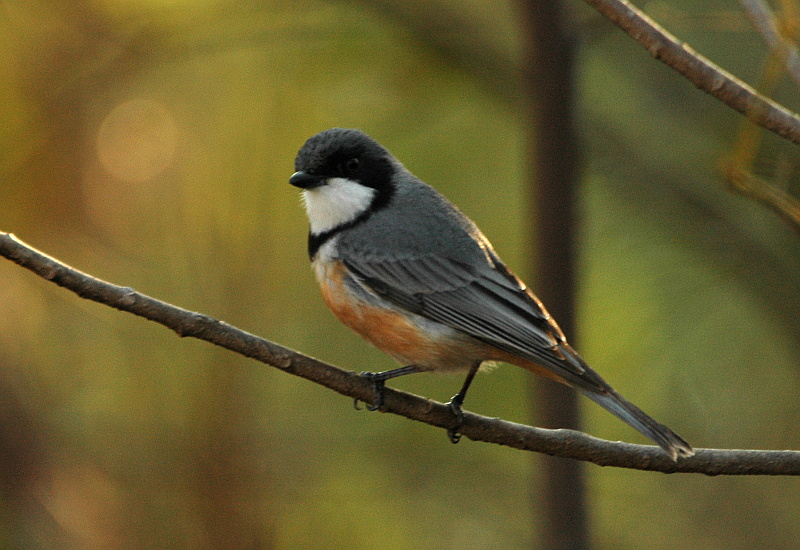
Rufous whistler

Order: Passeriformes Family: Pachycephalidae

The family Pachycephalidae includes the whistlers, shrikethrushes, and some of the pitohuis.

- Vanuatu whistler, Pachycephala chlorura (N)
- New Caledonian whistler, Pachycephala caledonica (E)
- Golden whistler, Pachycephala pectoralis (N)
- Rufous whistler, Pachycephala rufiventris (N)

== Woodswallows, bellmagpies, and allies ==
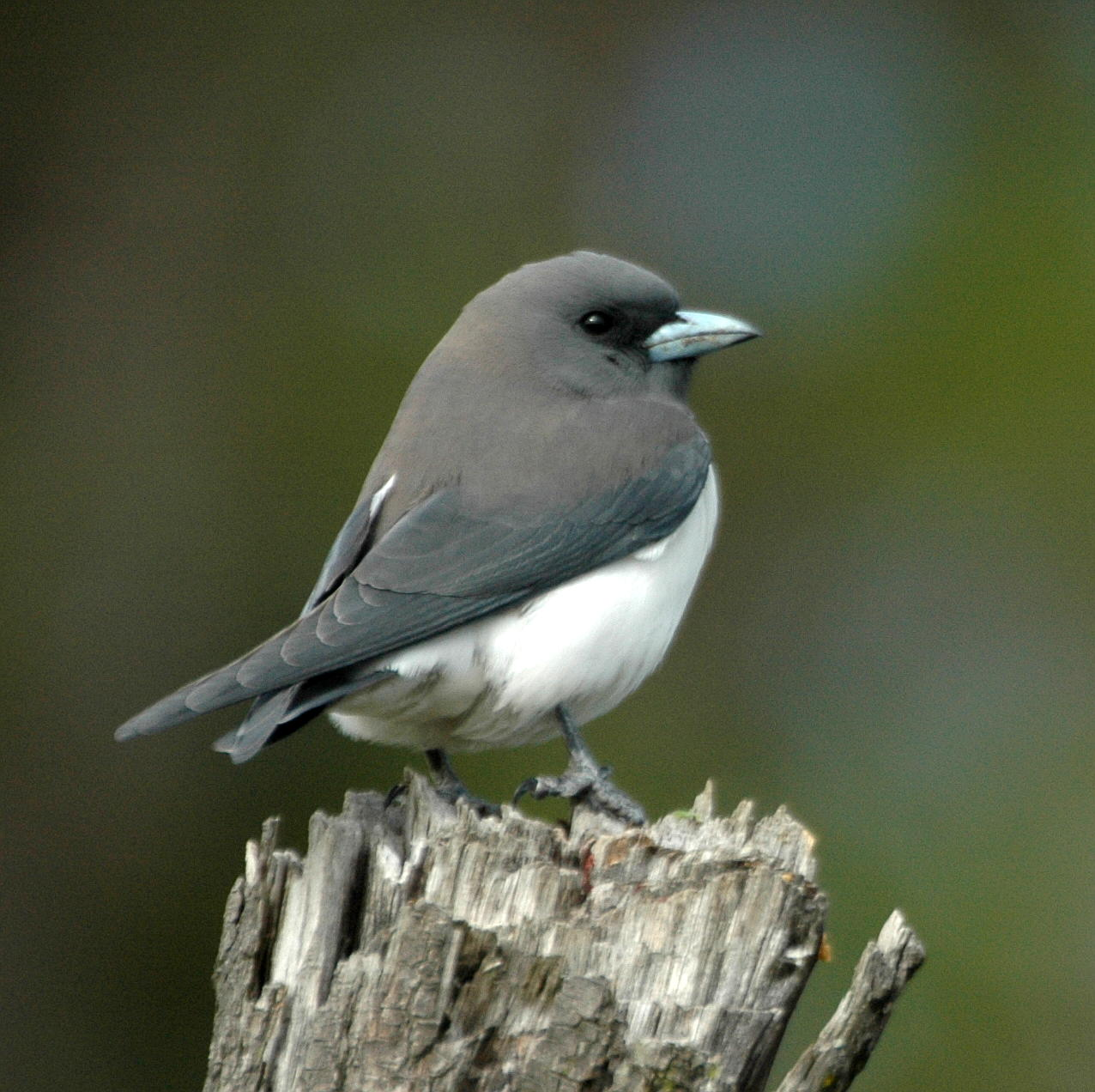
White-breasted woodswallow

Order: Passeriformes Family: Artamidae

The woodswallows are soft-plumaged, somber-coloured passerine birds. They are smooth, agile flyers with moderately large, semi-triangular wings.

- White-breasted woodswallow, Artamus leucorynchus (N)
- Dusky woodswallow, Artamus cyanopterus (A)

== Fantails ==
Order: Passeriformes Family: Rhipiduridae

The fantails are small insectivorous birds which are specialist aerial feeders.

- Streaked fantail, Rhipidura verreauxi (E)
- Gray fantail, Rhipidura fuliginosa (N)

== Monarch flycatchers ==
Order: Passeriformes Family: Monarchidae

The monarch flycatchers are small to medium-sized insectivorous passerines which hunt by flycatching.

- Southern shrikebill, Clytorhynchus pachycephaloides (N)
- Melanesian flycatcher, Myiagra caledonica (N)

== Crows, jays, and magpies ==
Order: Passeriformes Family: Corvidae

The family Corvidae includes crows, ravens, jays, choughs, magpies, treepies, nutcrackers and ground jays. Corvids are above average in size among the Passeriformes, and some of the larger species show high levels of intelligence.

- New Caledonian crow, Corvus moneduloides (E)

== Australasian robins ==
Order: Passeriformes Family: Petroicidae

Most species of Petroicidae have a stocky build with a large rounded head, a short straight bill and rounded wingtips. They occupy a wide range of wooded habitats, from subalpine to tropical rainforest, and mangrove swamp to semi-arid scrubland. All are primarily insectivores, although a few supplement their diet with seeds.

- Yellow-bellied robin, Eopsaltria flaviventris (E)

== Grassbirds and allies ==
Order: Passeriformes Family: Locustellidae

The family Locustellidae is a group of small insectivorous passerine birds. Most are of generally undistinguished appearance, but many have distinctive songs.

- New Caledonian thicketbird, Megalurulus mariei (E)

== Swallows ==
Order: Passeriformes Family: Hirundinidae

The family Hirundinidae is adapted to aerial feeding. They have a slender streamlined body, long pointed wings and a short bill with a wide gape. The feet are adapted to perching rather than walking, and the front toes are partially joined at the base.

- Pacific swallow, Hirundo tahitica (N)
- Welcome swallow, Hirundo neoxena (N)
- Tree martin, Petrochelidon nigricans (A)

== Bulbuls ==
Order: Passeriformes Family: Pycnonotidae

Bulbuls are medium-sized songbirds. Some are colourful with yellow, red or orange vents, cheeks, throats or supercilia, but most are drab, with uniform olive-brown to black plumage. Some species have distinct crests.

- Red-vented bulbul, Pycnonotus cafer (I)

== White-eyes, yuhinas, and allies ==
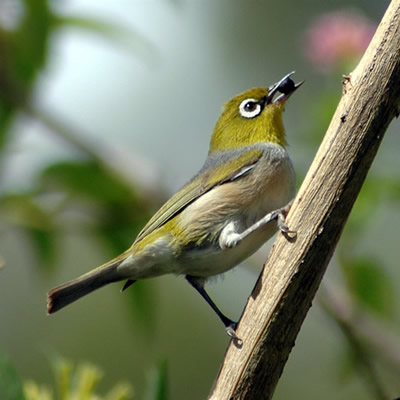
Silvereye

Order: Passeriformes Family: Zosteropidae

The white-eyes are small and mostly undistinguished, their plumage above being generally some dull colour like greenish-olive, but some species have a white or bright yellow throat, breast or lower parts, and several have buff flanks. As their name suggests, many species have a white ring around each eye.

- Large Lifou white-eye, Zosterops inornatus (E)
- Green-backed white-eye, Zosterops xanthochrous (E)
- Small Lifou white-eye, Zosterops minutus (E)
- Silvereye, Zosterops lateralis (N)

== Starlings ==
Order: Passeriformes Family: Sturnidae

Starlings are small to medium-sized passerine birds. Their flight is strong and direct and they are very gregarious. Their preferred habitat is fairly open country. They eat insects and fruit. Plumage is typically dark with a metallic sheen.

- Striated starling, Aplonis striata (E)
- European starling, Sturnus vulgaris (A)
- Common myna, Acridotheres tristis (I)

== Thrushes and allies ==
Order: Passeriformes Family: Turdidae

The thrushes are a group of passerine birds that occur mainly in the Old World. They are plump, soft plumaged, small to medium-sized insectivores or sometimes omnivores, often feeding on the ground. Many have attractive songs.

- New Caledonian island-thrush, Turdus xanthopus (E)
- White-headed island-thrush, Turdus pritzbueri (N)
- Vanikoro island-thrush, Turdus vanikorensis (Ex)

== Waxbills and allies ==
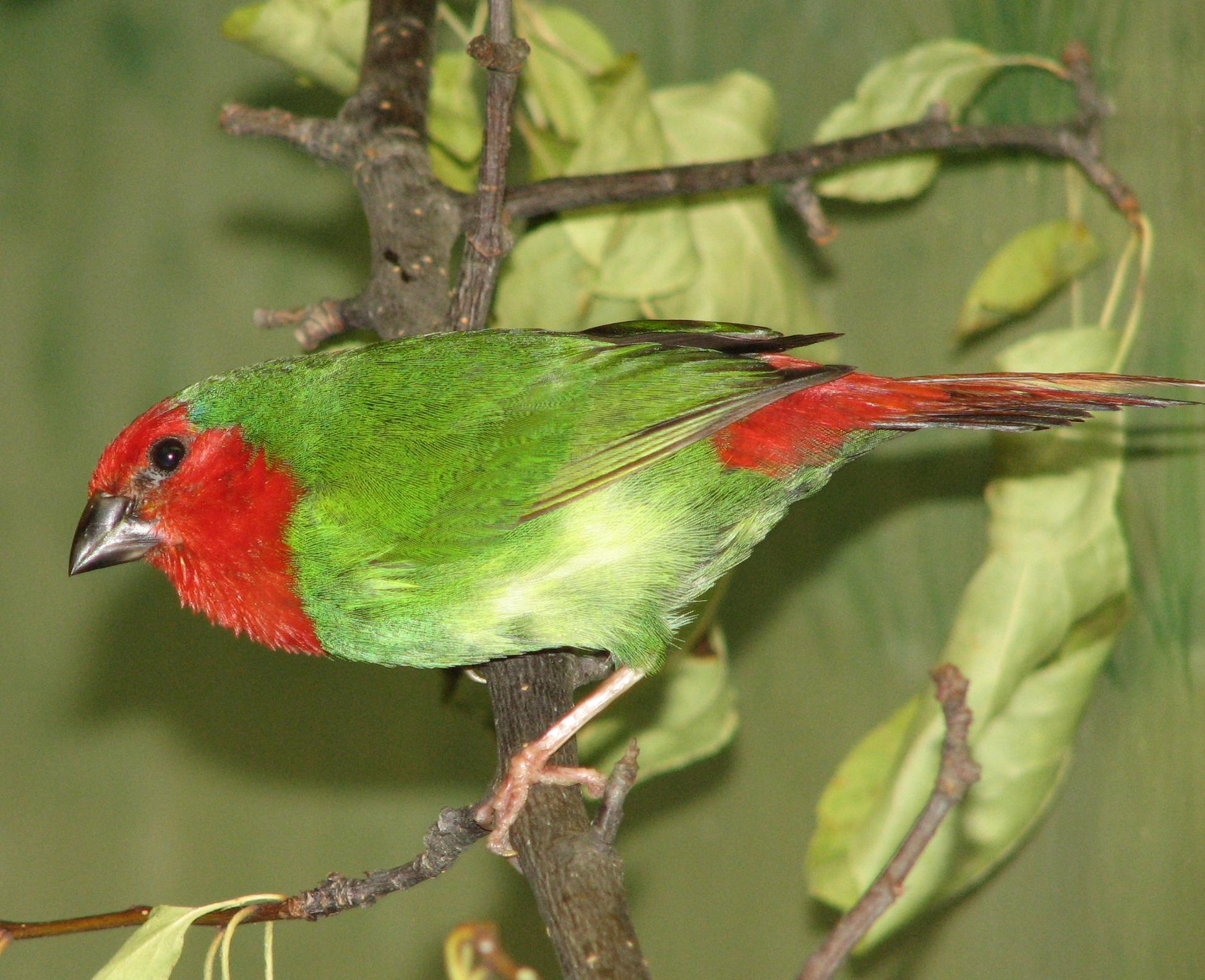
Red-throated parrotfinch

Order: Passeriformes Family: Estrildidae

The estrildid finches are small passerine birds of the Old World tropics and Australasia. They are gregarious and often colonial seed eaters with short thick but pointed bills. They are all similar in structure and habits, but have wide variation in plumage colours and patterns.

- Common waxbill, Estrilda astrild (I)
- Blue-faced parrotfinch, Erythrura trichroa (A)
- Red-throated parrotfinch, Erythrura psittacea (E)
- Chestnut-breasted munia, Lonchura castaneothorax (I)
- Java sparrow, Padda oryzivora (Ex)

== Old World sparrows ==
Order: Passeriformes Family: Passeridae

Old World sparrows are small passerine birds. In general, sparrows tend to be small, plump, brown or grey birds with short tails and short powerful beaks. Sparrows are seed eaters, but they also consume small insects.

- House sparrow, Passer domesticus (I)

== See also ==
- List of birds
- Lists of birds by region
