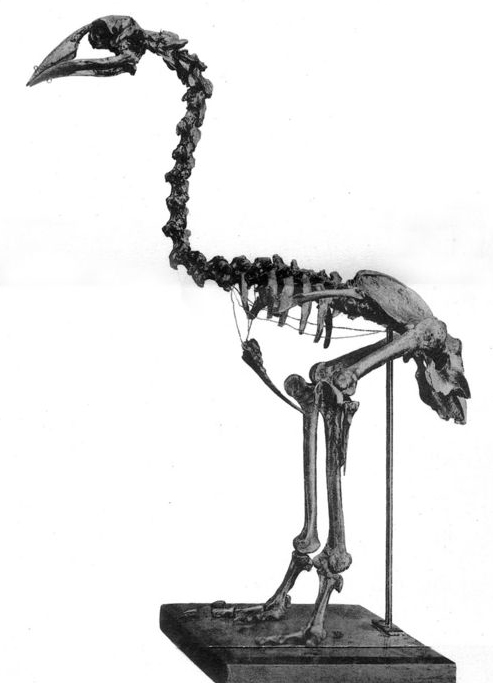
- Skeleton of A. otidiformis; Canterbury Museum

Conservation status
- Extinct (NZ TCS)(A. defossor)

- Extinct (NZ TCS)(A. otidiformis)

Scientific classification
- Kingdom: Animalia
- Phylum: Chordata
- Class: Aves
- Order: Gruiformes
- Family: †Aptornithidae; Mantell, 1848
- Genus: †Aptornis; Owen, 1844

Species
- †Aptornis otidiformis (Owen, 1844); †Aptornis defossor Owen, 1871; ?†Aptornis proasciarostratus Worthy, 2011

Synonyms
- Dinornis otidiformis Owen, 1844 (basionym); Apterornis (lapsus calami)

= Adzebill =

Adzebills Temporal range: Miocene–Holocene 19–0.005 Ma

Extinct genus of birds

The adzebills are two species of gruiform birds belonging to the genus Aptornis, the sole member of the extinct family Aptornithidae, which were endemic to New Zealand. The species were divided between the North Island and South Island of the country, with Aptornis otidiformis being the North Island adzebill, and Aptornis defossor being the South Island adzebill. Additional material from the Saint Bathans fauna may represent a third species.

== Taxonomy ==
Adzebills were first scientifically described by biologist Richard Owen in 1844, who mistook them for a small species of moa; the type species was initially named Dinornis otidiformis with the specific epithet referring to its comparable size with the great bustard (Otis tarda; otis + formis). Later on, the specimens' distinctions were recognised, so the genus Aptornis was erected to accommodate them; Aptornis is noted to be a syncope of Apterygiornis, an apparent allusion to the genus Apteryx. The alternate spelling Apterornis was coined a week earlier, though it was considered a likely typographical error and was not coined by nor ever used by Owen; a 1997 ICZN ruling rendered it invalid and conserved Aptornis, rendering it the valid name for this taxon.

The bird's common name likens its reinforced beak to the adze, a woodworking tool with the cutting edge perpendicular to the handle.

== Interrelationships ==
The placement of adzebills within Aves has long been contentious, with historical proposals to ally them with the Galloanserae, or the kagu of New Caledonia (Rhynochetidae), Its morphological resemblance to the kagu was considered to possibly be a result of convergent evolution, although New Zealand's proximity to New Caledonia (both being part of the same region of continental crust known as Zealandia, which had prehistorically been above sea level) has led some researchers to suggest the two shared a common ancestor which lived in prehistoric Gondwana; another Gondwanan bird, the sunbittern of South America, is the closest living relative of the kagu.

A 2011 genetic study recovered A. defossor as a gruiform, a lineage of birds which includes the cranes, coots, and moorhens. At the time, there were no available DNA sequences for A. otidiformis, but it was believed to be in the same genus.

In 2019 two studies came forth with more in-depth phylogenetic methods. The first from Boast et al. (2019) using data from near-complete mitochondrial genome sequences found adzebills to be closely related to the family Sarothruridae, gruiform birds known as flufftails. Another study by Musser and Cracraft (2019) was published shortly afterwards, using both morphological and molecular data, found support for adzebills to be closely related to trumpeters of the family Psophiidae instead; these authors took account of Boast et al. (2019) dataset and found that the Aptornithidae-Sarothruridae clade needed 18 more steps compared to Aptornithidae-Psophiidae; the latter classification is thus considered more likely (maximum parsimony).

A 2025 paper recovered Nesotrochis (within the monotypic family Nesotrochidae) to be the sister taxon of the adzebill family. Below is the result of their phylogenetic analysis, using the BEAST program to analyze 9,615 base pairs of mitochondrial DNA:

- Gruiformes
  - Gruoidea
    - Psophiidae
      - Psophia crepitans
    - - Aramidae
        Aramus guarauna
      - Gruidae (cranes)
  - Ralloidea
    - Rallidae (incl. Rallinae & Himantornithinae)
    - Heliornithes
      - - Heliornithidae
          Heliornis fulica
      - - Sarothruridae
          - Mentocrex kioloides
          - - Sarothrura rufa
            - - Rallicula forbesi
              - Sarothrura ayresi
        - - Nesotrochidae
            Nesotrochis steganinos
          - Aptornithidae
            - Aptornis defossor
            - Aptornis otidiformis

== Description ==
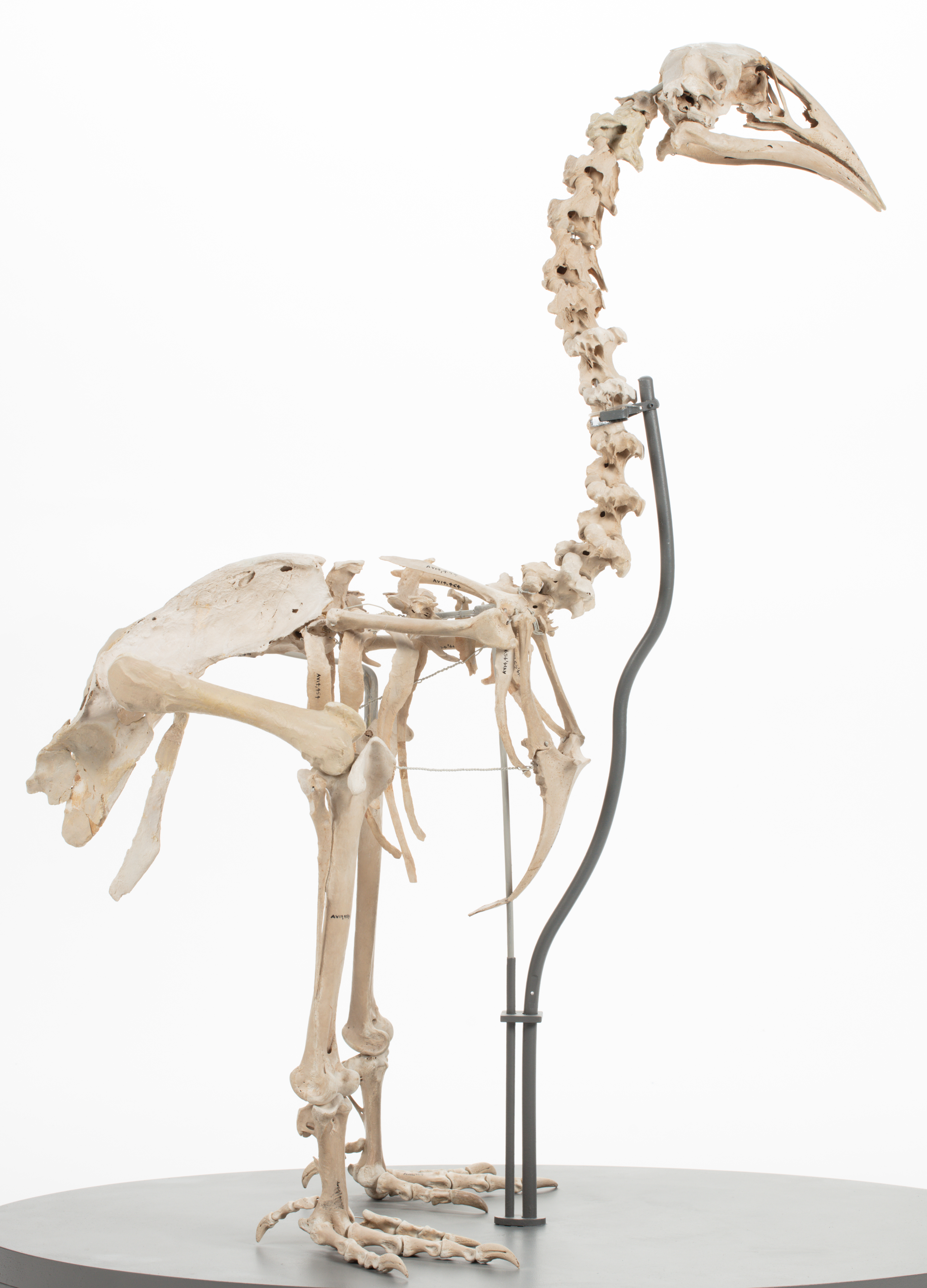
Aptornis defossor; Auckland Museum

The adzebills were about 80 centimetres (31 in) in length with a weight of 18 kilograms (40 lb), making them about the size of small moa (with which they were initially confused on their discovery) with enormous downward-curving and pointed bill, and strong legs. They were flightless, possessing extremely reduced wings with a uniquely reduced carpometacarpus; these wings were smaller proportionally than those of the dodo.

The two known species varied mostly in size with the North Island adzebill being the smaller species. Unlike moa, which in some species preserved soft tissue, the life appearance of Aptornis, such as coloration or feather types, is not directly known.

Fossils of a "very similar" species is known from the Miocene-epoch Saint Bathans fauna, being given the name ?Aptornis proasciarostratus; due to the fragmentary condition of the specimens, the describers deemed it possible that this animal belongs to another genus within Aptornithidae, thus the provisional nature of its placement in Aptornis.

== Habitat and behaviour ==
Their fossils have been found in the drier areas of New Zealand, and only in the lowlands. Richard Owen, who described the two species, speculated that it was an omnivore, and analysis of its bones by stable isotope analysis supports this. Levels of enrichment in ^{13}C and ^{15}N for two specimens of Aptornis otidiformis were compared with values for a moa, Finsch's duck and insectivores like the owlet-nightjars suggested that the adzebill ate species higher in the food chain than insectivores. They are thought to have fed on large invertebrates, lizards, tuatara and even small birds.

== Extinction ==
The adzebills were never as widespread as the moa but were subjected to the same hunting pressure as these and other large birds by the settling Māori (and predation of eggs/hatchlings by accompanying Polynesian rats and dogs). They became extinct before the arrival of European explorers. The Māori name for A. defossor was "ngutu hahau".

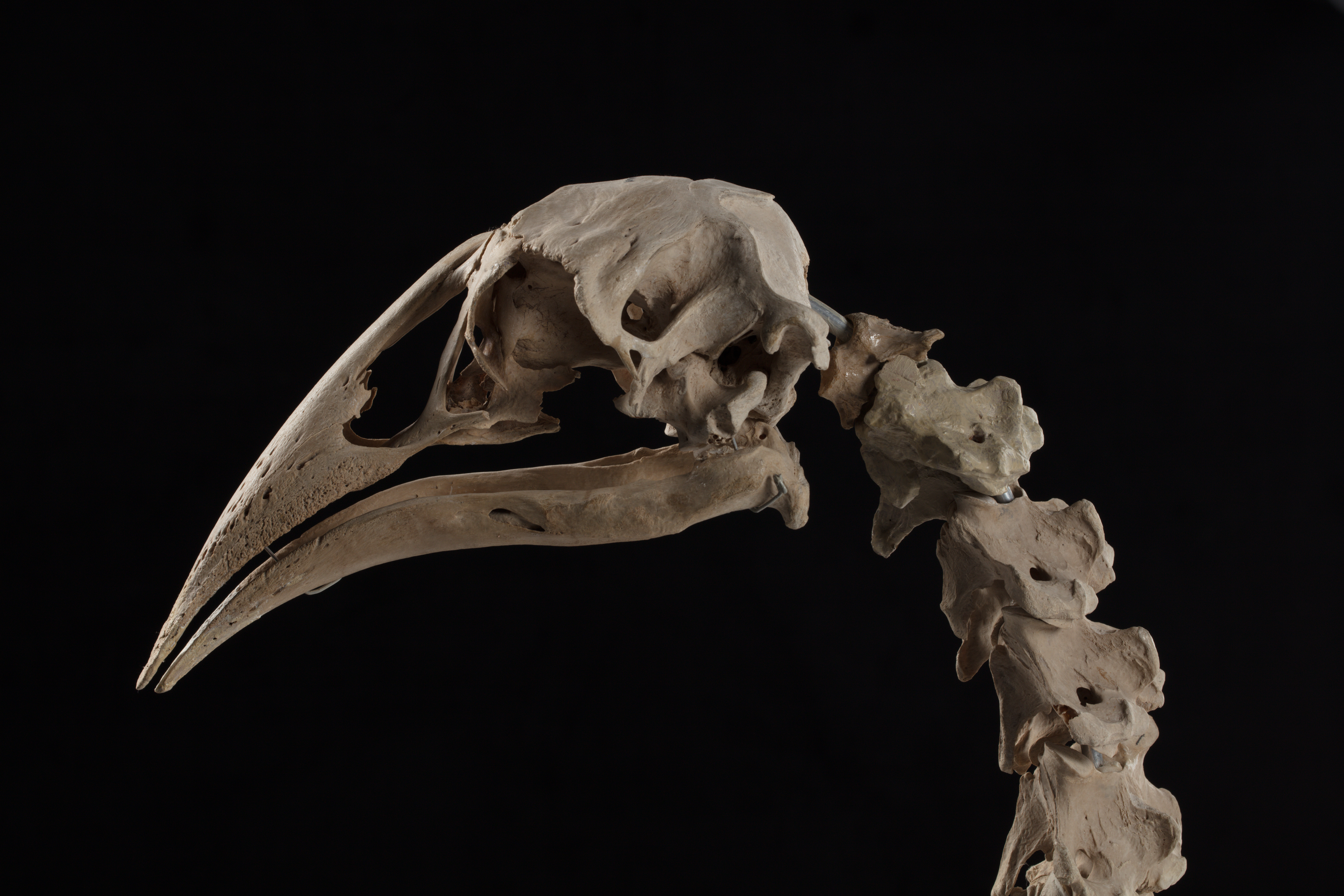
Aptornis defossor skull

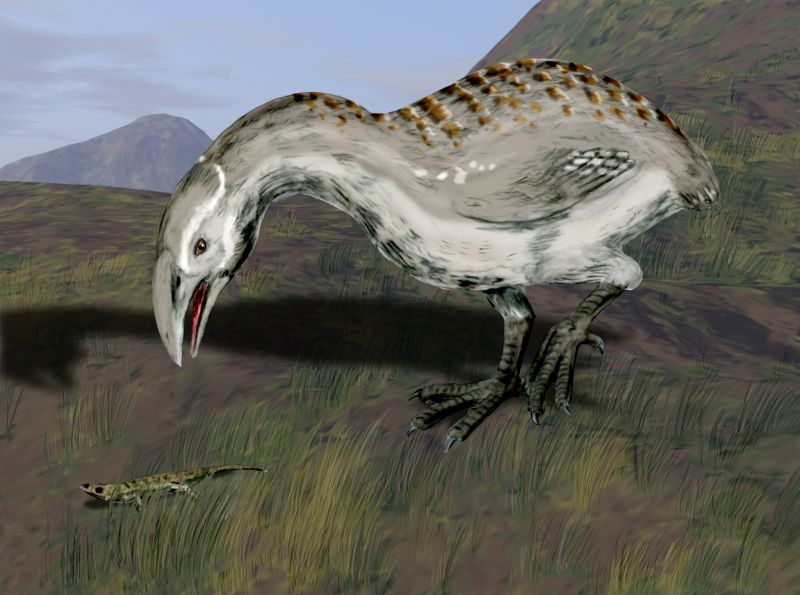
Restoration of A. otidiformis
