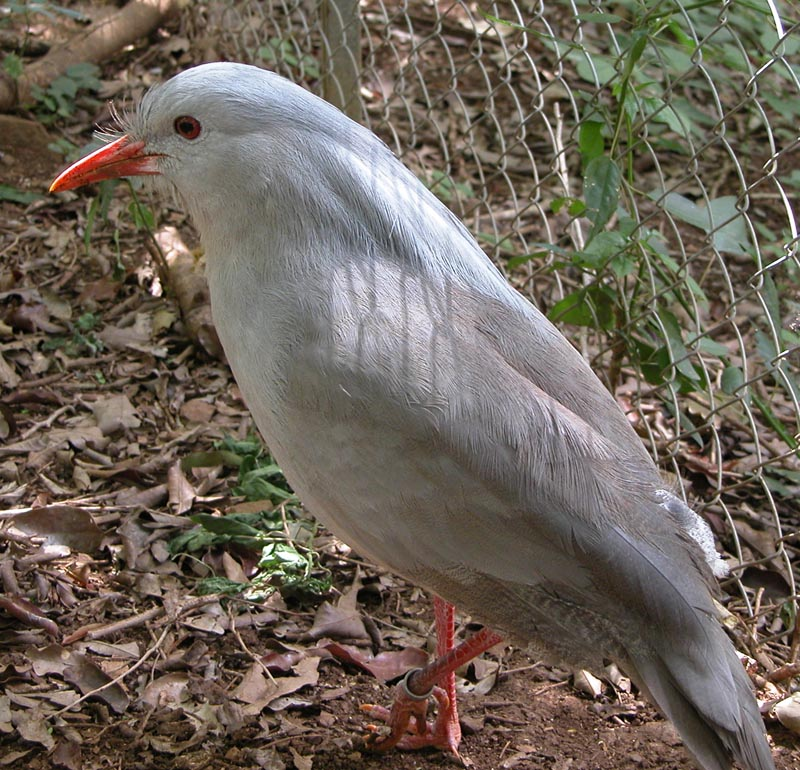

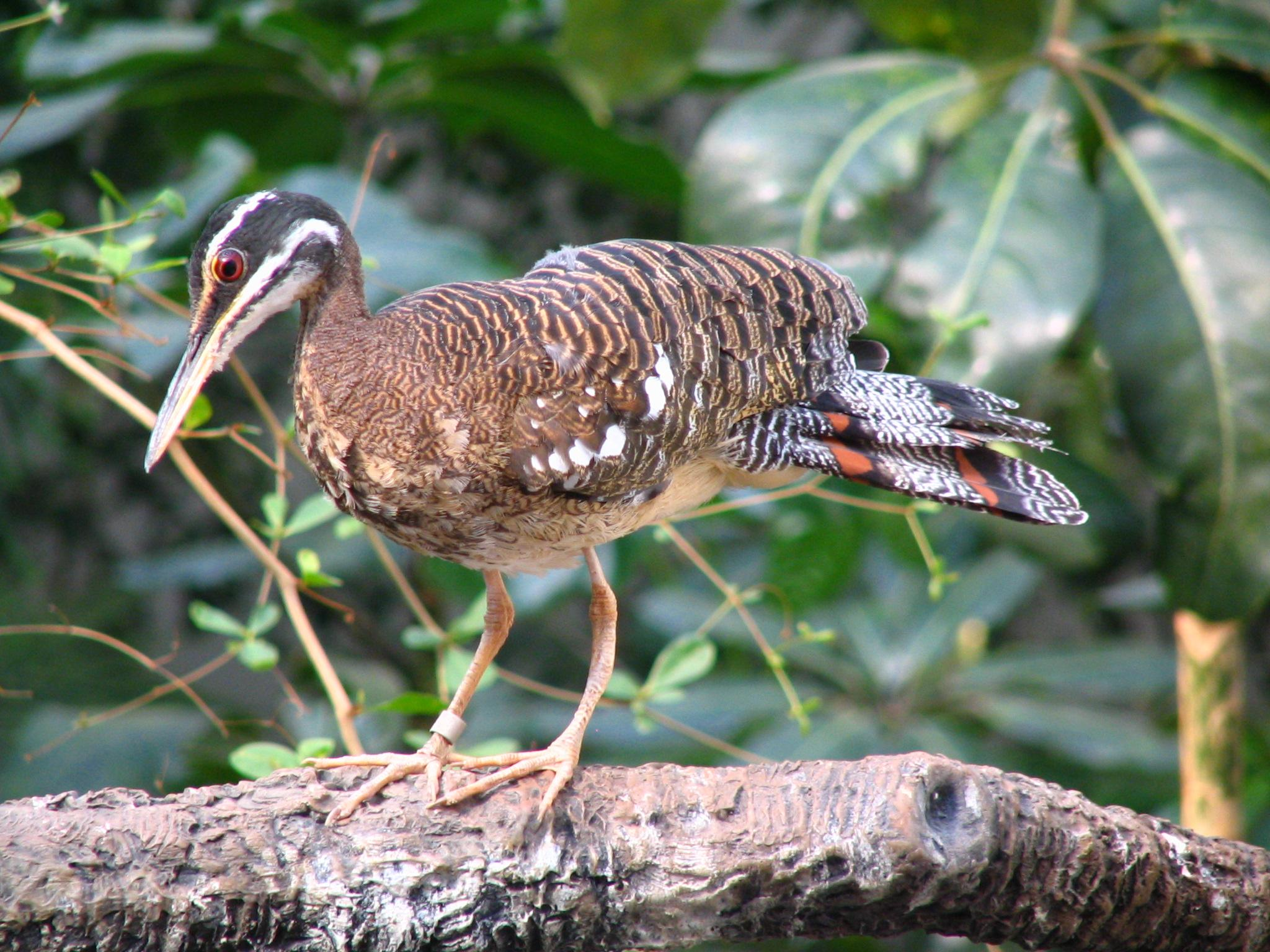

Scientific classification
- Kingdom: Animalia
- Phylum: Chordata
- Class: Aves
- Clade: Eurypygimorphae
- Order: Eurypygiformes; Hackett et al., 2008

Families
- Rhynochetidae; Eurypygidae

= Eurypygiformes =

Eurypygiformes Temporal range: Early Eocene to present

Order of birds

Eurypygiformes /jʊərɪˈpɪdʒɪfɔːrmiːz/ is an order formed by the kagus, comprising two species in the family Rhynochetidae endemic to New Caledonia, and the sunbittern (Eurypyga helias) from the tropical regions of the Americas. Its closest relatives appear to be the tropicbirds of the tropical Atlantic, Indian, and Pacific oceans.

== Classification ==
The affinities of Eurypygiformes are not very well resolved. The group consists of two families from a Gondwanan lineage of birds. Based on some morphological characteristics, they were initially classed as members of the family Ardeidae, and later the Gruiformes. According to Jarvis, et al.'s 2014 "Whole-genome analyses resolve early branches in the tree of life of modern birds", the group is distantly related to the Phaethontiformes. The oldest known fossil eurypygiform is an indeterminate fossil eurypygid from the Early Eocene-aged Green River Formation of the United States.

When seen as a gruiform, the kagu is generally considered related to the extinct adzebills from New Zealand and the sunbittern from Central and South America. Recent studies do indicate that the sunbittern is the closest living relative of the kagu. For example, Fain & Houde found these to be certainly sister taxa and Furo et al. indicated a close phylogenetic relationship between them by cytotaxonomy; they suggest that their common ancestor was separated by the Gondwana vicariance in South America and New Caledonia, respectively. They and the mesites did not group with traditional Gruiformes in their study, but instead with their proposed clade Metaves, which also includes the hoatzin, pigeons, Caprimulgiformes, flamingos, tropicbirds, Apodiformes, sandgrouse and grebes. The internal structure of this group was not well resolvable by their data, and contains numerous groupings not otherwise corroborated (such as Caprimulgidae and flamingos). The usefulness and monophyly of "Metaves" is therefore unclear. Notwithstanding, the kagu and sunbittern – and possibly the adzebills – seem to form a distinct Gondwanan lineage of birds, possibly one order, possibly more, even though the relationships between them, the mesites, and the "core Gruiformes" are not yet resolved. It is notable, however, that the sunbittern and the mesites possess powder down, whereas the "core Gruiformes" do not.

While the kagu is the only living species in the family Rhynochetidae, a larger species, the lowland kagu (Rhynochetos orarius), has been described from late Holocene subfossil remains. The body measurements of this species were 15% greater than Rhynochetos jubatus, with no overlap in measurements except those of the wings. Given that the sites where R. orarius has been found are all lowland sites, and that no fossils of R. jubatus were found in these sites, the scientists who described the fossils suggested they represented highland and lowland species, respectively. R. orarius is one of many species to have become extinct in New Caledonia after the arrival of humans. The validity of the species has been questioned by some authors, but accepted by others.

Fossil Messelornithidae once included in Eurypygiformes are now considered the oldest known members of Ralloidea (Gruiformes).

== Summary of extant species ==
Common name	Binomial name	Population	Status	Trend	Notes	Image
Kagu	Rhynochetos jubatus	250–999	EN	▼	Total population estimated to be 601-2,000 individuals.	
Sunbittern	Eurypyga helias	500,000–4,999,999	LC	▼	Estimate for mature individuals only.	
