= Lowland kagu =

Lowland kagu Temporal range: Late Holocene

Scientific classification
- Kingdom: Animalia
- Phylum: Chordata
- Class: Aves
- Order: Eurypygiformes
- Family: Rhynochetidae
- Genus: Rhynochetos
- Species: †R. orarius

Binomial name
- †Rhynochetos orarius Balouet & Olson, 1989

Extinct species of bird

The lowland kagu (Rhynochetos orarius) is a large, extinct species of kagu. It was endemic to the island of New Caledonia in Melanesia in the south-west Pacific region. It was described from subfossil bones found at the Pindai Caves paleontological site on the west coast of Grande Terre. The holotype is a right tibiotarsus (NCP 700), held by the Muséum national d'histoire naturelle in Paris. The specific epithet comes from the Latin orarius (of the coast) from its presumed lowland distribution, as opposed to its congener the living kagu R. jubatus.

== Description ==
The general proportions of the various bones of the lowland kagu are very similar to those of the kagu. They differ in the greater size of the extinct species in averaging about 15% larger, with no overlap between the hindlimb elements and only rare overlap between those of the wings. The describers postulate that R. orarius and R. jubatus were lowland and highland forms, respectively.

== Taxonomic uncertainty ==
In 2018, Jörn Theuerkauf and Roman Gula argued that R. orarius was not a valid species. They claimed that Balouet and Olson had overstated the larger size of R. orarius, and assigned all their found specimens to R. orarius but none to R. jubatus, which would be rare if there were two kagu species coexisting in the same island; that the extant kagu is also found in the lowlands, making speciation unlikely, and that no other two kagu species in Oceania share the same island. Instead, they proposed that there was only one kagu species in the Holocene of New Caledonia, R. jubatus, which decreased in average size after human colonization as a result of hunters and introduced predators like dogs favoring the capture of larger animals. This very same possibility had been raised by Balouet and Olson in their original paper and discounted as unlikely, but Theuerkaf and Gula pointed that similar rapid size changes have been documented in other vertebrates when exposed to new competitors and predators.
