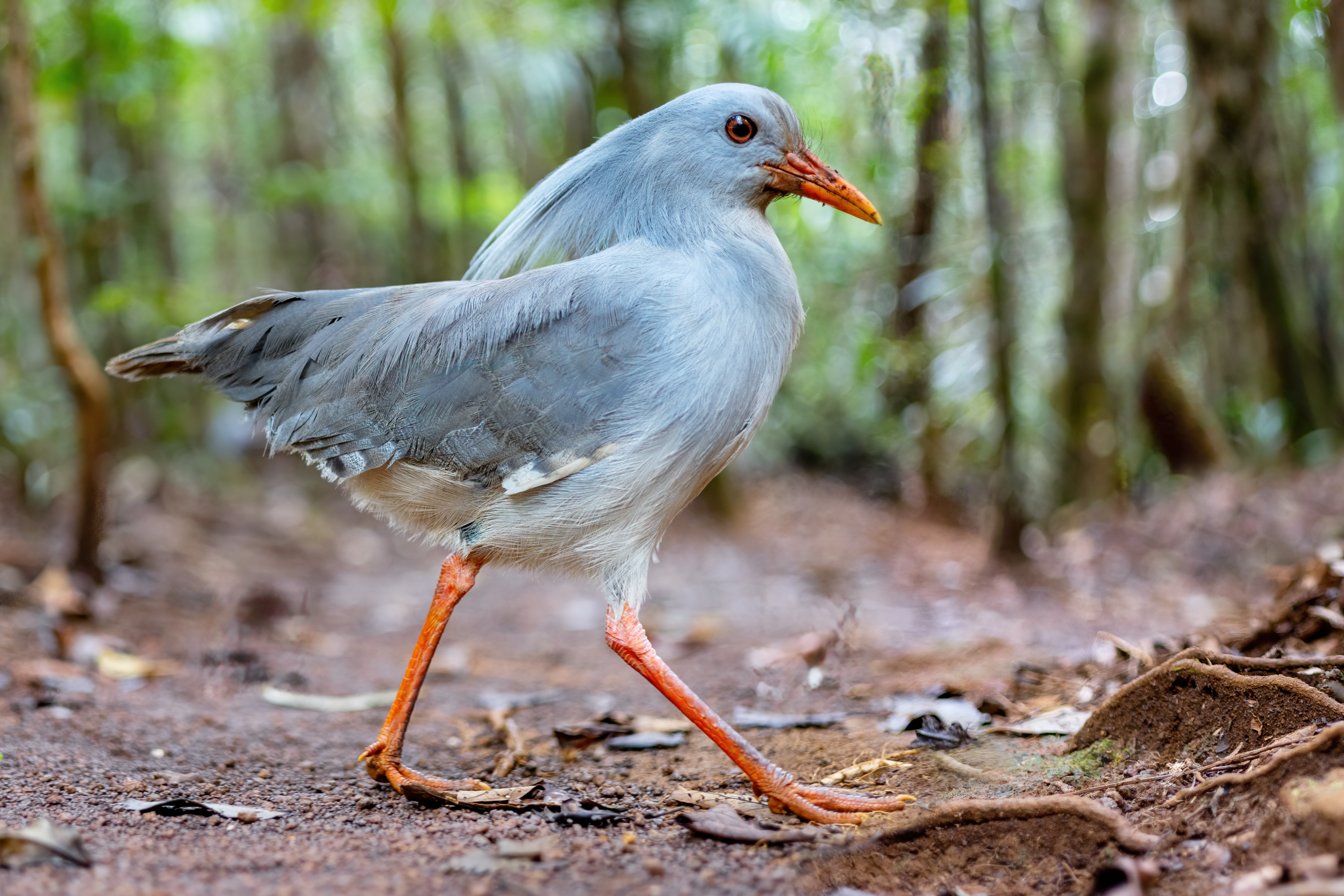

Conservation status
- Endangered (IUCN 3.1)
- CITES Appendix I

Scientific classification
- Kingdom: Animalia
- Phylum: Chordata
- Class: Aves
- Order: Eurypygiformes
- Family: Rhynochetidae
- Genus: Rhynochetos
- Species: R. jubatus

Binomial name
- Rhynochetos jubatus Verreaux, J & Des Murs, 1860

= Kagu =

Species of bird

The kagu or cagou (Rhynochetos jubatus) is a crested, long-legged, and bluish-grey bird endemic to the dense mountain forests of New Caledonia. It is the only surviving member of the genus Rhynochetos and family Rhynochetidae, although a second species has been described from the fossil record.

Measuring 55 cm (22 in) in length, it has pale grey plumage and bright red legs. Its nasal corns are a unique feature not shared with any other bird. Almost flightless, it spends its time on or near the ground, where it hunts its invertebrate prey and builds a nest of sticks on the forest floor. Both parents share incubation of a single egg and rearing the chick. It has proven vulnerable to introduced predators and is threatened with extinction.

== Etymology ==
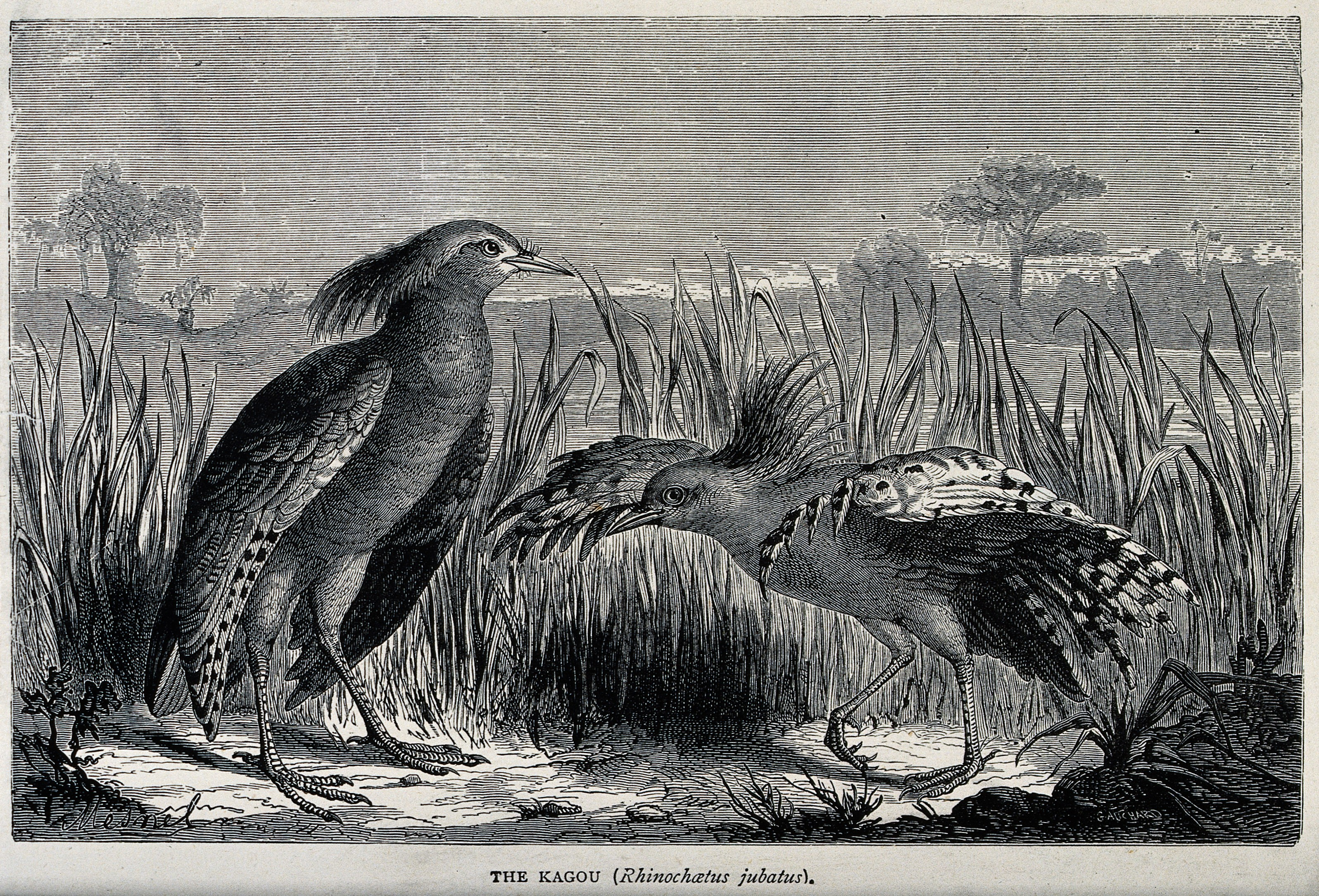
Wood engraving of a pair, by F. J. Gauchard

The name kagu is derived from the Melanesian names for the species. The species is variously known as the kavu or kagou in the Kanak languages, and as the cagou in French (also used as an alternative spelling in English).

== Taxonomy and systematics ==
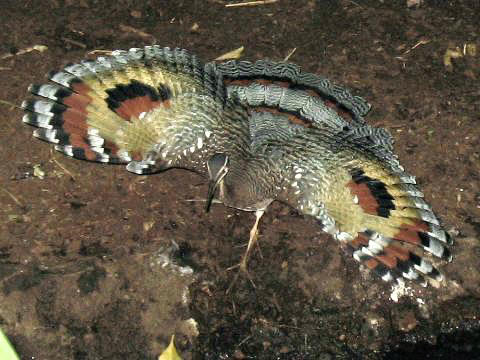
The sunbittern, a possible closest relative from Central and South America

The generic name Rhynochetos and the family name Rhynochetidae are derived from the Greek ῥίς rhis meaning "nose" and χαίτη khaitē meaning "long hair", referring to its long, stiff hairs over the nostrils. The specific name jubatus is derived from the Latin iubātus meaning crested.

The kagu's affinities are not well resolved. It was long one of the most enigmatic birds and in more recent times is usually affiliated with the Gruiformes. It was initially classed as a member of the clade Ardeae because of the presence of powder down, similarities in plumage colour and internal anatomy, the colour of the chicks and eggs, and the change in colouration of the chick as it grows.

When seen as a gruiform, the kagu is generally considered related to the extinct adzebills from New Zealand and the sunbittern from Central and South America. Recent studies do indicate that the sunbittern is the closest living relative of the kagu. For example, Fain and Houde found these to be certainly sister taxa. The mesites and they did not group with traditional Gruiformes in their study, but instead with their proposed clade Metaves, which also includes the hoatzin, pigeons, nightjars, flamingos, tropicbirds, Apodiformes, sandgrouse, and grebes. The internal structure of this group was not well resolvable by their data, although later studies confirmed a close relationship between the kagu and sunbittern.

The kagu and sunbittern, and possibly the adzebills, seem to form a distinct Gondwanan lineage of birds, either as one order or possibly more, although the relationships between them and groups previously considered related, such as the mesites and the "core" Gruiformes are not yet resolved. The sunbittern and the mesites, notably, possess powder down, too, whereas the "core" Gruiformes do not. The ancestors of the kagu are believed to have diverged from the sunbittern in the Oligocene, 45 to 17 million years ago, and colonized New Caledonia 60 to 25 million years ago. In the absence of terrestrial predators, it eventually became flightless.

While the kagu is the only living species in the Rhynochetidae, a larger species, the lowland kagu (Rhynochetos orarius), has been described from Holocene subfossil remains. The measurements of this species were 15% bigger than R. jubatus, with no overlap in measurements except those of the forelimbs. Given that the sites from which R. orarius remains have been recovered are all lowland sites, and that no fossils of R. jubatus have been found in these sites, the scientists who described the fossils have suggested that they represent highland and lowland species, respectively. R. orarius is one of many species to have become extinct in New Caledonia after the arrival of humans. The validity of the species has been questioned by some authors, but accepted by others.

== Description ==
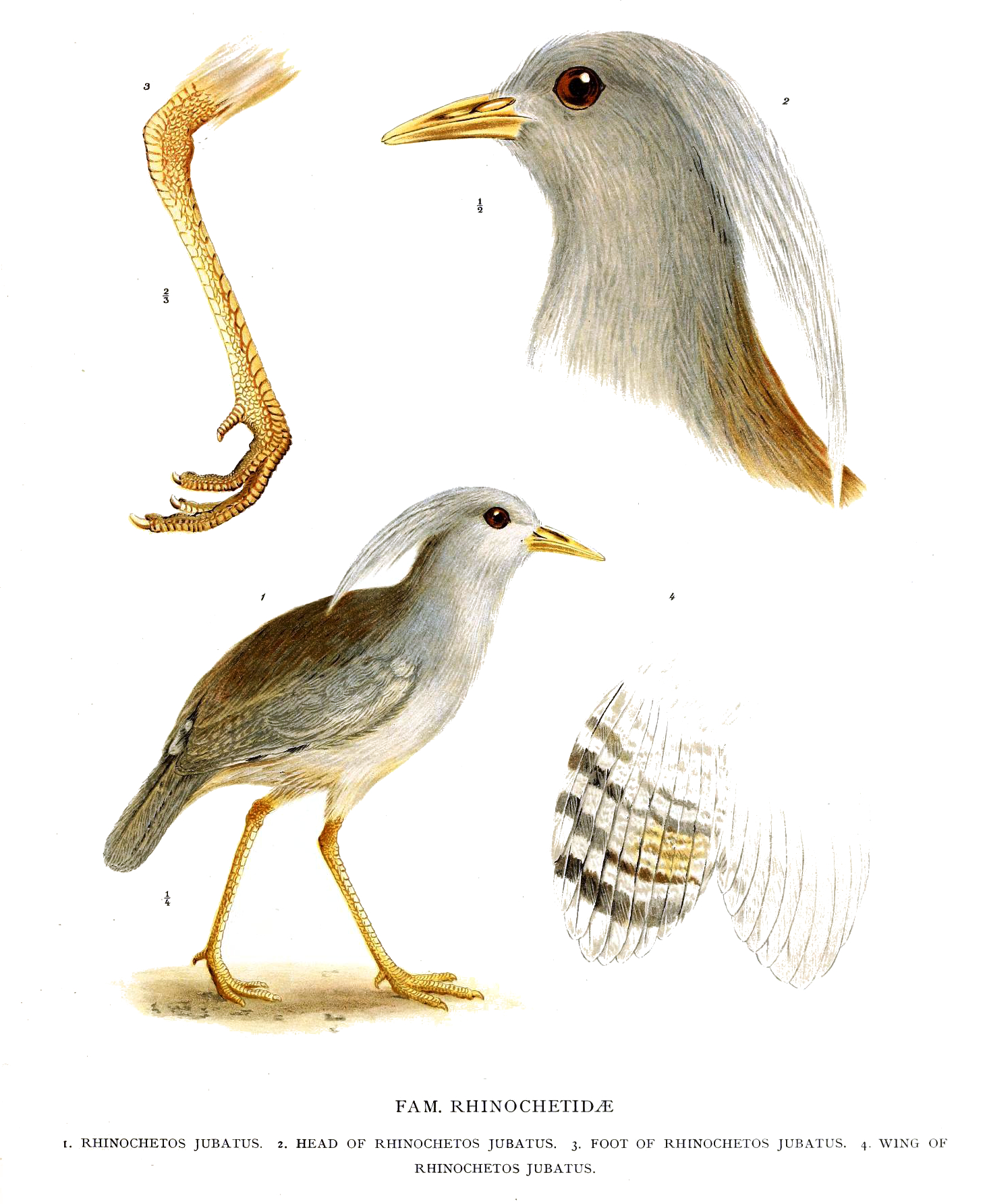
Illustration of Kagu by Philogène Wytsman, 1913

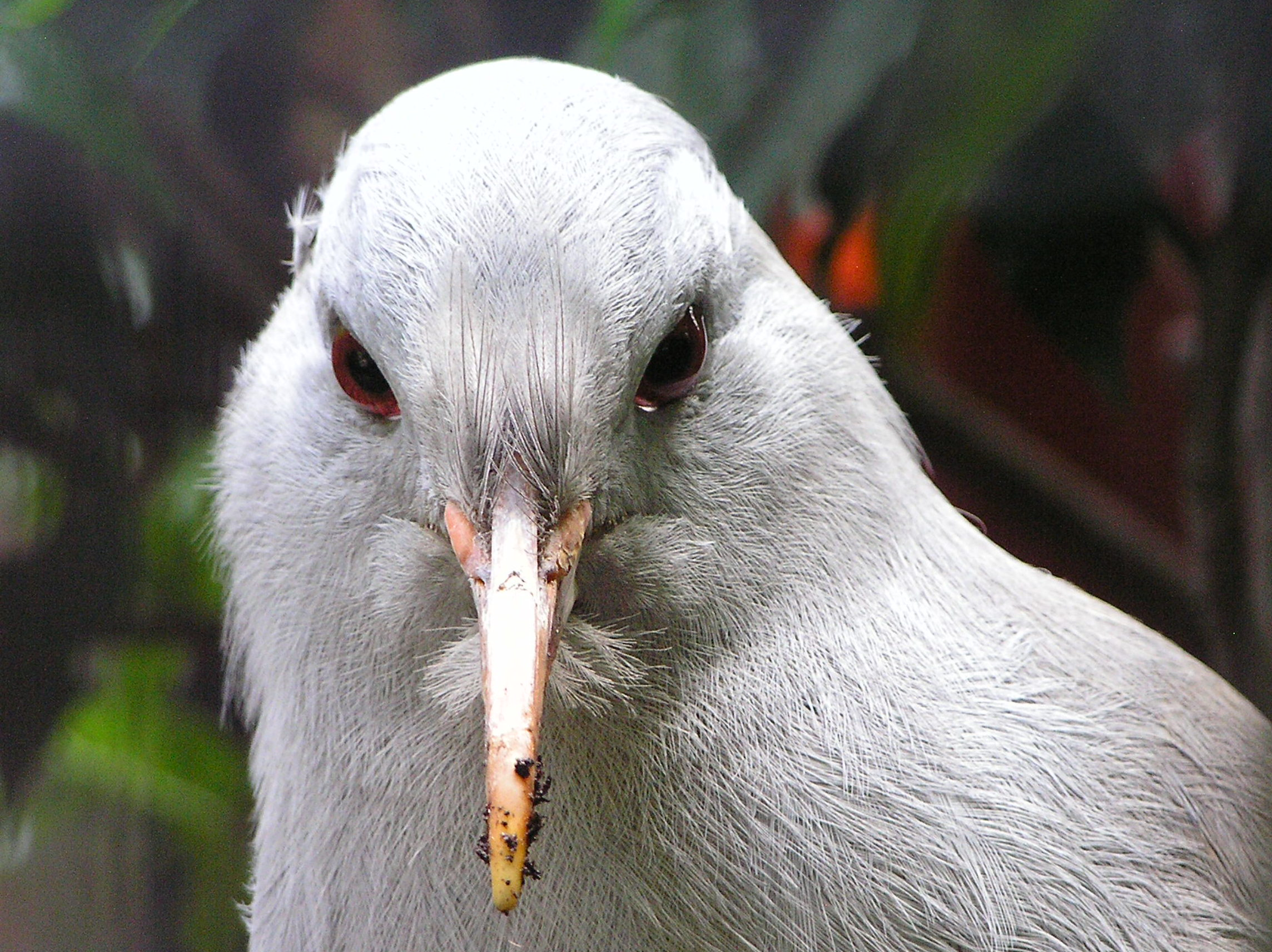
The kagu possesses nasal corns, structures covering its nostrils, which are a feature not shared by any other bird.

The kagu is a ground-living bird, 55 cm (22 in) in length. The weight can vary considerably by individual and by season, ranging from 700–1,100 g (25–39 oz). Its plumage is unusually bright for a bird of the forest floor; ash-grey and white coloured. Little sexual dimorphism is seen beyond a difference in the amount of barring in the primary feathers. It possesses powder down, which helps keep it dry and insulates it in the extremes of New Caledonia's tropical climate. The crest, which is used to display to other members of the species, is barely noticeable when at rest, but can be erected and fanned out.

It is nearly flightless, using its wings for displays (its primary wing feathers are patterned) and moving quickly through the forest. It can also use them to glide when fleeing danger. The wings are not reduced in size like in most other flightless birds, and have a span around 77.5 cm (30.5 in), but they lack the musculature for flight. These wings are also used for a "broken-wing" display, a behaviour shared with its related sunbittern, used to fake an injury and draw the attention of a predator away from its chick. It possesses bright red legs, which are long and strong, enabling the bird to travel long distances and run quickly.

It has large eyes, positioned so that they give good binocular vision, which is helpful in finding prey in the leaf litter and seeing in the gloom of the forest. It possesses nasal corns, structures covering its nostrils, which are a feature not shared by any other bird. These are presumed to prevent particles entering the nostrils when probing in soil during feeding. Another unique characteristic of the species is that it has only one-third as many red blood cells and three times more hemoglobin per red blood cell than is usual in birds.

== Distribution and habitat ==
The kagu is endemic to the forests and shrubland of New Caledonia. Within that island group, it is restricted to the main island of Grande Terre. No evidence of its occurrence on the Loyalty Islands has been found, although fossil remains of the extinct lowland form R. orarius have been found on the Isle of Pines. The kagu is a habitat generalist and survives in a range of different forest types if sufficient prey is present, from rain forest to drier lowland forest. It can also feed in some drier shrubland associated with the island's ultramafic rocks, although not in the poorest, low-prey shrubland of this type. It is also absent from areas where extensive ground cover makes foraging difficult, such as grassland or areas with high fern cover, but may pass through such areas to reach other foraging areas. The species has undergone some range contraction due to hunting and predation by introduced species. Its original, prehuman distribution and the extent to which it and its sister species R. orarius coexisted in lowland areas of New Caledonia are still not fully understood and await further research into the subfossil record.

== Behaviour and ecology ==
The kagu is territorial, maintaining year-round territories around 10–28 hectares (25–69 acres). The species has a clan-based social organization, with families composed of one breeding female and one to three breeding males. Male offspring also help to defend their parents' territorial claims. The social organisation of the kagu, though, has been disrupted in recent years due to attacks by dogs. Cases where either the breeding male or female have been killed have led to nonfraternal polyandrous behaviour. Cooperative and unrelated polyandry is rare in birds, but has been seen in species such as the dunnock and the Tasmanian nativehen.

Within the territory, the pairs are solitary during the nonbreeding season and may have separate but overlapping foraging areas. Kagus make a range of different sounds, most commonly while duetting in the morning, each duet lasting about 15 minutes. The kagu's crest and wings are used in territorial displays toward other kagus, slightly different displays are used toward potential predators. Territorial disputes may be resolved by fighting using wings and bills; in the wild, this seldom results in serious injuries.

=== Diet ===
The kagu is exclusively carnivorous, feeding on a variety of animals, with annelid worms, snails, and lizards being among the most important prey items. Also taken are larvae, spiders, centipedes, and insects, such as grasshoppers, bugs, and beetles. It has been reported to engage in worm charming to bring worms to the surface.

The majority of the diet is obtained from the leaf litter or soil, with other prey items found in vegetation, old logs, and rocks. Sometimes, kagus hunt small animals in shallow water. Their hunting technique is to stand motionless on the ground or from an elevated perch and silently watch for moving prey. They may stand on one foot and gently move the leaf litter with the other foot to flush prey. Having located prey, they move toward the prey and stand over it, ready to strike, or make a dash toward the prey from their watching location. Digging to obtain the prey, if needed, is done with the bill; the feet are not used to dig or scratch away debris.

=== Breeding ===
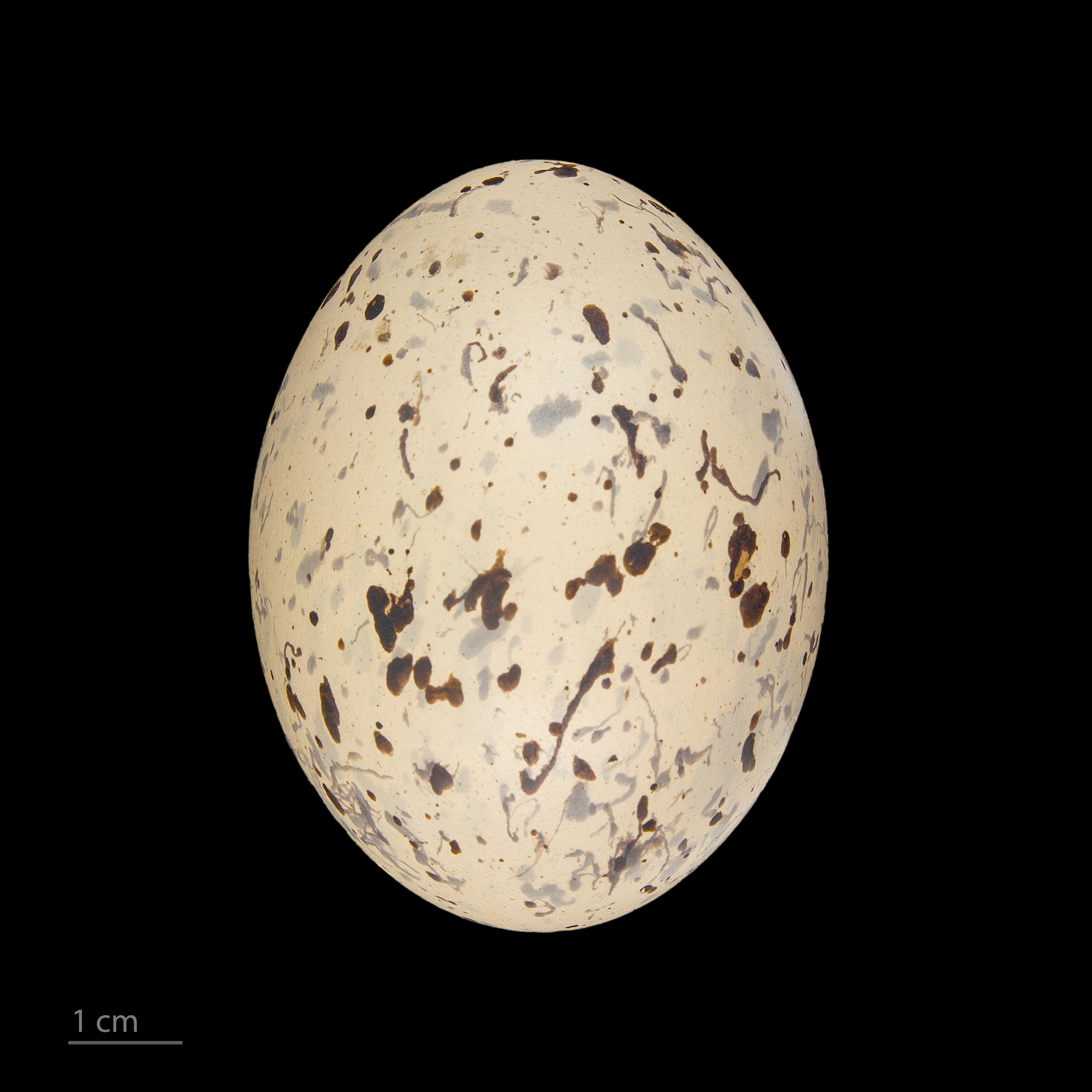
Rhynochetos jubatus egg, Muséum de Toulouse

Kagus are monogamous breeders, generally forming long-term pair bonds that are maintained for many years, even possibly life. They can be long lived, with birds in captivity living over 20 years. A single nesting attempt is made each year, although should the first nesting attempt fail, a second attempt is made that year. A simple nest is constructed, which is little more than a heaped pile of leaves, although in some cases, the egg may be laid directly on the ground. The nest is not concealed, but is usually adjacent to a tree trunk, log, or low vegetation. A single, grey, slightly blotched egg is laid, which weighs 60–75 g. Incubation duties are shared by the parents. Each bird incubates the egg for 24 hours, with the changeover occurring around noon each day. During each incubation stint, the parent remains on the egg the whole time except early in the morning, when the bird briefly moves away to call to its mate and occasionally forage quickly. The incubation period lasts for 33–37 days, which is long for the size of the egg.

Offspring may remain in their parents' territory for up to six years after fledging. These chicks do not help in incubating the eggs or raising the chicks, but nevertheless improve the breeding success of the parents. The older offspring do apparently help in territory defence, responding to playback of rivals and also participating in territorial fights, and this likely should be treated as a form of cooperative breeding. The kagu has also been observed adopting an unrelated chick, a behaviour more common in species with low reproductive output, high social organisation, and extensive parental care of the young, all traits shared by the kagu.

== Status and conservation ==
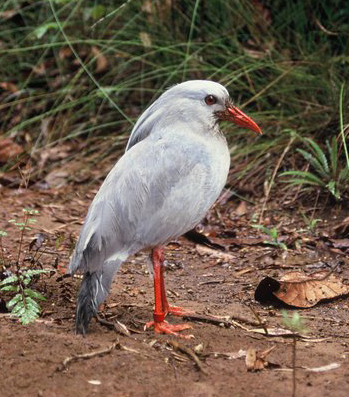
The current population of wild kagus is about 250–1000 birds, and the species is the focus of a decades-long conservation effort.

The kagu's initial decline was caused by subsistence hunting. The bird was trapped extensively for the European pet trade and for museums and zoos until it was afforded protection. It is threatened by introduced cats, pigs, and dogs. New Caledonia lacked mammals (except for bats) before the arrival of humans, and many of its native species have been negatively affected by introduced mammals. Rats have a big impact on nestlings, accounting for 55% of nestling losses. Kagus also suffer from habitat loss caused by mining and forestry.

Concern was first raised about the future of the kagu in 1904. A visiting American scientist noted in 1948 that the extinction of the species was probable, and identified the many threats the species faced. The first concrete evidence of the impact of dogs came when a New Zealand researcher's study population was quickly exterminated by dogs in the 1990s, although suspicions about the importance of dogs and other predators had been voiced before this and dog-control measures had been enacted in some areas in the 1980s. The kagu is listed as endangered (CITES I) and enjoys full protection in New Caledonia. It has been the subject of dedicated conservation efforts and is receptive to ex-situ conservation, breeding well in Nouméa Zoo. It is also prospering in Rivière Bleue Territorial Park, which has a pest-management programme and has been the site of releases into the wild of captive-bred birds.

Naturally occurring heavy metals in the soil may affect kagus through their food supply. Kagus in areas where soil levels of heavy metals were low laid more eggs and had higher numbers of fledglings, and had smaller home ranges and higher body mass than those in areas where the soil was heavy-metal rich. Kagu conservation is likely to be more effective in areas where heavy-metal levels in the soil are low.

== Relationship with humans ==
The kagu had an important role in the traditional lives of the Kanak tribes of New Caledonia. Among the tribes found in the vicinity of Hienghène in the north of Grande Terre, its name was given to people, its crest was used in the head-dresses of chiefs, and its calls were incorporated into war dances and considered messages to be interpreted by the chiefs. Kanaks in the vicinity of Houaïlou referred to the species as the "ghost of the forest".

The species was not discovered by Europeans until the French colonisation of New Caledonia in 1852 and was not described until a specimen was taken to the Colonial Exhibition in Paris in 1860. This led to a surge in scientific interest in the species, which resulted in many birds being trapped for museums and zoos. The species was also trapped for food and was considered a delicacy by European colonisers. It was also fashionable to own kagus as pets. A campaign was run from 1977–1982 to phase out the pet trade in kagus. Today, the kagu is considered very important in New Caledonia; it is a high-profile endemic emblem for the territory. Its distinctive song used to be played to the nation every night as the island's TV station signed off the air. Its survival is considered important for the territory's economy and image.

== See also ==
- Biodiversity of New Caledonia
