= Sunbittern =

Sunbittern Temporal range: Early Eocene to present
- on Cristalino River; Southern Amazon, Brazil

Conservation status
- Least Concern (IUCN 3.1)

Scientific classification
- Kingdom: Animalia
- Phylum: Chordata
- Class: Aves
- Order: Eurypygiformes
- Family: Eurypygidae; Selby, 1840
- Genus: Eurypyga; Illiger, 1811
- Species: E. helias

Binomial name
- Eurypyga helias (Pallas, 1781)
- Sunbittern range

Synonyms
- Ardea helias Pallas, 1781; Eurypyx helias

Audio
- Vocalization

Species of bittern-like bird

The sunbittern (Eurypyga helias) is a bittern-like bird of tropical regions of the Americas, and the sole member of the family Eurypygidae (sometimes spelled Eurypigidae) and genus Eurypyga. It is found in Central and South America, and has three subspecies. The sunbittern shows both morphological and molecular similarities with the kagu (Rhynochetos jubatus) of New Caledonia, indicating a Gondwanan origin, both species being placed in the clade Eurypygiformes.

== Taxonomy ==
The sunbittern was traditionally placed in the Gruiformes, but this was always considered preliminary. Altogether, the bird is most similar to another bird that was provisionally placed in the Gruiformes, the kagu (Rhynochetos jubatus). Molecular studies seem to confirm that the kagu and sunbittern are each other's closest living relatives and have a similar wing display. They are probably not Gruiformes (though the proposed Metaves are just as weakly supported). Altogether, the two species seem to form a minor Gondwanan lineage which could also include the extinct adzebills and/or the mesites, and is of unclear relation to the Gruiformes proper. Notably, the kagu and mesites also have powder down.

An indeterminate fossil eurypygid has been documented from the Green River Formation of Wyoming, USA. This specimen, known from a full skeleton, is the oldest and only known fossil of the group, and suggests that eurypygids had a much more northernly range in the past. This specimen has been figured in several studies, and was given the unofficial name "Eoeurypyga olsoni" in a 2003 dissertation, but as-of-yet remains unnamed.

=== Subspecies ===
The sunbittern was formerly treated as two species (E. helias and E. major), but now they are treated as a single species with considerable variation between the subspecies. The three subspecies are recognised on the basis of plumage characters and size. The three subspecies are allopatric.

- E. h. helias (Pallas, 1781) – Amazonian sunbittern
- E. h. major Hartlaub, 1844 – northern sunbittern
- E. h. meridionalis Berlepsch & Stolzmann, 1902 – foothill sunbittern

== Distribution and habitat ==
The sunbittern's range extends from Guatemala to Brazil. The nominate race, E. h. helias, is found east of the Andes in lowland tropical South America, from the Orinoco basin, through the Amazon basin and Pantanal. The subspecies E. h. meridionalis, has a more restricted distribution, being found along the East Andean slope in south-central Peru, in the lower subtropical zone at altitudes of 800–1,830 m (2,620–6,000 ft). The final subspecies, E. h. major, is found at various altitudes ranging from southern Guatemala, through Central America and the Chocó to western Ecuador. This subspecies may also be present in southern Mexico. It has been traditionally reported from the Atlantic slope of Chiapas, but no specimens are known and there have been no recent records.

The species is found in the humid Neotropical forests, generally with an open understorey and near rivers, streams, ponds or lagoons.

== Description ==
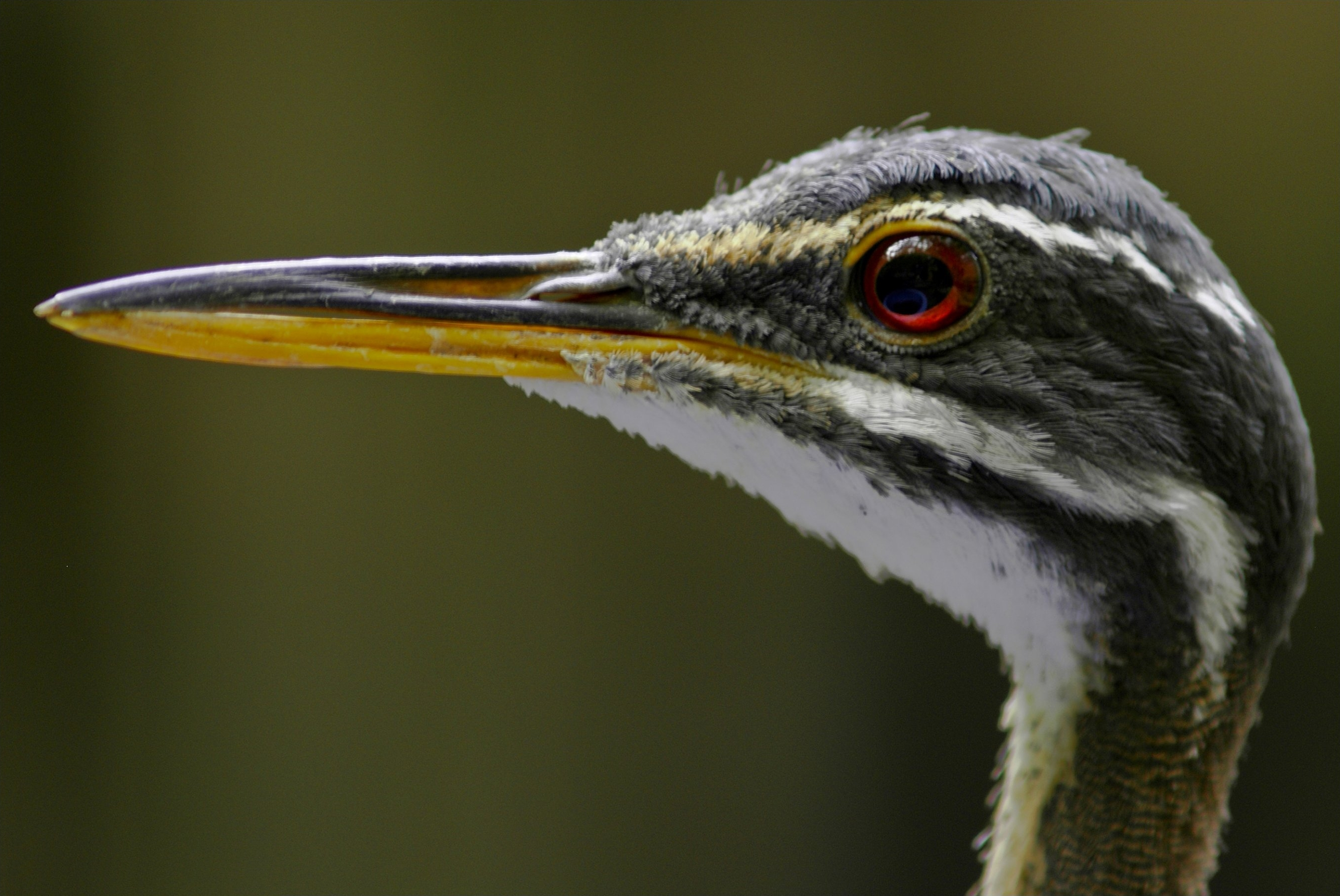
Head

The bird has a generally subdued coloration, with fine linear patterns of black, grey and brown. Its remiges however have vividly colored middle webs, which with wings fully spread show bright eyespots in red, yellow, and black. These are shown to other sunbitterns in courtship and threat displays, or used to startle potential predators. Male and female adult sunbitterns can be differentiated by small differences in the feather patterns of the throat and head. Like some other birds, the sunbittern has powder down.

The sunbittern has a long and pointed bill that is black above, and a short hallux as in shorebirds and rails. In the South American subspecies found in lowlands east of the Andes, the upperparts are mainly brown, and the legs and lower mandible are orange-yellow. The two other subspecies are greyer above, and their legs and bill are sometimes redder.

== Behaviour and ecology ==
They are cryptic birds that display their large wings, which exhibit a pattern that resemble eyes, when they feel threatened.

=== Feeding ===
The sunbittern consumes a wide range of animal prey. Insects form an important part of the diet, with cockroaches, dragonfly larvae, flies, katydids, water beetles and moths being taken. Other invertebrate prey includes crabs, spiders, shrimps and earthworms. They will also take vertebrate prey including fish, tadpoles, toads and frogs, eels and lizards.

Sunbitterns are one of 12 species of birds in five families that have been described as fishing using baits or lures to attract prey to within striking distance. This type of behaviour falls within the common definition of tool use. In sunbitterns this behaviour has only been observed in captive birds so far.

=== Breeding ===
Sunbitterns start nesting in the early wet season and before it starts they make flight displays 10–15 m (33–49 ft) high in the forest canopy. They build open nests in trees, and lay two eggs with blotched markings. The young are precocial, but remain in the nest for several weeks after hatching.

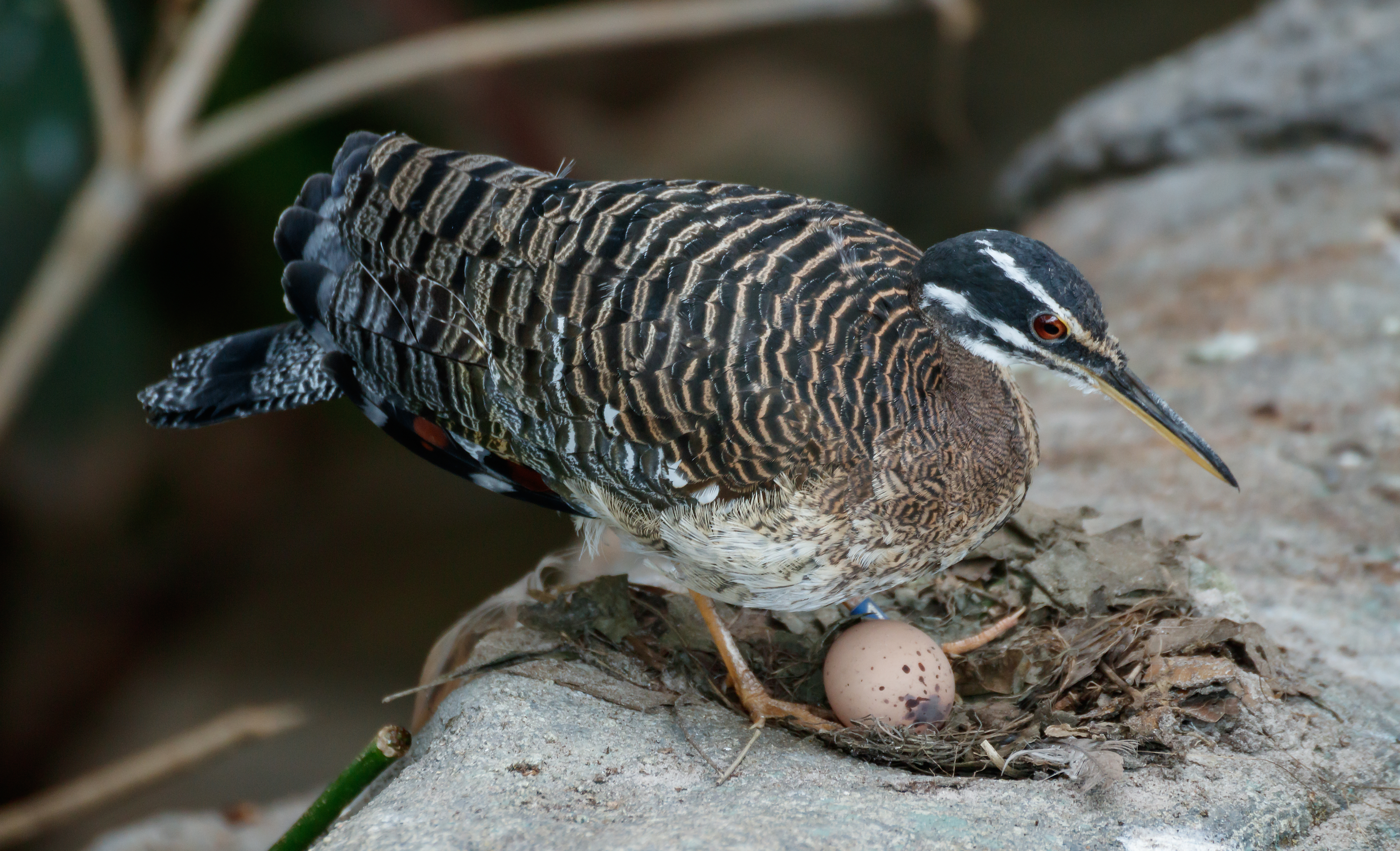
Breeding

== Gallery ==
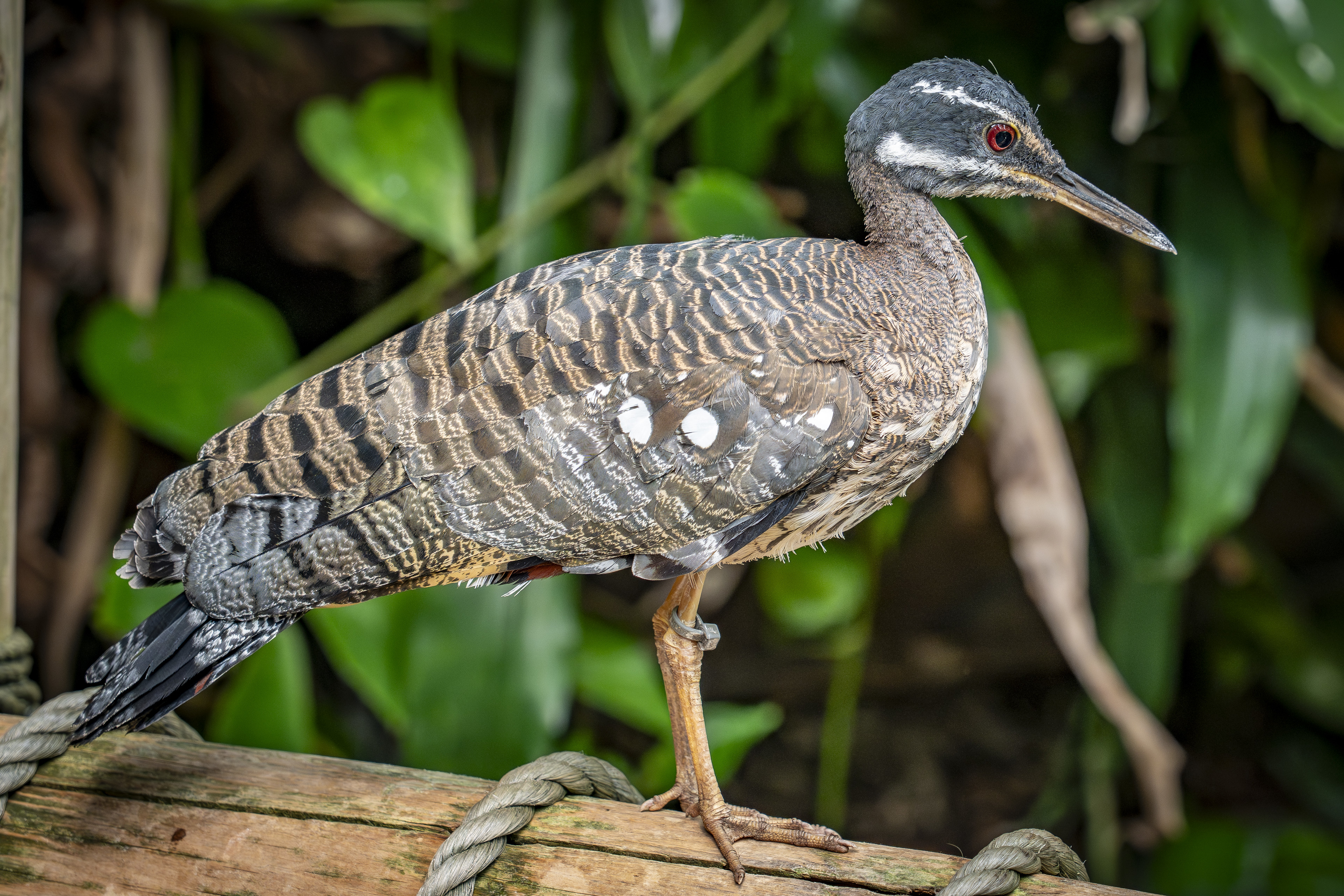
A sunbittern at the Woodland Park Zoo in Seattle, Washington, US

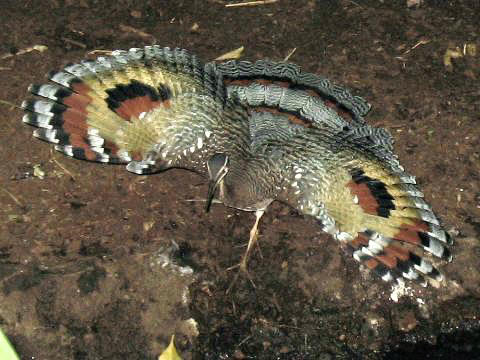
The sunbittern will open its wings to display two large eye spots when threatened.

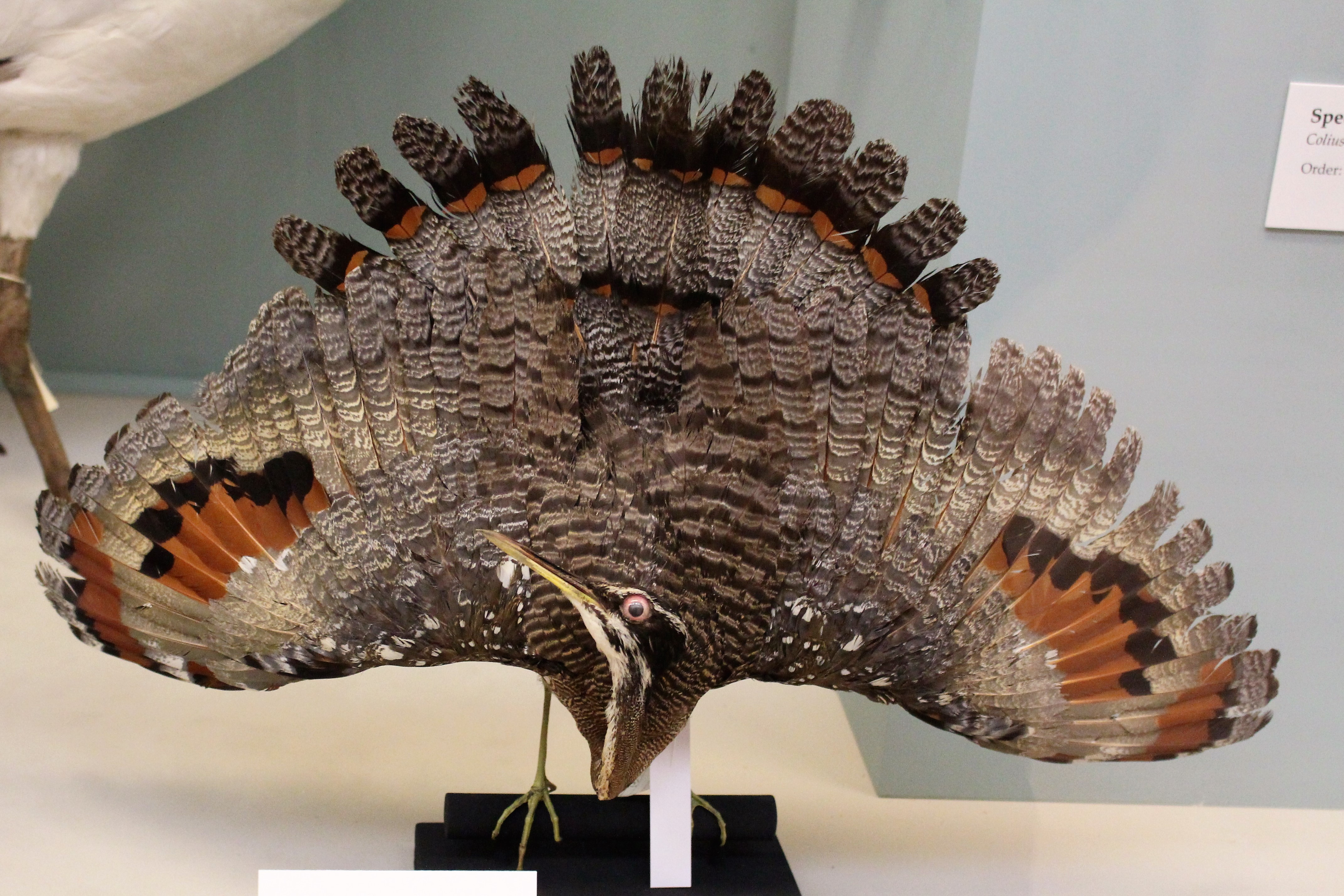
A sunbittern on display in the Natural History Museum, London
