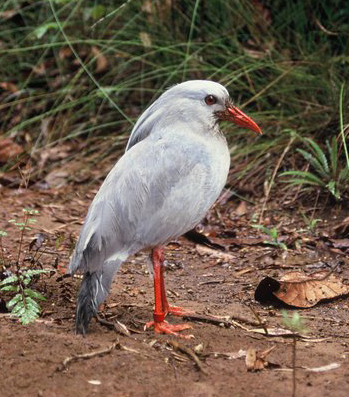
- Rhynochetos jubatus

Scientific classification
- Kingdom: Animalia
- Phylum: Chordata
- Class: Aves
- Order: Eurypygiformes
- Family: Rhynochetidae
- Genus: Rhynochetos; Verreaux & Des Murs, 1860

Species
- See text

= Rhynochetos =

Rhynochetos Temporal range: Late Holocene

Genus of birds

Rhynochetos is a genus of ground-dwelling birds in the monotypic family Rhynochetidae. It contains two species, both endemic to New Caledonia, one of which is extinct.

== Taxonomy ==
Rhynochetos jubatus is the only extant species of this genus and of the family Rhynochetidae. It is closely related to birds of the tropical Atlantic, Pacific and Indian oceans with its closest living relative being the sunbittern (Eurypyga helias). Currently there are two described species of Rhynochetos, however, it has been suggested that the extinct Rhynochetos orarius and the extant Rhynochetos jubatus are the same species.

== Species ==
- Rhynochetos jubatus Verreaux & Des Murs, 1860 – kagu
- †Rhynochetos orarius Balouet & Olson, 1989 – lowland kagu

== Description ==
Kagus are large, flightless birds described as something "between a small heron and a rail". Adults are about 55 centimetres (22 in) tall with uniform ash-grey plumage with distinct orange-red bills and legs. Characteristic of these birds are long crest feathers. They weigh between 700 and 1,000 grams (25 and 35 oz), with no significant size difference between males and females.

Herons can look anatomically similar but can be distinguished by the lack of bare red parts and uniform grey plumage.

== Habitat and distribution ==
Kagus are endemic to the small islands of New Caledonia in the South Pacific, measuring 8,000 square miles. They inhabit remote, dense tropical forest regions in valleys of the southern mountainous region, as well as tall shrublands in lesser numbers. They tend to avoid shallow shrublands and savannah-grassland habitats. Typically, they require a dense canopy layer as well as a thick litter layer in which they forage for food.

The distribution of kagus over the island is very fragmented due to a very patchy forest cover. The forests lie of ultrabasic rocks, which tend to have less extensive forest cover. On these rocks, forests are restricted to higher altitudes and along water systems. Dry season fires also contribute to decreasing forest cover and thus further fragmentation of kagu populations.

== Behaviour ==
=== Vocalizations ===
Kagus have distinct sex-specific songs which they sing in the early morning. These songs can carry for distances of up to 2 km. Mating pairs will often sing duets in the early morning, which may be territorial behaviour. Males tend to sing more frequently than females, and solitary songs tend to belong to males more often than females.

Kagu calls have been described as strange. They have various quiet hissing sounds and rattling calls.

=== Diet ===
Kagus forage most of the day for food in the litter layer and in low parts of trees and trunks. They are generalists, eating a wide variety of prey, from invertebrates such as earthworms, beetles and snails to lizards and small fish. Their food supply is influenced by seasonality, eating larger prey when there is more food availability, such as in wetter seasons. In drier seasons, kagus will eat smaller prey such as larvae. In wetter seasons, when food is more available, they will spend less of the day foraging and carry out other activities, such as preening.

=== Reproduction ===
Kagu pairs nest in large permanent territories. Outside of breeding the male and the female will live separately within their shared territory. There is no well-defined breeding season, however, pairs tend to have more breeding attempts during wetter periods. Some young may remain in their parent's territory for several years, even helping in rearing younger siblings.

Kagus raise on average about one hatchling yearly. The amount of breeding attempts of kagus are very variable, with any from 0-7 breeding attempts per year possible until a successful breeding attempt takes place. They will lay and incubate a single egg for about 5 weeks. At 3 days old, the parents will feed the chick during the day and brood at night. This will occur for 2 months, at the end of which the fledgling will be two thirds of its adult body size. The fledgling will typically be fed until it reaches 3.5 to 4 months of age. Kagus have long lifespans, with many living 20 to 30 years in captivity.

== Threats to conservation ==
Prior to the discovery of the island by Captain James Cook in 1774, there was a healthy population of both species of Rhynochetos. Following the discovery of the island, various human activities threatened the stability of kagu populations. The kagus began being trapped heavily, both for its meat and for its export. The beautiful display of the male led to its export around the world to zoos and museums. Introduced domestic animals, such as cats and dogs are a major threat to the kagus. They roam free around the island and eat adults, juveniles and eggs. Other human activity, such as logging and hunting has further fragmented their habitat. These birds tend to avoid human settlements; areas with increased human activity tend to have lower numbers. Maintenance of genetic diversity of the kagus is therefore threatened as further fragmentation is further isolating patches and may decrease migration between the patches.
