= Yandé Island =

Island of New Caledonia

Coordinates: 20°02′58″S 163°48′34″E

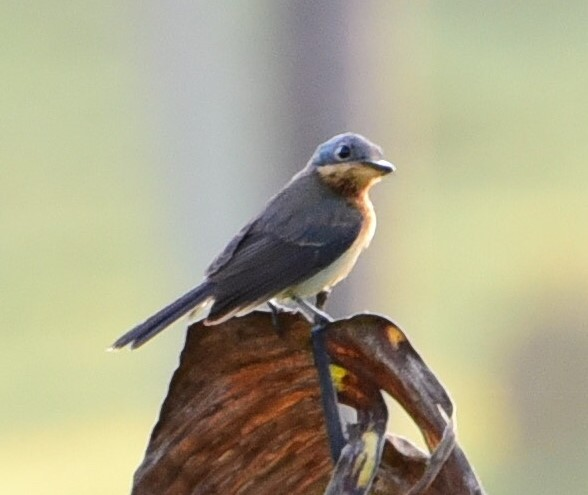
Melanesian flycatchers are resident on the island

Yandé Island is a 1,300 ha island lying some 20 km off the northern end of Grande Terre, the principal island of the French Territory of New Caledonia in Melanesia in the south-west Pacific Ocean.

== Description ==
The island is about 6 km long by 4 km wide with a maximum height of 300 m. It is formed of peridotites and has a rugged terrain with steep slopes and rocky coasts. The eastern and northern coast has steep cliffs and small sandy bays located at valley outlets. The west coast has gentler topography with a fringing reef enclosing a lagoon with coastal mangroves. Much of the island is covered with scrub vegetation, but there are areas of dry forest and niaouli.

In 2007, Conservation International New Caledonia carried out coral-reef surveys in the north-west lagoon between Koumac and Yandé as part of a Marine Rapid Assessment Program in Province Nord.

=== Important Bird Area ===
The island has been recognised as an Important Bird Area (IBA) by BirdLife International because it supports populations of red-bellied fruit doves, white-bellied goshawks, grey-eared honeyeaters, New Caledonian myzomelas, fan-tailed gerygones, New Caledonian whistlers, long-tailed trillers, Melanesian flycatchers, green-backed white-eyes and striated starlings. The island is also one of only two known locations where the New Caledonian island thrush is currently found, the other being Néba Island.
