= Mont Panié =

Mountain in New Caledonia

- Taaluny
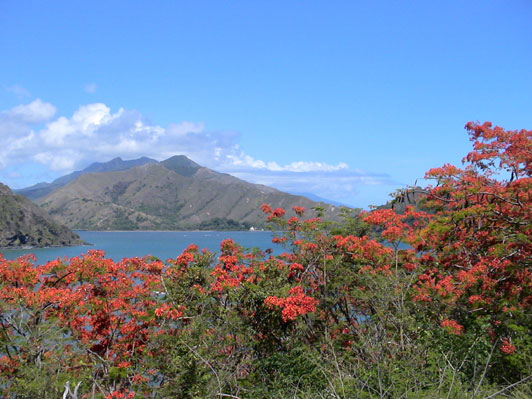

Highest point
- Elevation: 1,628 m (5,341 ft)
- Prominence: 1,628 m (5,341 ft)
- Listing: Ultra; Ribu
- Coordinates: 20°35′18″S 164°46′15″E

Geography
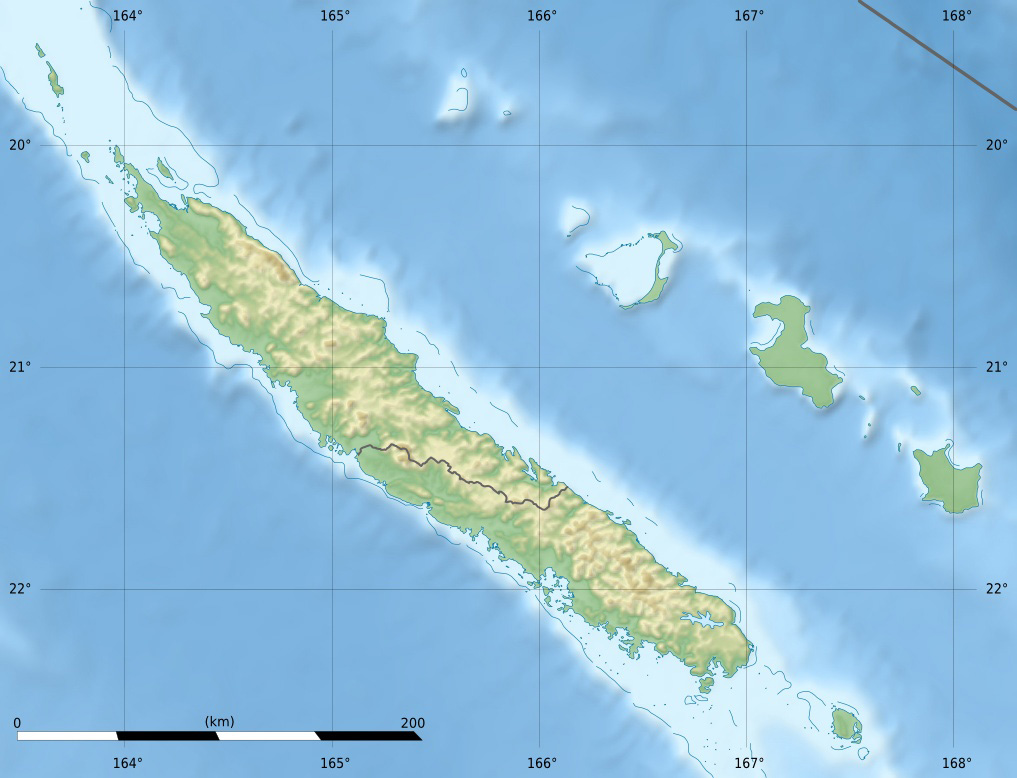
- Location within New Caledonia
- Location: New Caledonia
- Parent range: Chaîne Centrale

Mont Panié is a mountain on the island of Grande Terre in New Caledonia, a special collectivity of France located in the southwest Pacific Ocean. At 1,628 metres (5,341 ft), it is the island's highest point. Mont Panié is situated in the Chaîne Centrale mountain range. The second highest peak on the island, Mount Humboldt, is nearly as tall as Mont Panié, with an elevation of 1,618 metres (5,308 ft).

== Environment ==
The eastern slopes of the mountain descend directly and steeply to the sea. On the western side are the upper valleys of the Diahot and Ulaeeum Rivers. Above 700 m (2,300 ft), the vegetation is dominated by dayu biik forest. Further down, between 700 and 300 m (2,300 and 1,000 ft), there is a transition zone characterised by niaouli, followed by savannas and anthropogenic areas. The mountain's forests are home to 13 species of palms, three of which are endemic to the massif.

Conservation International New Caledonia has worked with provincial authorities and local partners on co-management around the massif, including arrangements involving the Dayu Biik association. Conservation International has also carried out biodiversity assessments in the Mont Panié and Roches de la Ouaième area and supported invasive-mammal control trials on the mountain slopes.

=== Important Bird Area ===
The Panié massif has been recognised as an Important Bird Area (IBA) by BirdLife International because it supports populations of New Caledonian imperial pigeons, cloven-feathered doves, white-bellied goshawks, horned parakeets, grey-eared honeyeaters, crow honeyeaters, New Caledonian friarbirds, New Caledonian myzomelas, barred honeyeaters, fan-tailed gerygones, New Caledonian whistlers, South Melanesian cuckooshrikes, New Caledonian cicadabirds, long-tailed trillers, streaked fantails, Melanesian flycatchers, southern shrikebills, New Caledonian crows, yellow-bellied robins, New Caledonian thicketbirds, green-backed white-eyes, striated starlings and red-throated parrotfinches. There is also a small breeding colony of Tahiti petrels.

== See also ==
- List of ultras of Oceania
- List of islands by highest point
