= Rennell gerygone =

Conservation status
- Least Concern (IUCN 3.1)

Scientific classification
- Kingdom: Animalia
- Phylum: Chordata
- Class: Aves
- Order: Passeriformes
- Family: Acanthizidae
- Genus: Gerygone
- Species: G. citrina

Binomial name
- Gerygone citrina Mayr, 1931

Species of bird

The Rennell gerygone (Gerygone citrina) is a species of bird in the family Acanthizidae. It lives on Rennell Island. It was formerly considered a subspecies of the fan-tailed gerygone (Gerygone flavolateralis), but was split as a distinct species by the International Ornithologists' Union in 2021.

Its natural habitat is subtropical or tropical moist montane forests.
