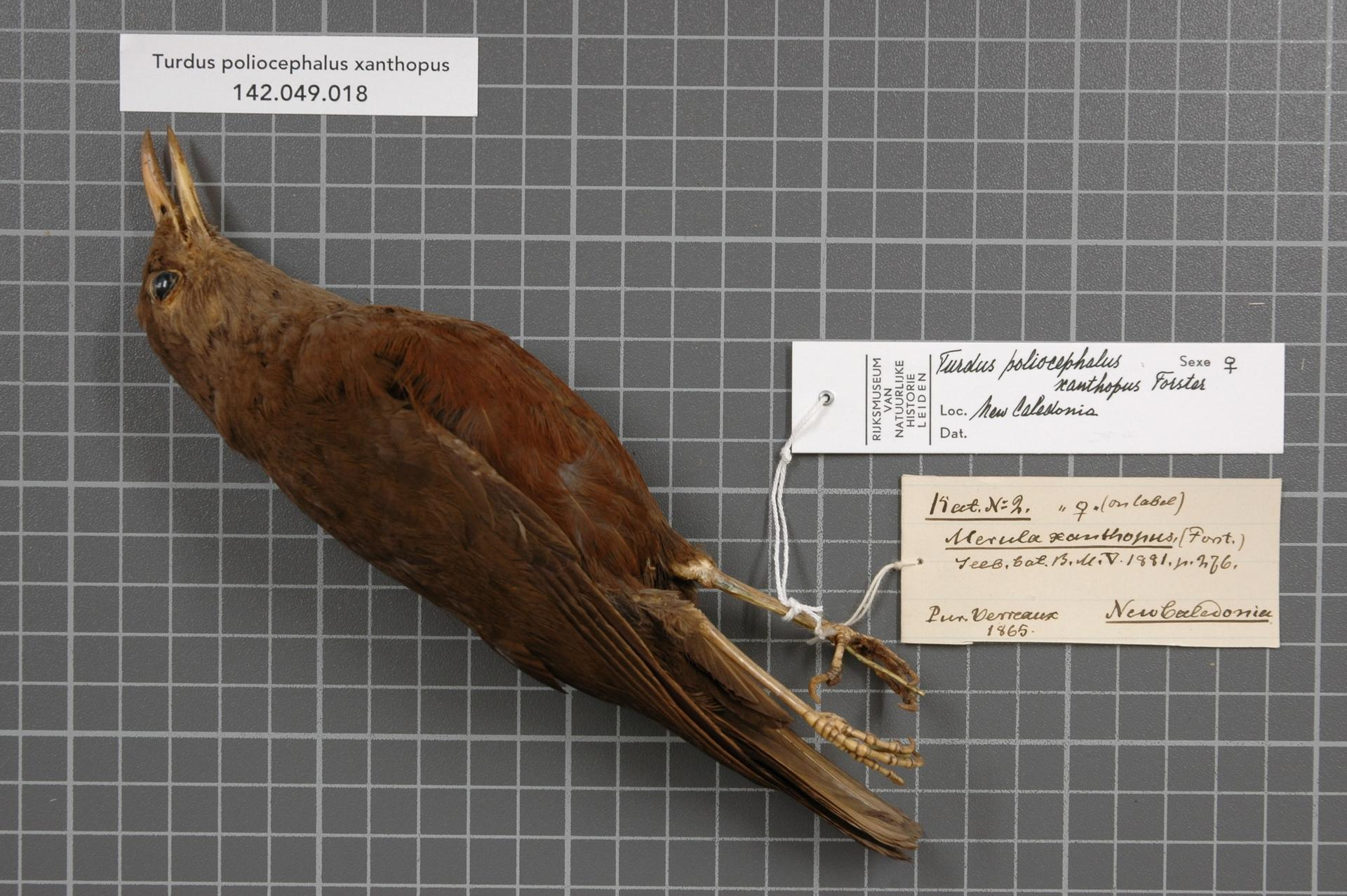

Scientific classification
- Kingdom: Animalia
- Phylum: Chordata
- Class: Aves
- Order: Passeriformes
- Family: Turdidae
- Genus: Turdus
- Species: T. xanthopus

Binomial name
- Turdus xanthopus Forster, 1844

= New Caledonian island thrush =

Species of bird

The New Caledonian island thrush (Turdus xanthopus) is a species of passerine bird in the thrush family Turdidae. It is endemic to New Caledonia, it was thought extinct until it was discovered on the islands of Néba and Yandé in 1978. It was formerly considered to be a subspecies of the island thrush until 2024 when the island thrush was split into 17 species by the IOC and Clements checklist.

== Taxonomy ==
The New Caledonian island thrush was first described in 1894 as Turdus xanthopus by German naturalist Johann Reinhold Forster. It was later classified as a subspecies of the island thrush under the name T. p. xanthopus. Following a 2023 phylogenetic study of the island thrush subspecies, as well as with consideration to morphological differences, the island thrush was split into 17 species. The New Caledonian island thrush is monotypic.

== Description ==
The New Caledonian island thrush is a medium-sized bird with very little sexual dimorphism, with females weighing slightly more than males. Adults are brown overall, with a dark crown and back and a slightly rufous belly. It has a yellow bill and eye-ring and brownish-yellow legs. The fledgling plumage is said to resemble the adults but with a blackish bill and faintly spotted underparts.

== Behaviour ==
The New Caledonian island thrush is known to forage both on the ground and in trees, with its diet being mainly composed of invertebrates and fruit. Invertebrates are found through discarding leaf litter on the ground using its bill, while fruit are usually plucked from trees and swallowed whole. Large fruit seeds are regurgitated. Its nest is woven and basket-shaped.

== Distribution and habitat ==
The New Caledonian island thrush used to have a large distribution in New Caledonia on Grande Terre, where it was mainly found in dry forests, particularly on the west coast of the island. The last confirmed sighting of the bird on Grande Terre was in 1928 and it was considered extinct until being rediscovered on the islands of Yandé and Néba in 1978. Both islands are small with Yandé being around 13 square kilometres (5.0 mi^{2}) in size, and Néba being 3.5 square kilometres (1.4 mi^{2}). The New Caledonian island thrush has been found to prefer coastal forests.

== Conservation ==
Due to being considered a subspecies prior to 2024, the New Caledonian island thrush has not been evaluated by the IUCN yet. But owing to its small current distribution and significant loss of historical range – formerly being found on Grande Terre before being extirpated – along with its small population size and vulnerability, it is very likely to be endangered. Following its rediscovery on Yandé, the population was estimated to be around 100 individuals, however in 2009 only 60 individuals were recorded in a census. A census on the island of Néba from 2015 to 2016 had an estimate of less than 75 individuals. Current threats also include the degradation of its preferred habitat, as well as the risk of Black rat or New Caledonian crow being introduced to the islands, additionally both Pacific rat and feral cats are found on both islands. In 2019 the estimated suitable habitat on the islands was 153 hectares (380 acres) on Yandé, and 42.7 hectares (106 acres) on Néba.
