= Conservation International New Caledonia =

Programme of Conservation International in New Caledonia

- Conservation International Nouvelle-Calédonie
- Abbreviation: CI New Caledonia
- Formation: 2002 (local office established)
- Type: Programme
- Headquarters: Nouméa, New Caledonia
- Region served: New Caledonia
- Fields: Biodiversity conservation; marine conservation; protected areas; sustainable fisheries; invasive species management
- Parent organization: Conservation International
- Website: www.conservation.org

Conservation International New Caledonia (French: Conservation International Nouvelle-Calédonie) is the New Caledonia programme of Conservation International.

It works on terrestrial and marine conservation in New Caledonia, with major strands centered on co-management around the Mont Panié massif in North Province, marine conservation linked to the Natural Park of the Coral Sea, sustainable fisheries initiatives, and nature-based restoration work in Morari Bay.

Historic and current work has also included biodiversity assessment and research in Province Nord and, in the 2020s, wildfire-risk mitigation plantings on Grande Terre, nature-based sediment-management trials in Morari Bay, and participation in a jurisdictional approach initiative for longline tuna fisheries.

== Overview ==
The programme is based in Nouméa. Its geographic structure combines a long-running terrestrial focus in North Province, marine work tied to the Natural Park of the Coral Sea and offshore tuna fisheries, and smaller strands in Mont-Dore and the Loyalty Islands.

Its thematic work has included co-management of protected areas, biodiversity assessment and research, marine conservation and sustainable fisheries, invasive-species control, and nature-based restoration.

== History ==
Conservation International began partnerships with the North Province in 1996 and established a local office in 2002.

Work around Mont Panié then developed into a co-management project initiated in 2003 and early invasive-mammal control trials in 2004.

In 2007, Conservation International's Marine Rapid Assessment Program surveyed the north-west lagoon between Koumac and Yandé. The Rapid Assessment Program expedition for the Mont Panié / Roches de la Ouaième region was published in 2013, reflecting the programme's role in biodiversity baseline-setting in Province Nord.

The Natural Park of the Coral Sea was created in 2014.

In February 2019, the Government of New Caledonia and Conservation International Foundation renewed a five-year framework agreement first signed in 2012, with objectives linked to the Natural Park, sustainable fisheries, research and innovation partnerships, and regional and international outreach.

Jurisdictional initiatives linked to longline tuna fisheries were launched in 2021, and a second phase launched in 2024.

== Programmes and operations ==
Selected programme locations mentioned in the article (1 Nouméa; 2 Mont Panié–Thönyë; 3 north-west lagoon (Koumac–Yandé); 4 Mont-Dore (Morari Bay); 5 Loyalty Islands; 6 Natural Park of the Coral Sea)

=== National ===
At territory-wide level, the 2019 framework agreement between Conservation International Foundation and the Government of New Caledonia set cooperation objectives that included support for the Natural Park of the Coral Sea (including technical and strategic support for park actors), work on sustainable fishing and tourism, and links with partner universities for applied research, innovation, and training. In 2023, Conservation International supported plantings of sea hibiscus (Hibiscus tiliaceus) as living firebreaks on parts of Grande Terre, intended to slow wildfire spread in some conditions.

=== Mont Panié / Thönyë and Province Nord ===
In Province Nord, Conservation International's terrestrial work has centred on co-management of the Mont Panié massif with provincial authorities and the Dayu Biik association. Activities have included biodiversity inventories and field assessments, invasive-species management, and local participation linked to stewardship and ecotourism. Community-based invasive-species work around Mont Panié included intensive trapping of rats and feral cats in a 100-hectare trial area at Thoven and efforts to reduce feral pig impacts on gardens on the mountain's flanks.

Dayu Biik was created in 2004 with support from Conservation International and Province Nord and is run by members of the local community. It develops a participatory conservation programme for the Mont Panié wild nature reserve intended to preserve biodiversity while supporting activities linked to conservation, environmental education and ecotourism. Province Nord later formalized its partnership with Dayu Biik in 2009; the first management plan covered 2012–2016. In 2022 the protected area was expanded and renamed Thönyë, increasing its area from 5,490 hectares to 10,918 hectares.

=== North-west lagoon (Koumac–Yandé) ===
As part of its marine biodiversity assessment and baseline-setting work in Province Nord, Conservation International's Marine Rapid Assessment Program surveyed the coral reefs of the north-west lagoon between Koumac and Yandé. The assessment covered coral and reef-fish diversity, selected marine invertebrates, targeted fish stocks, reef condition, and socioeconomic issues related to marine resource use, and was intended to support marine-management decision-making.

=== Province Sud ===
In Mont-Dore (Morari Bay), Conservation International is leading an experimental sediment-trap project supported through Nature 2050. The semi-permeable bamboo and branch structures are intended to retain sediment, encourage mangrove expansion, and help protect seagrass beds and coral reefs in the bay. The pilot project has involved the commune of Mont-Dore, Province Sud, the Drubea-Kapumë customary council, and local associations including Caledoclean, SOS Mangrove and Red Ground.

=== Natural Park of the Coral Sea and sustainable fisheries ===
The Natural Park of the Coral Sea was created in 2014 and covers about 1.3 million km^{2} across the exclusive economic zone of New Caledonia. This marine role was reinforced in the 2019 framework agreement between the Government of New Caledonia and Conservation International Foundation, which included support for the park among its cooperation objectives alongside sustainable fisheries, research and innovation partnerships.

In 2023, New Caledonia expanded the park's reserve network by 105,000 km^{2}, increasing the share of the park under strong protection from 2.4 per cent to 10 per cent. Government material described the reform as the outcome of scientific work and consultation involving institutions, customary representatives, socio-professional actors and civil-society representatives; the public consultation received 448 responses, 71.1 per cent of them favourable. External reporting stated that Conservation International scientists worked with the government and local stakeholders, including representatives of the fishing industry, to identify priority ecological areas and marine corridors between new and existing or planned reserves.

Conservation International launched place-based jurisdictional initiatives for albacore tuna in Fiji and New Caledonia in 2021 with support from the Walmart Foundation. Five-year memoranda of understanding with New Caledonia’s Fédération des Pêcheurs Hauturiers and Association des Industriels de Transformation des Produits Hauturiers were signed in December 2022 as part of an approach intended to improve the environmental, social and economic performance of the domestic longline tuna fishery. According to industry representatives, the initiative was intended to cover all tuna fisheries operating within New Caledonia’s exclusive economic zone. Phase 2 launched in 2024; in New Caledonia it included support for the implementation of new marine protected areas and work with private-sector partners on human and labour-rights improvements, within a broader Pacific initiative that also addressed issues such as protected-species impacts and fleet monitoring.

=== Loyalty Islands ===
The 2019 framework agreement between the Government of New Caledonia and Conservation International Foundation included support for defining sustainable practices for sandalwood exploitation in the Loyalty Islands. Conservation International also supported, with the Province des Îles Loyauté, a participatory process to complete the management plan for the Ouvéa and Beautemps-Beaupré atolls.

Selected landscapes and marine contexts related to Conservation International New Caledonia
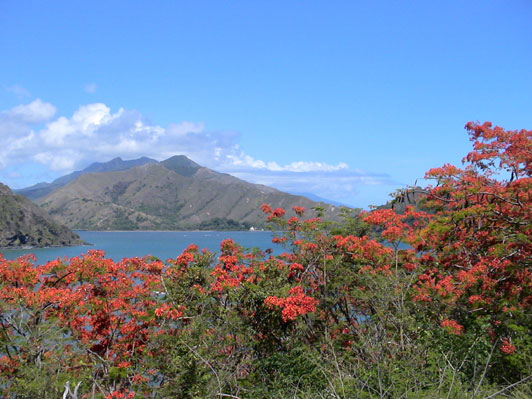
Mont Panié, where CI New Caledonia's terrestrial work has centered on the Mont Panié / Thönyë landscape

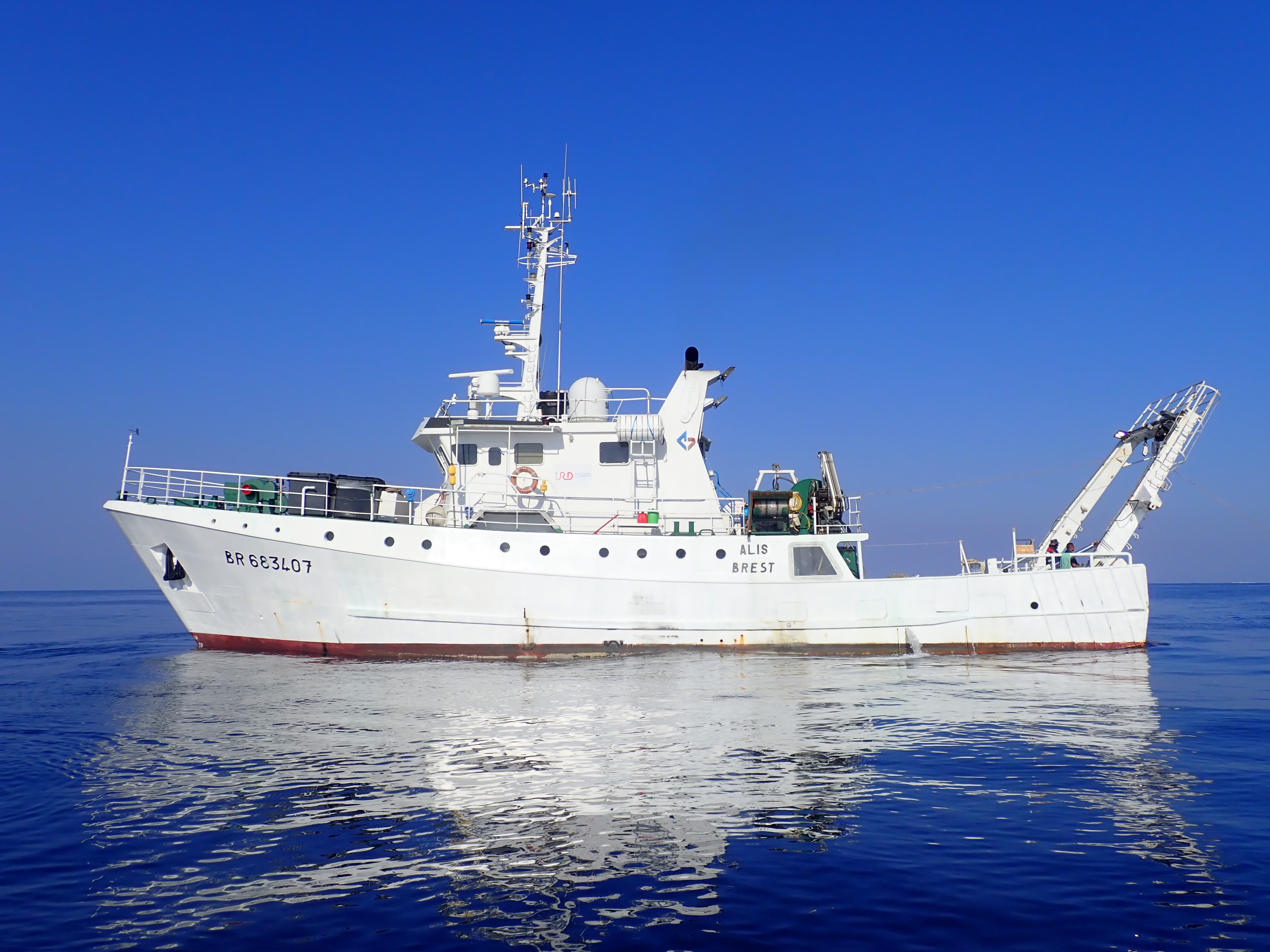
The research vessel L'Alis in the Koumac lagoon, near the north-west lagoon area surveyed by CI's Marine Rapid Assessment Program

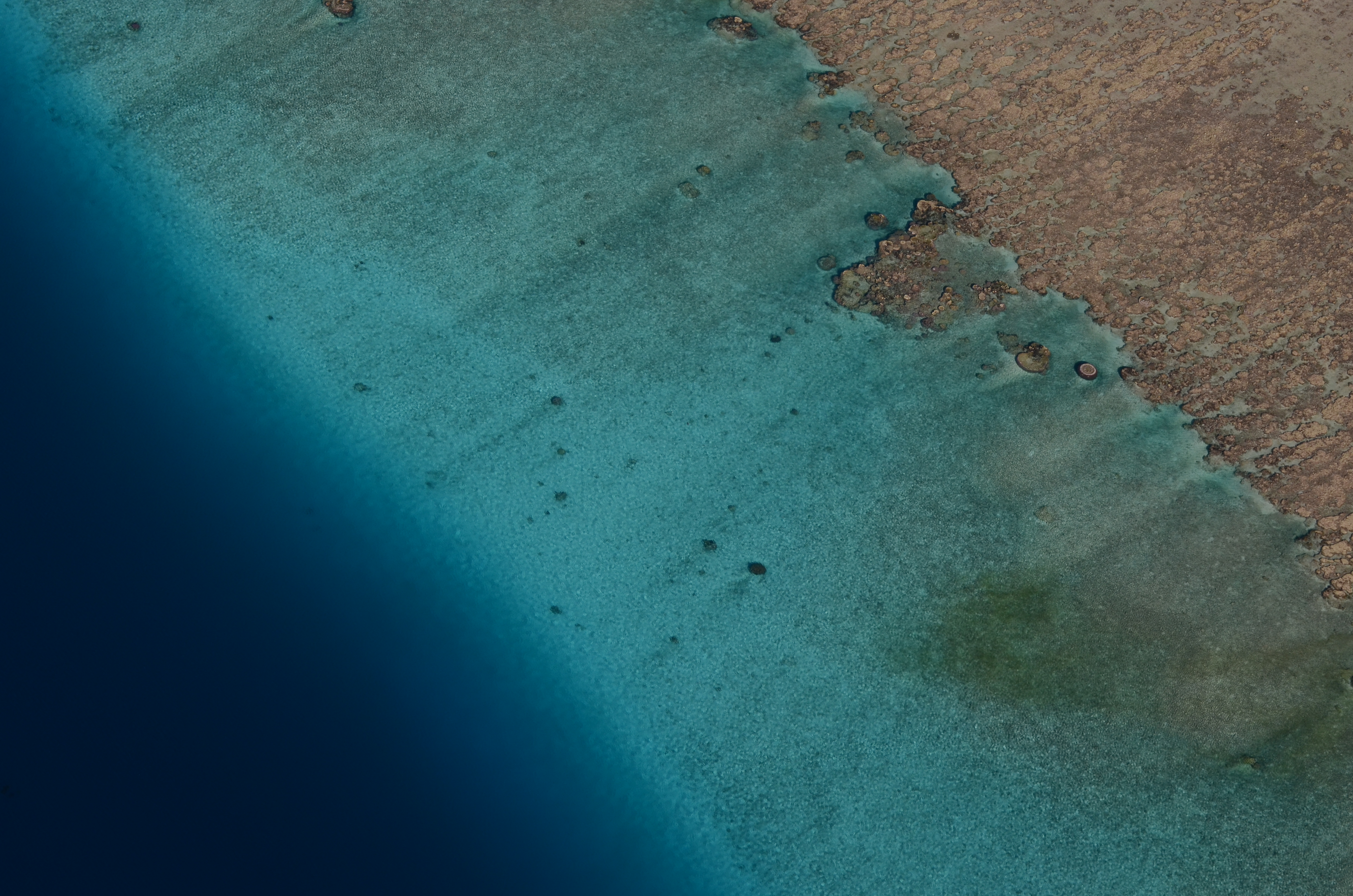
The Great Coral Reef of Gatope in the Natural Park of the Coral Sea

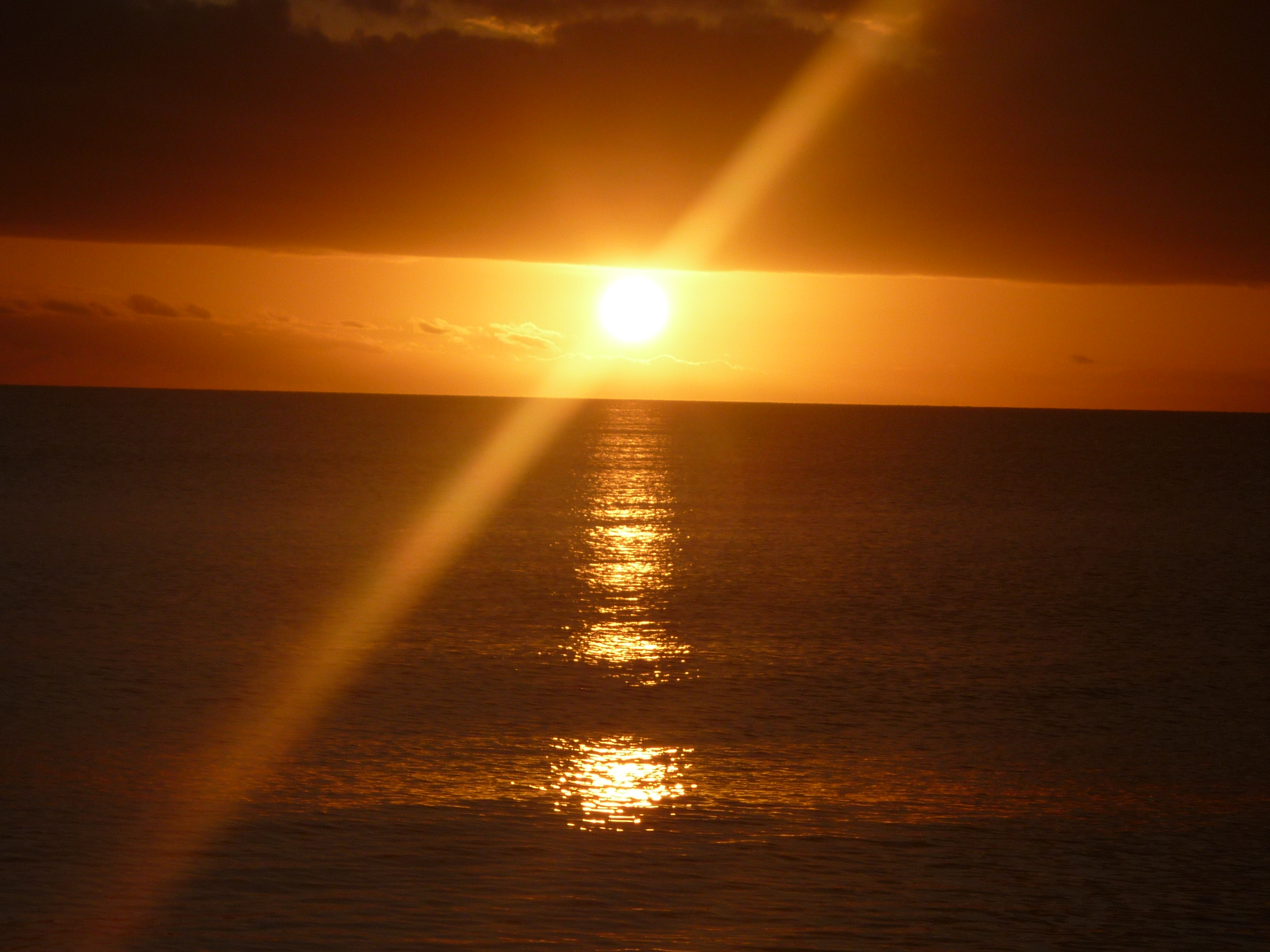
The lagoon of Ouvéa, in the Loyalty Islands

== Partnerships ==
Recurring public and institutional partners in Conservation International New Caledonia's work have included the Government of New Caledonia in territory-wide cooperation on the Natural Park of the Coral Sea, sustainable fisheries, research and innovation; Province Nord in co-management around Mont Panié / Thönyë; Province Sud and the commune of Mont-Dore in Morari Bay restoration work; and the province of the Loyalty Islands in management planning for the Ouvéa and Beautemps-Beaupré atolls.

At community, industry and technical level, recurring partners have included the Dayu Biik association in Mont Panié co-management; the Drubea-Kapumë customary council and local associations such as Caledoclean, SOS Mangrove and Red Ground in the Morari Bay sediment-trap pilot; and longline tuna industry bodies including the Fédération des Pêcheurs Hauturiers and the Association des Industriels de Transformation des Produits Hauturiers in fisheries-improvement initiatives. The 2019 framework agreement also provided for links with partner universities for applied research, innovation and training.

== Funding and conservation finance ==
Funding linked to Conservation International New Caledonia's work has taken the form of provincial subsidies, partner grants, and project-specific support. In Province Nord, a 2008 convention for phase 1 of a biodiversity-conservation programme provided Conservation International with 950,000 F.CFP in operating support and 4,200,000 F.CFP in investment support. The province then granted a further 2,500,000 F.CFP operating subsidy in 2009 and renewed support in 2010 through another 2,500,000 F.CFP subsidy for the biodiversity programme.

Province Nord also supported partner-led biodiversity work around Mont Panié / Thönyë. In 2010, Dayu Biik received 13,000,000 F.CFP in operating support and 1,100,000 F.CFP in investment support for the Mont Panié biodiversity project carried out in cooperation with Conservation International. Related work later received external support through the BEST programmes: the BEST 2.0 project RECOFOR provided €49,999.96 for deer regulation at Mont Panié in 2018-2019, and BEST 2.0+ provided €50,937.49 for Dayu Biik's culture-and-conservation project in New Caledonia.

In Province Sud, the Morari Bay sediment-trap pilot is supported through Nature 2050. In the fisheries strand, the jurisdictional initiatives for albacore tuna launched in New Caledonia in 2021 were backed by the Walmart Foundation.

== Impact and evaluation ==
Published assessment material related to Conservation International New Caledonia's work has mainly taken the form of biodiversity baselines, management recommendations and case-study lessons rather than formal programme evaluations.

In Province Nord, the Rapid Assessment Program volumes for the Mont Panié / Roches de la Ouaième region and for the north-west lagoon between Koumac and Yandé served as baseline knowledge outputs for later conservation planning. The terrestrial volume assembled inventories across plants, birds, herpetofauna, freshwater fishes and crustaceans, odonates, and invasive mammals, while the marine volume presented conservation and management recommendations for issues including sedimentation, stock assessment and long-term reef monitoring.

A 2007 case study on invasive-species management at Mont Panié presented the co-management programme as an example of community-based implementation. It described long-running dialogue with local tribes, the creation of Dayu Biik as a channel for local participation in decision-making, and training for local trappers. In the 100-hectare proof-of-concept area at Thoven, rat-control targets were reported as achieved, supporting confidence that rat and cat control could be expanded, while pig-control work was framed as important both for biodiversity and for reducing damage to tribal gardens and crops.

For the Natural Park of the Coral Sea, the 2023 public consultation on reserve expansion provided a limited indicator of governance feedback. Government reporting stated that the consultation received 448 responses, 71.1 per cent of them favourable, before adoption of measures that increased the share of the park under strong protection to 10 per cent.
