= Natural Park of the Coral Sea =

French marine park, South Pacific Ocean

Coordinates: 21.203°S 165.350°E

- Natural Park of the Coral Sea
- Interactive map of Natural Park of the Coral Sea
- Location: New Caledonia
- Area: 1,292,967 square kilometres (499,217 sq mi)
- Established: 2014; 12 years ago
- Governing body: France

The Natural Park of the Coral Sea (French: Parc naturel de la mer de Corail), established in 2014, is a marine park wholly around New Caledonia, a special collectivity of France. As of 2017 it is the fourth largest protected area in the world, encompassing 1,292,967 square kilometres (499217 sq miles). It includes the UNESCO World Heritage Site The Lagoons of New Caledonia: Reef Diversity and Associated Ecosystems. The possibility granted to the government of New Caledonia to allow cruise ships to circulate there in the future has generated controversy.

== Management and partnerships ==
Conservation International New Caledonia has worked with the Government of New Caledonia on cooperation objectives connected to the park, including technical and strategic support for park actors set out in a five-year framework agreement renewed in 2019. In 2023, Conservation International worked with government and local stakeholders on identifying priority areas and corridors linked to new marine reserves within the park.

== See also ==
- List of largest protected areas in the world
