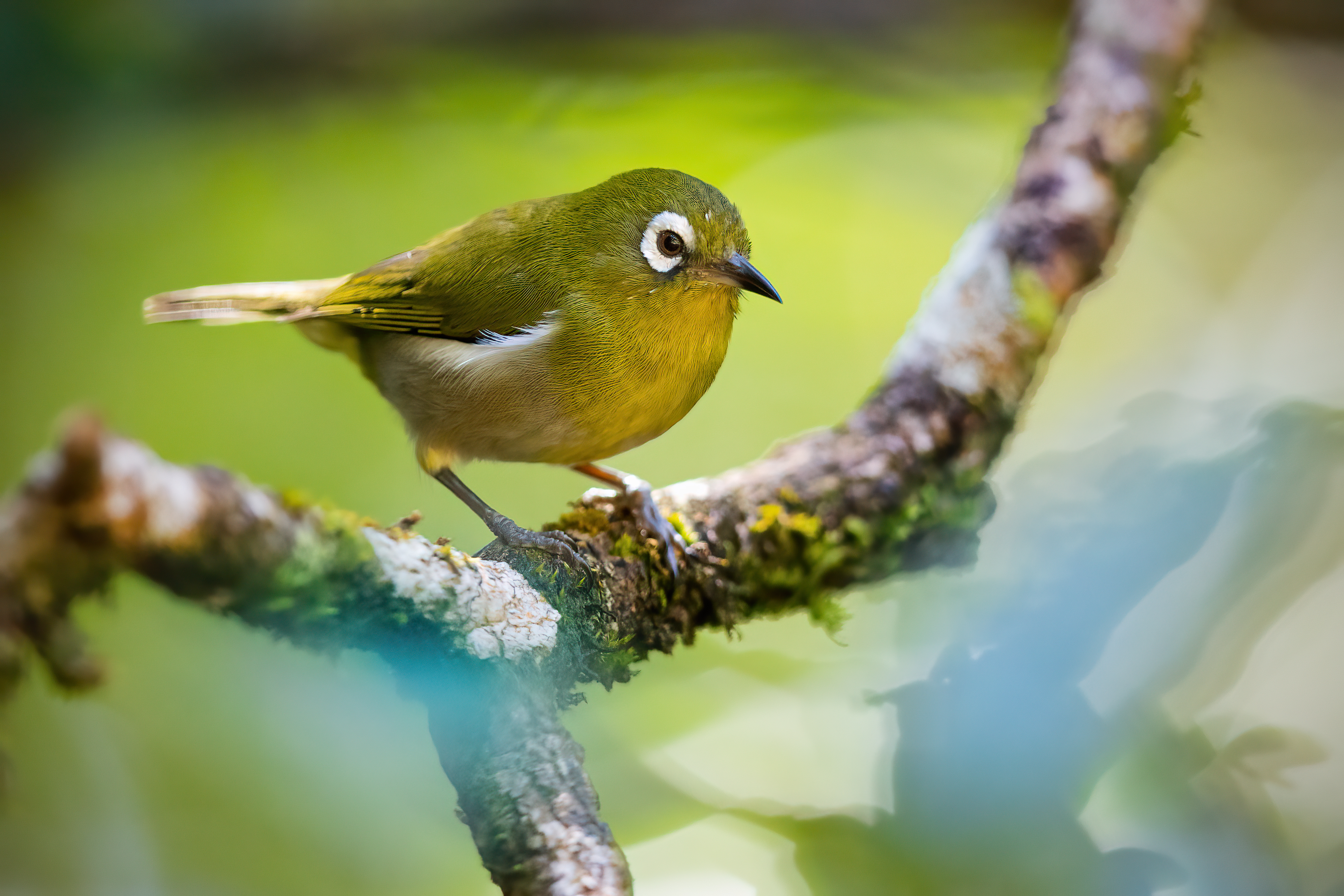

Conservation status
- Least Concern (IUCN 3.1)

Scientific classification
- Kingdom: Animalia
- Phylum: Chordata
- Class: Aves
- Order: Passeriformes
- Family: Zosteropidae
- Genus: Zosterops
- Species: Z. xanthochroa

Binomial name
- Zosterops xanthochroa G.R. Gray, 1859

= Green-backed white-eye =

Species of bird

The green-backed white-eye (Zosterops xanthochroa) is a species of bird in the family Zosteropidae. It is also known as the New Caledonian white-eye. It is endemic to New Caledonia.

== Taxonomy ==
The green-backed white-eye was described by George Robert Gray in 1858 from a specimen collected in Nu. The relationships between this species and other white-eyes are uncertain, but it may form a superspecies with the small Lifou white-eye, also from New Caledonia, the Fiji white-eye and the yellow-fronted white-eye (from Vanuatu). This speculative proposal is based upon the shared yellow underparts and their living in the same general region.

== Distribution and habitat ==
The green-backed white-eye is endemic to the islands of New Caledonia, where it is found on Grande Terre, the main island, the smaller L'Île-des-Pins, as well as Maré in the Loyalty Islands. It is replaced on Lifou by the small and large Lifou white-eyes. It is primarily a bird of primary rainforest, from sea level up, although it becomes rare above 1,000 metres (3,300 ft). It will also enter native gardens and open glades, as well as more open areas opportunistically in order to reach ripening fruit and berries. In the more open brush and woodland habitats it is generally replaced by the related silvereye.

Although the green-backed white-eye has a tiny global range, it is common in its range, especially in the south of Grande Terre and the island of Maré. The species is thought to be decreasing in numbers, due to habitat loss and habitat fragmentation, but not at a rate sufficient to be evaluated as vulnerable. It is therefore listed as least concern by the IUCN. In a study of cave fossils this species and the silvereye are the most commonly found fossil remains.

== Description ==
The green-backed white-eye is 11.5–12.5 centimetres (4.5–4.9 in) in length and weighs around 8.5–12 grams (0.30–0.42 oz). The head and back are dark olive green with a wide white eye-ring and black lores (which breaks the eye-ring at the front), the throat and breast are yellow and the undersides are dirty white. The wings are brown and olive green. The bill is slate coloured with white at the base of the lower mandible, and the legs are pale slate coloured as well. Both sexes are alike, but the plumage of juvenile birds has not been described.

== Behaviour and ecology ==
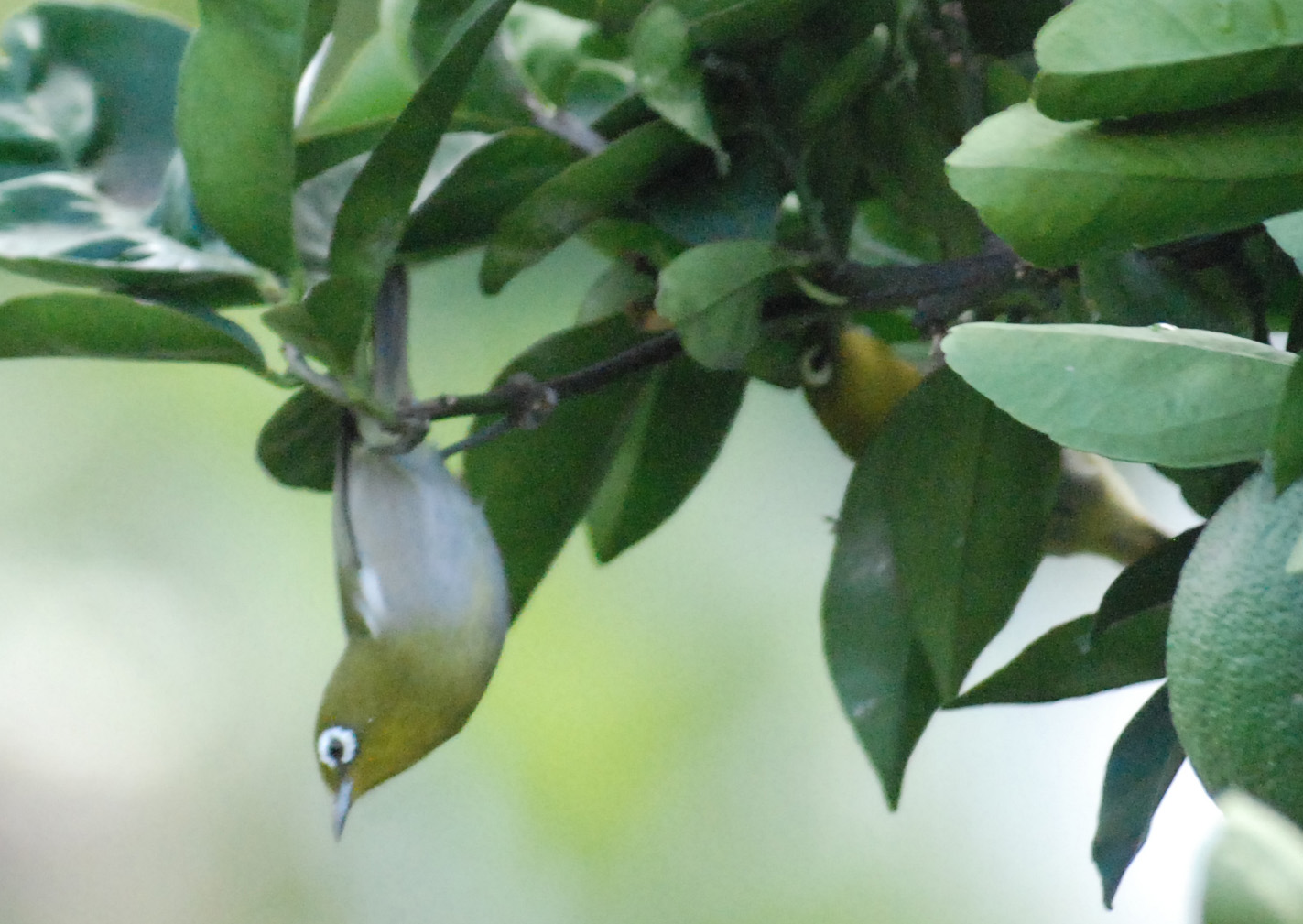
Two green-backed white-eyes foraging

Green-backed white-eyes feed on a variety of fruits and insects. Among the fruits taken are papaya and the berries of the introduced Lantana. They will form feeding flocks after the breeding season, which may increase in size as the months pass. Such flocks will also venture outside the primary rainforests in order to take seasonally variable food sources, and will form mixed species feeding flocks with silvereyes, fan-tailed gerygones, and red-throated parrotfinches. They are themselves preyed upon by barn owls.

The main breeding season for this species is from August to October, but there is considerable uncertainty about the exact timing and it is possible the season extends to January or that the species double broods. The species builds a nest of rootlets, hair, feathers, and cobwebs in the fork of a branch of a tree or shrub. Between two and four turquoise eggs are laid, measuring 16.5 by 13 mm.
