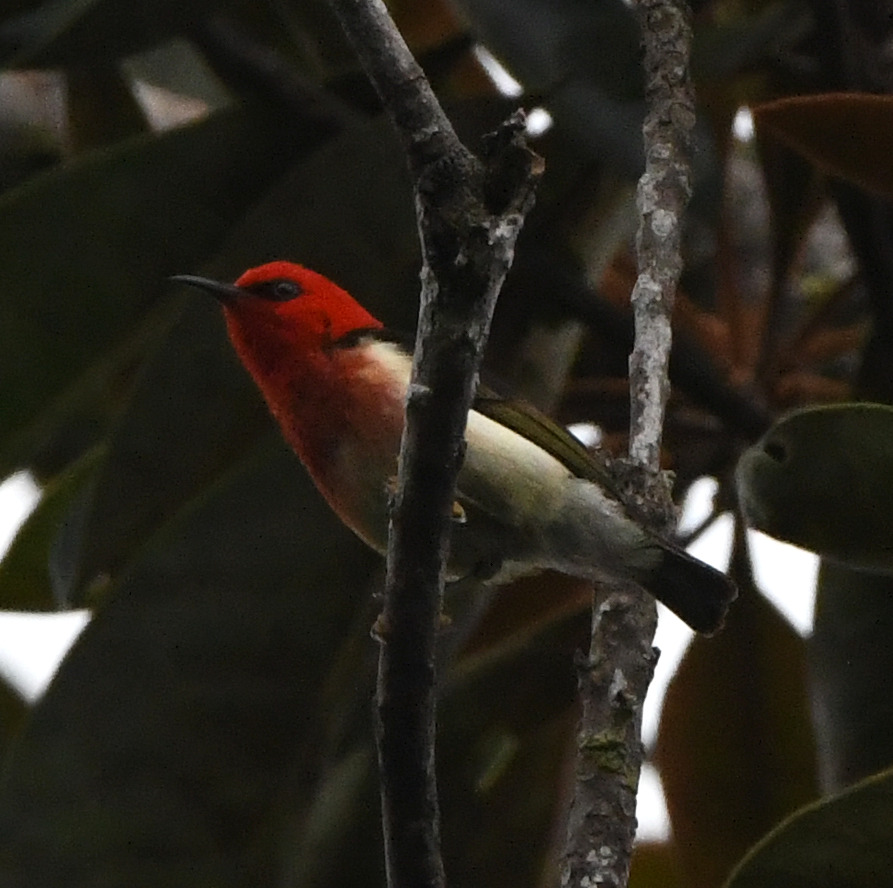

Conservation status
- Least Concern (IUCN 3.1)

Scientific classification
- Kingdom: Animalia
- Phylum: Chordata
- Class: Aves
- Order: Passeriformes
- Family: Meliphagidae
- Genus: Myzomela
- Species: M. caledonica

Binomial name
- Myzomela caledonica Forbes, WA, 1879

= New Caledonian myzomela =

Species of bird

The New Caledonian myzomela (Myzomela caledonica) is a species of bird in the honeyeater family Meliphagidae. The species is sometimes considered to be the same species as the scarlet myzomela of Australia.

== Description ==
The species is around 11 cm in length and typically weighs 6.5 to 8 grams. The males are slightly heavier than the females. The plumage of this species varies by sex, with the male having a scarlet head, breast and back, black wings and tail and a white belly and rump. The female has a dull brown head, breast and back with a slight red wash on the face, and duller wings and belly. Juvenile birds resemble the female.

Compared to the similar scarlet myzomela, adult male New Caledonian myzomelas have cleaner white bellies with less of a grey wash. The white edges to the wing coverts of the latter are also absent in this species. Female New Caledonian myzomelas can be separated from scarlet myzomelas by the stronger red hue on their throat.

== Distribution and conservation ==
The New Caledonian myzomela is endemic to New Caledonia, where it occurs on the island of Grande Terre and the Isle of Pines. In New Caledonia its natural habitat is humid rainforest, stunted hill forest and savanna woodland. It has also moved into modified habitat such as plantations and gardens.

Despite its restricted range, the species is common where it occurs and is consequently considered to be of least concern by the IUCN Red List.

== Biology ==
Breeding takes place between November and January, when these myzomelas make small cup-nests, 4.5–5 cm (1.8–2.0 in) across internally, out of roots and plant fibres. Nests are placed high up in trees and joined to the tree with the help of spider webs. Females lay two eggs, which are incubated by both parents. Both parents also help feed young.
