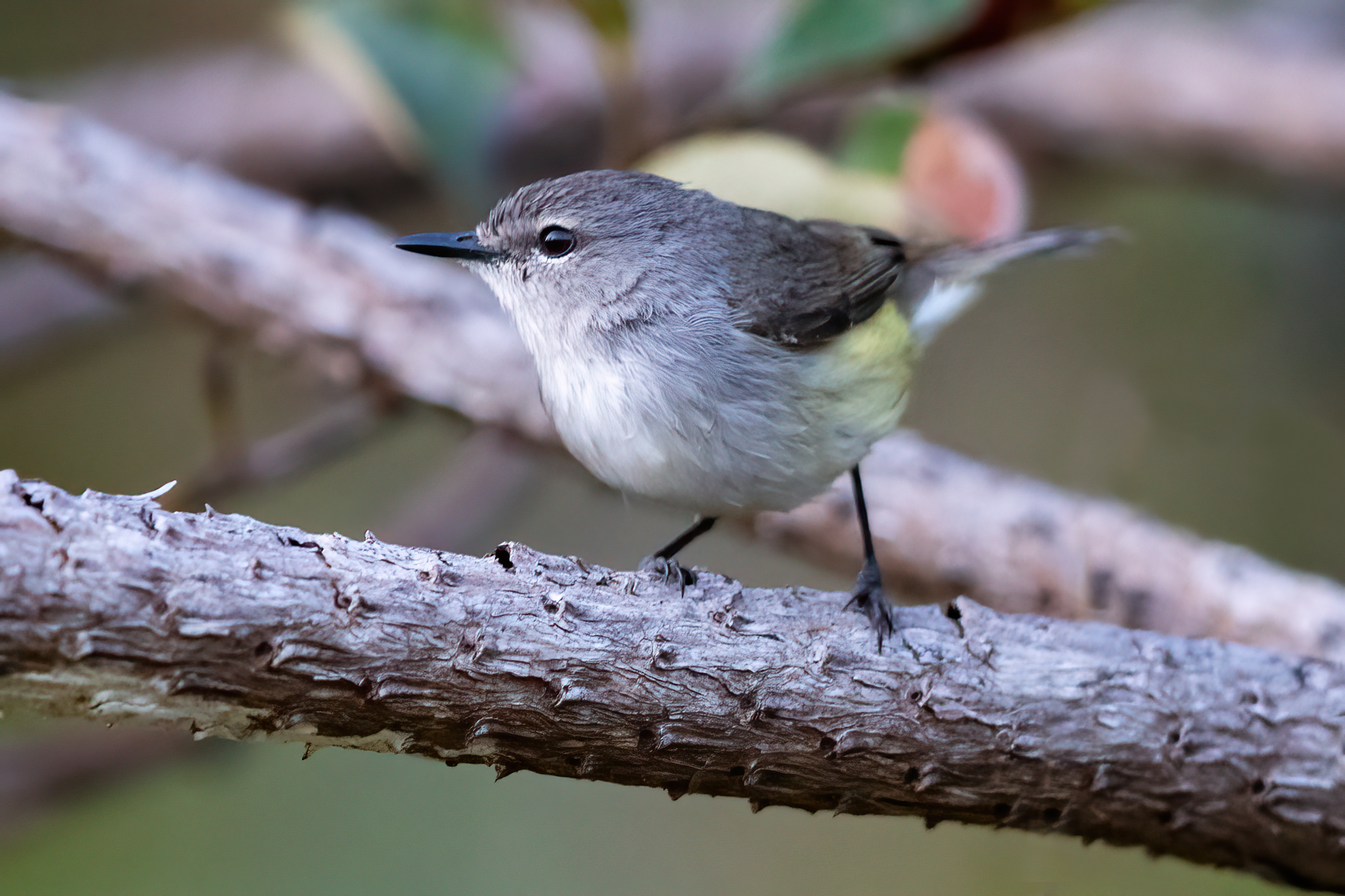

Conservation status
- Least Concern (IUCN 3.1)

Scientific classification
- Kingdom: Animalia
- Phylum: Chordata
- Class: Aves
- Order: Passeriformes
- Family: Acanthizidae
- Genus: Gerygone
- Species: G. flavolateralis

Binomial name
- Gerygone flavolateralis (Gray, GR, 1859)

Subspecies
- G. f. flavolateralis - (Gray, GR, 1859); G. f. lifuensis - (Sarasin, 1913); G. f. rouxi - (Sarasin, 1913); G. f. correiae - Mayr, 1931; G. f. citrina - Mayr, 1931
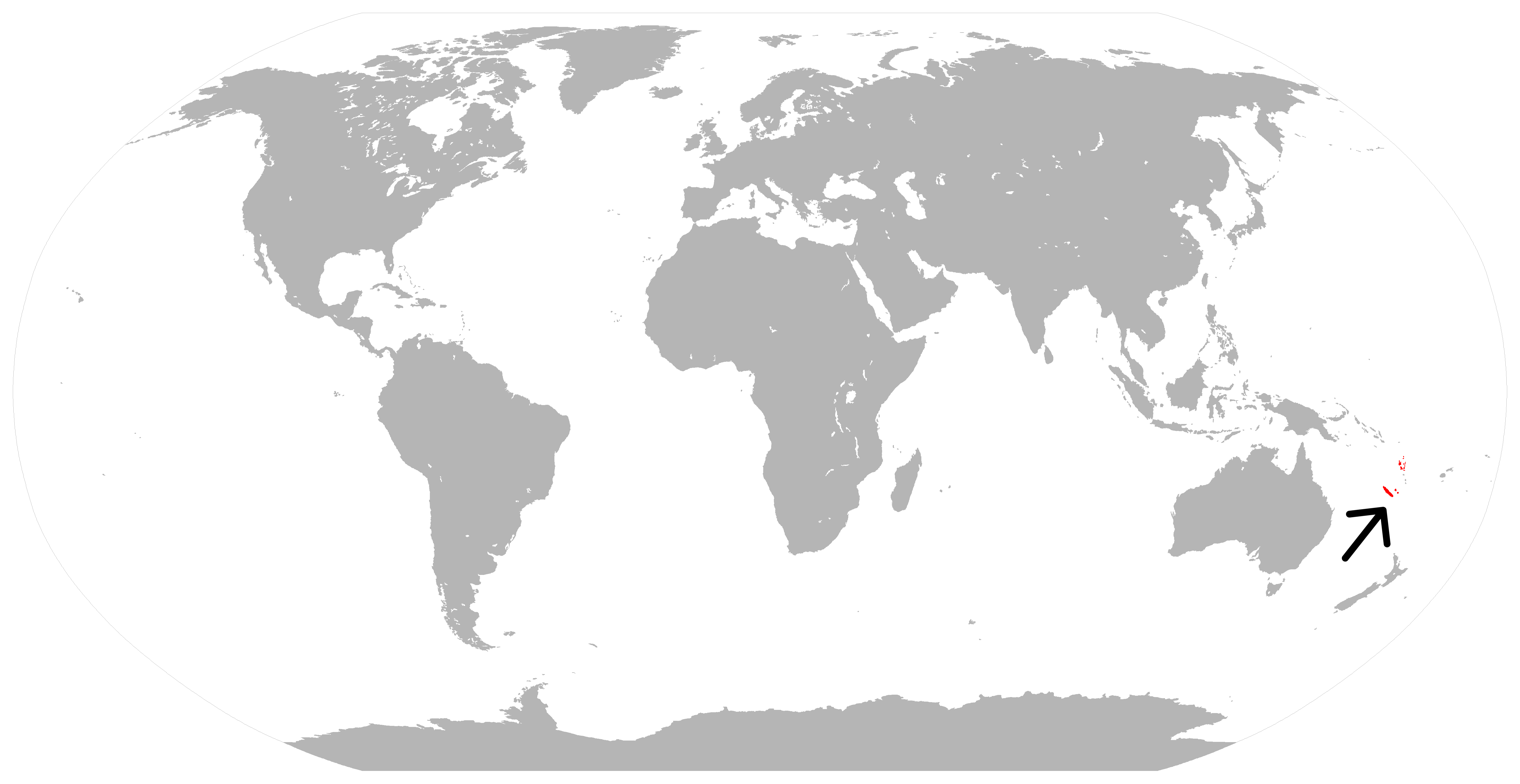

= Fan-tailed gerygone =

Species of bird

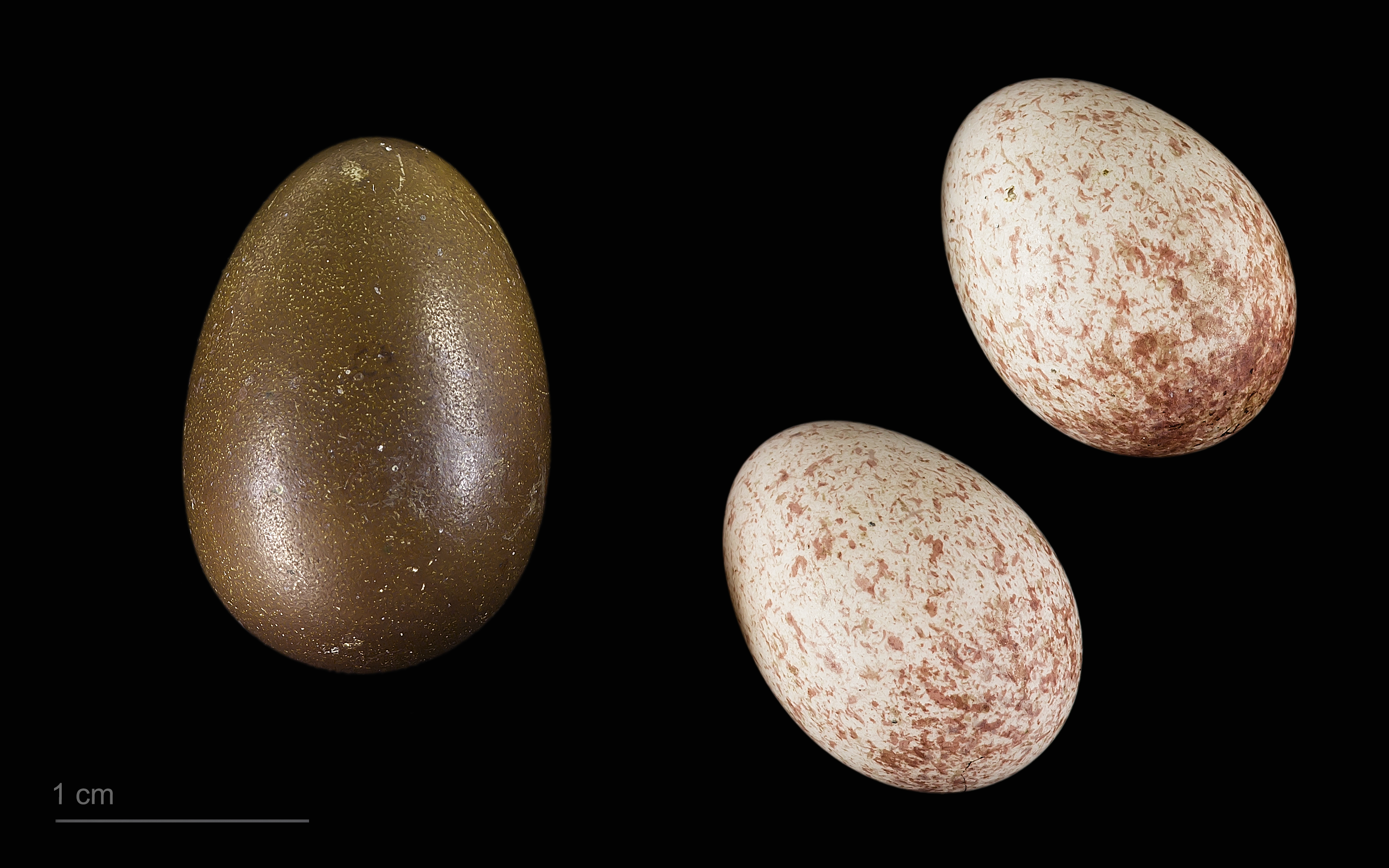
Chrysococcyx lucidus in a spawn of Gerygone flavolateralis - MHNT

The fan-tailed gerygone (Gerygone flavolateralis) is a species of bird in the family Acanthizidae. It is found in New Caledonia and Vanuatu. The Rennell gerygone (G. citrina) of the Solomon Islands was formerly considered conspecific, but was split as a distinct species by the IOC in 2021.
