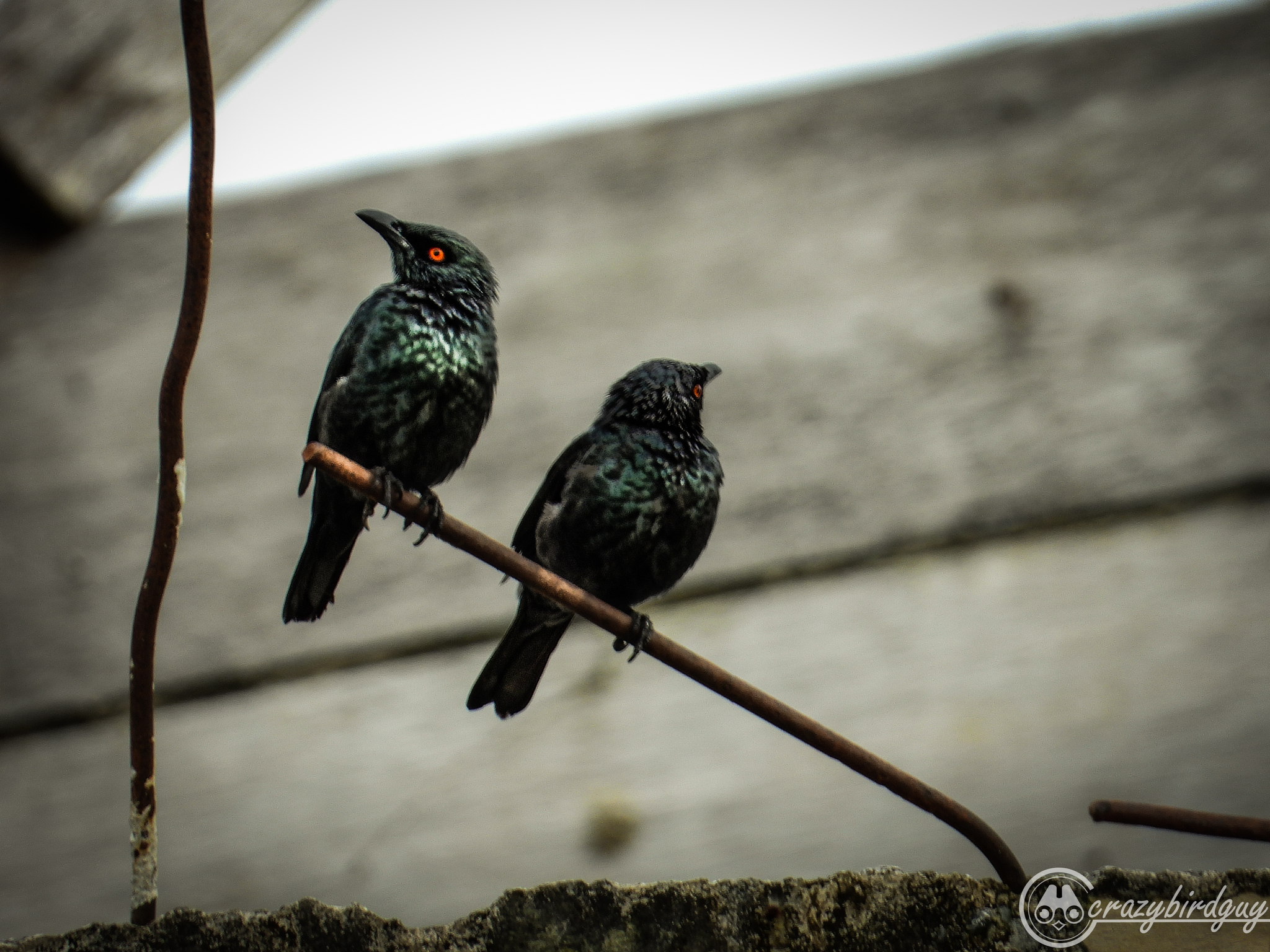

Conservation status
- Least Concern (IUCN 3.1)

Scientific classification
- Kingdom: Animalia
- Phylum: Chordata
- Class: Aves
- Order: Passeriformes
- Family: Sturnidae
- Genus: Aplonis
- Species: A. cantoroides

Binomial name
- Aplonis cantoroides (GR Gray, 1862)

= Singing starling =

Species of bird

The singing starling (Aplonis cantoroides) is a medium-sized (20 cm in length) starling.

== Description ==
Adult singing starlings have glossy black plumage and bright red irises. Immature birds are paler, with streaked underparts and brown irises. They are distinguished from metallic starlings by shorter, square tails and thicker bills.

== Distribution and habitat ==
Singing starlings are found in New Guinea and some adjacent islands, the Bismarck Archipelago, Admiralty Islands and Solomon Islands. They have been recorded from Boigu and Saibai Islands, Queensland, Australian territory in north-western Torres Strait. They inhabit forest edges, gardens and cultivated areas with trees, urban areas and coconut groves.

== Behaviour ==
=== Feeding ===
They eat figs and other soft fruits, and sometimes insects.

=== Breeding ===
They nest in tree-hollows, cliffs and buildings, often colonially, laying 2-3 pale blue eggs.

=== Call ===
The call is a repeated, high-pitched, down-slurred whistle.

== Conservation ==
As a species with a large range and no evidence of population decline, it is assessed as being of Least Concern.
