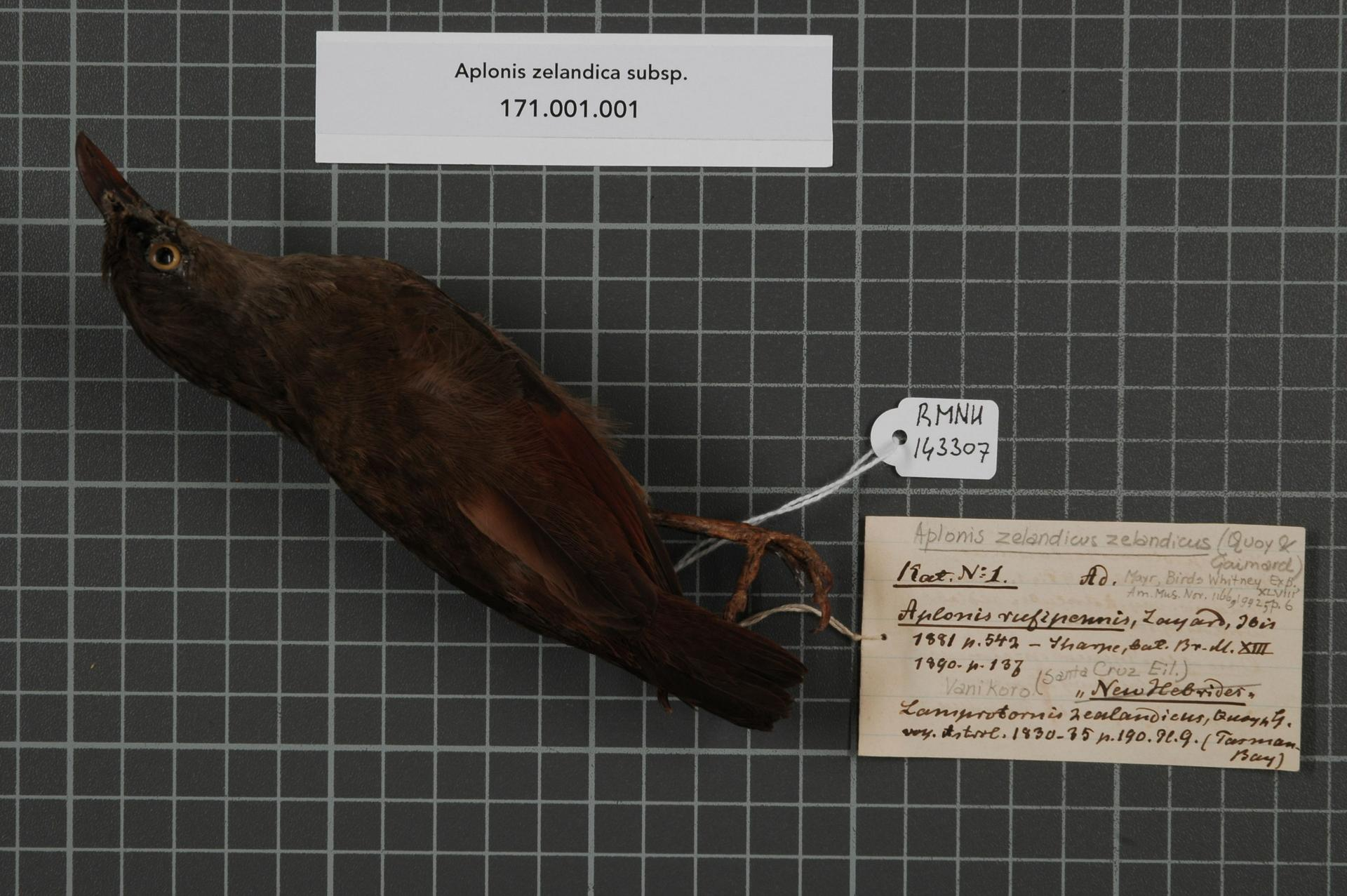

Conservation status
- Least Concern (IUCN 3.1)

Scientific classification
- Kingdom: Animalia
- Phylum: Chordata
- Class: Aves
- Order: Passeriformes
- Family: Sturnidae
- Genus: Aplonis
- Species: A. zelandica

Binomial name
- Aplonis zelandica (Quoy & Gaimard, 1832)

= Rusty-winged starling =

Species of bird

The rusty-winged starling (Aplonis zelandica) is a species of starling in the family Sturnidae. It is found in the Santa Cruz Islands and Vanuatu.

Its natural habitats are subtropical or tropical moist lowland forests and subtropical or tropical moist montane forests. It is threatened by habitat loss arising from the deriving force of human overpopulation.

The rusty-winged starling was described by the French zoologists Jean Quoy and Joseph Gaimard in 1832 from a specimen that they erroneously believed had been obtained from Tasman Bay / Te Tai-o-Aorere in New Zealand. They coined the binomial name, Lamprotornis zelandicus. (Note: Although the ornithological part of the Voyage de la corvette l'Astrolabe has 1830 on the title page it was not published until 1832.) The rusty-winged starling does not occur in New Zealand and the type locality is now designated as Vanikoro in the Solomon Islands.
