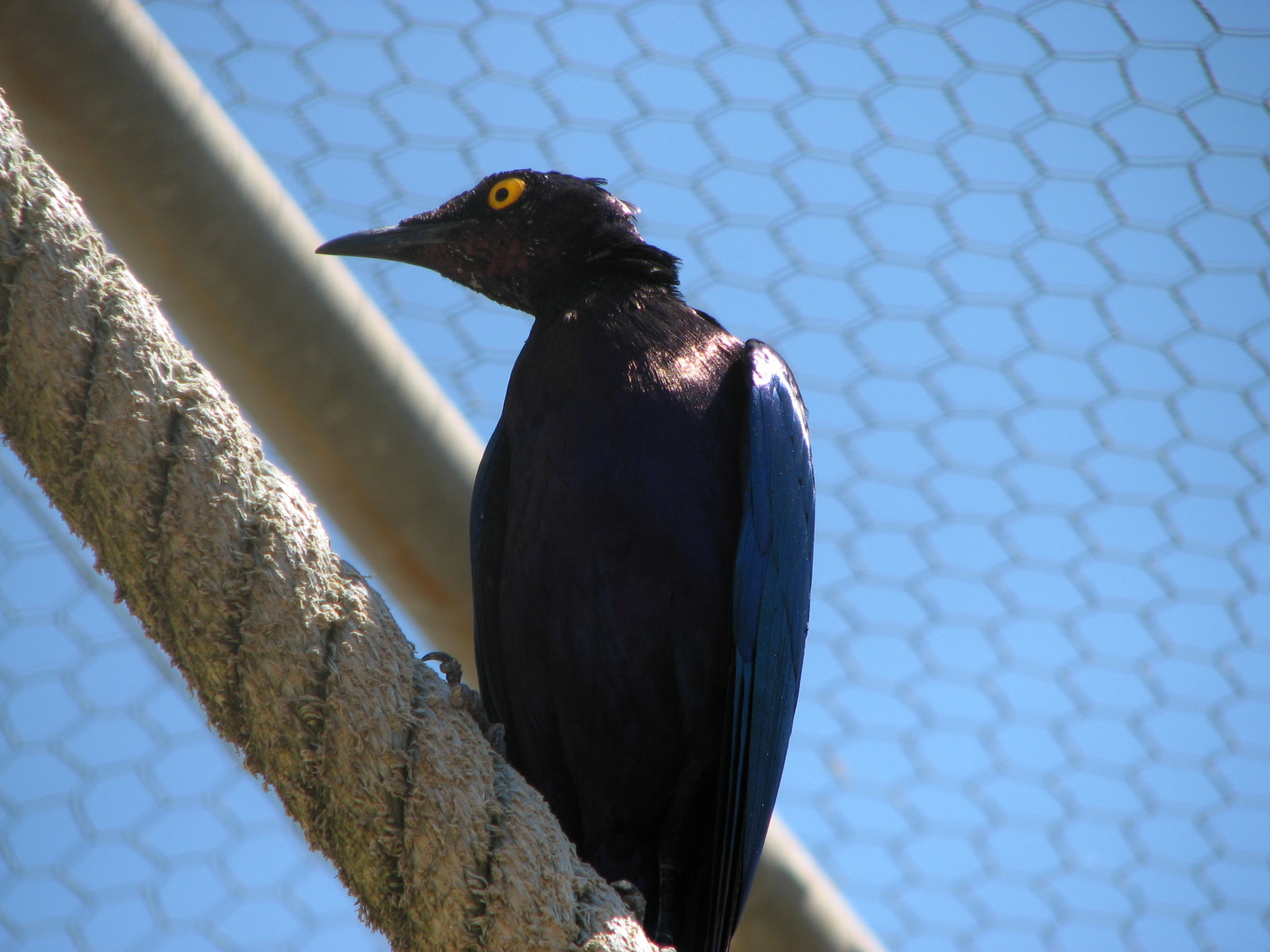

Conservation status
- Near Threatened (IUCN 3.1)

Scientific classification
- Kingdom: Animalia
- Phylum: Chordata
- Class: Aves
- Order: Passeriformes
- Family: Sturnidae
- Genus: Aplonis
- Species: A. mystacea

Binomial name
- Aplonis mystacea (Ogilvie-Grant, 1911)

= Yellow-eyed starling =

Species of bird

The yellow-eyed starling (Aplonis mystacea) is a species of starling in the family Sturnidae. It is found in Indonesia and Papua New Guinea. Its natural habitat is subtropical or tropical moist lowland forests. It is threatened by habitat loss.
