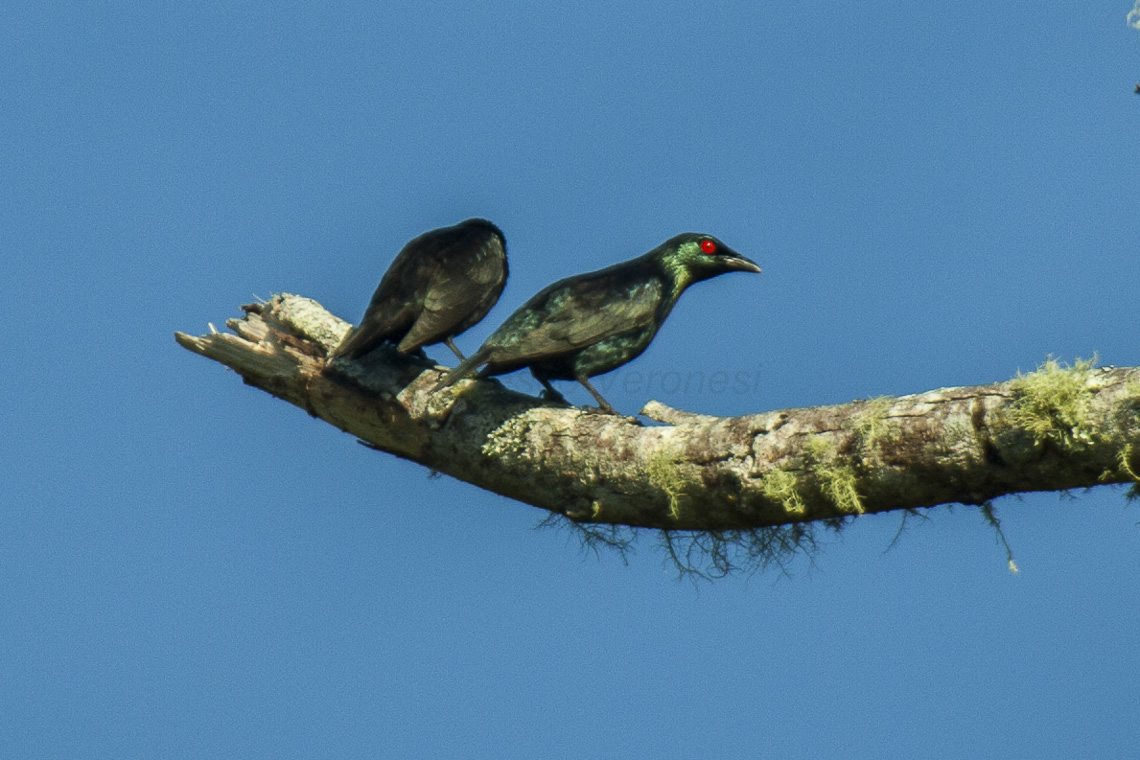
- subspecies todayensis

Conservation status
- Least Concern (IUCN 3.1)

Scientific classification
- Kingdom: Animalia
- Phylum: Chordata
- Class: Aves
- Order: Passeriformes
- Family: Sturnidae
- Genus: Aplonis
- Species: A. minor

Binomial name
- Aplonis minor (Bonaparte, 1850)

= Short-tailed starling =

Species of bird

The short-tailed starling (Aplonis minor) is a species of starling in the family Sturnidae. It is found in Indonesia and the Philippines.

Its natural habitats are subtropical or tropical moist lowland forests and subtropical or tropical moist montane forests.
