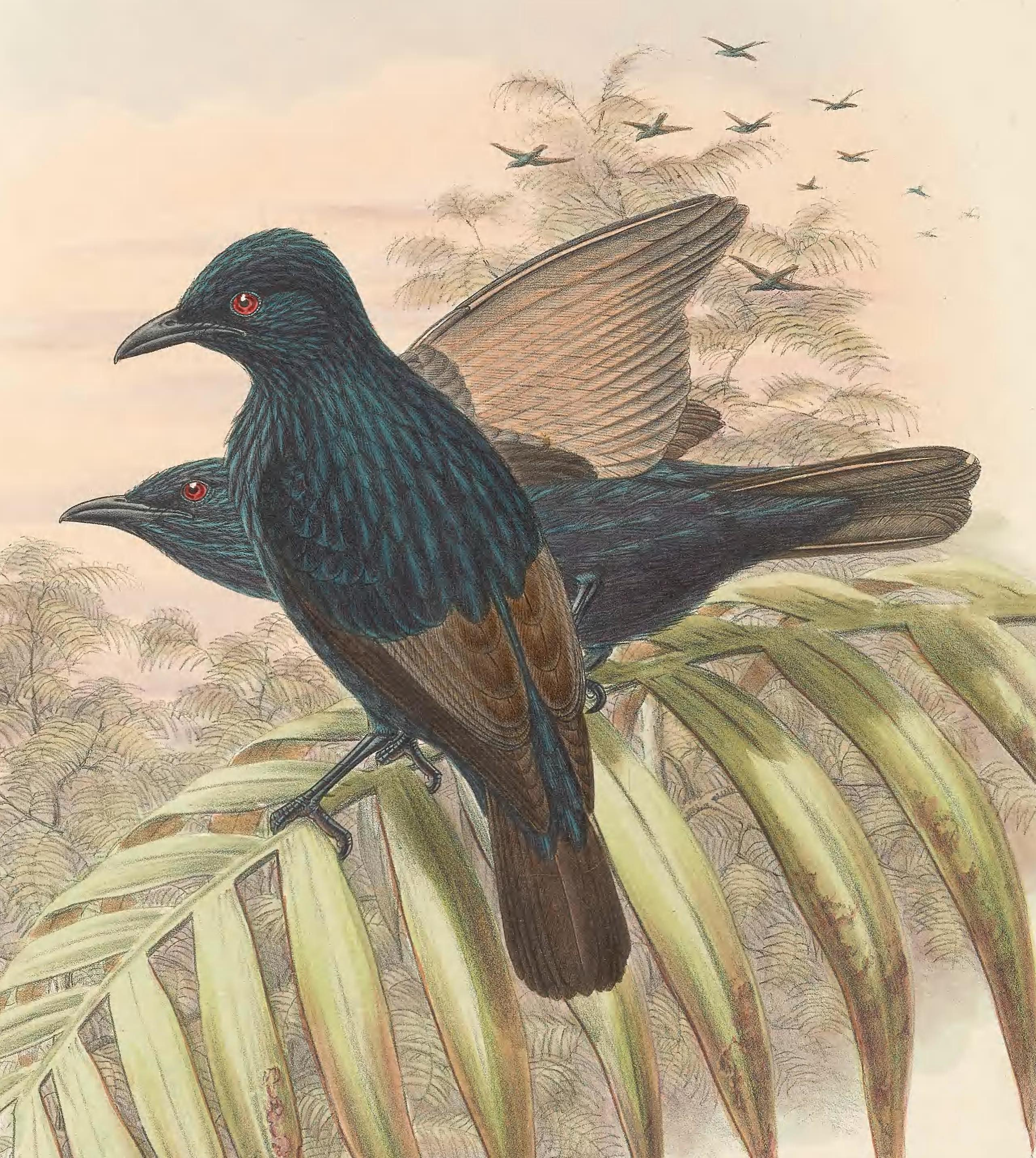
- Illustration by William Matthew Hart

Conservation status
- Least Concern (IUCN 3.1)

Scientific classification
- Kingdom: Animalia
- Phylum: Chordata
- Class: Aves
- Order: Passeriformes
- Family: Sturnidae
- Genus: Aplonis
- Species: A. grandis

Binomial name
- Aplonis grandis (Salvadori, 1881)

= Brown-winged starling =

Species of bird

The brown-winged starling (Aplonis grandis) is a species of starling in the family Sturnidae. It is found in the Solomon Islands archipelago. Its natural habitat is subtropical or tropical moist lowland forests.
