= Martin Davies (writer) =

British author

Martin Davies (born 1965) is a British author. His works include Havana Sleeping (2014), The Year After (2011), The Unicorn Road (2009), The Conjuror's Bird (2005), and a book about Joseph Banks and the Mysterious Bird of Ulieta. He is also the author of six mystery novels about Sherlock Holmes' housekeeper Mrs. Hudson including: Mrs. Hudson and the Spirits' Curse (2004), Mrs. Hudson and the Malabar Rose (2005), and Mrs. Hudson and the Christmas Canary (2022).

In 2015, his espionage thriller Havana Sleeping was shortlisted for the CWA Historical Dagger Award.
