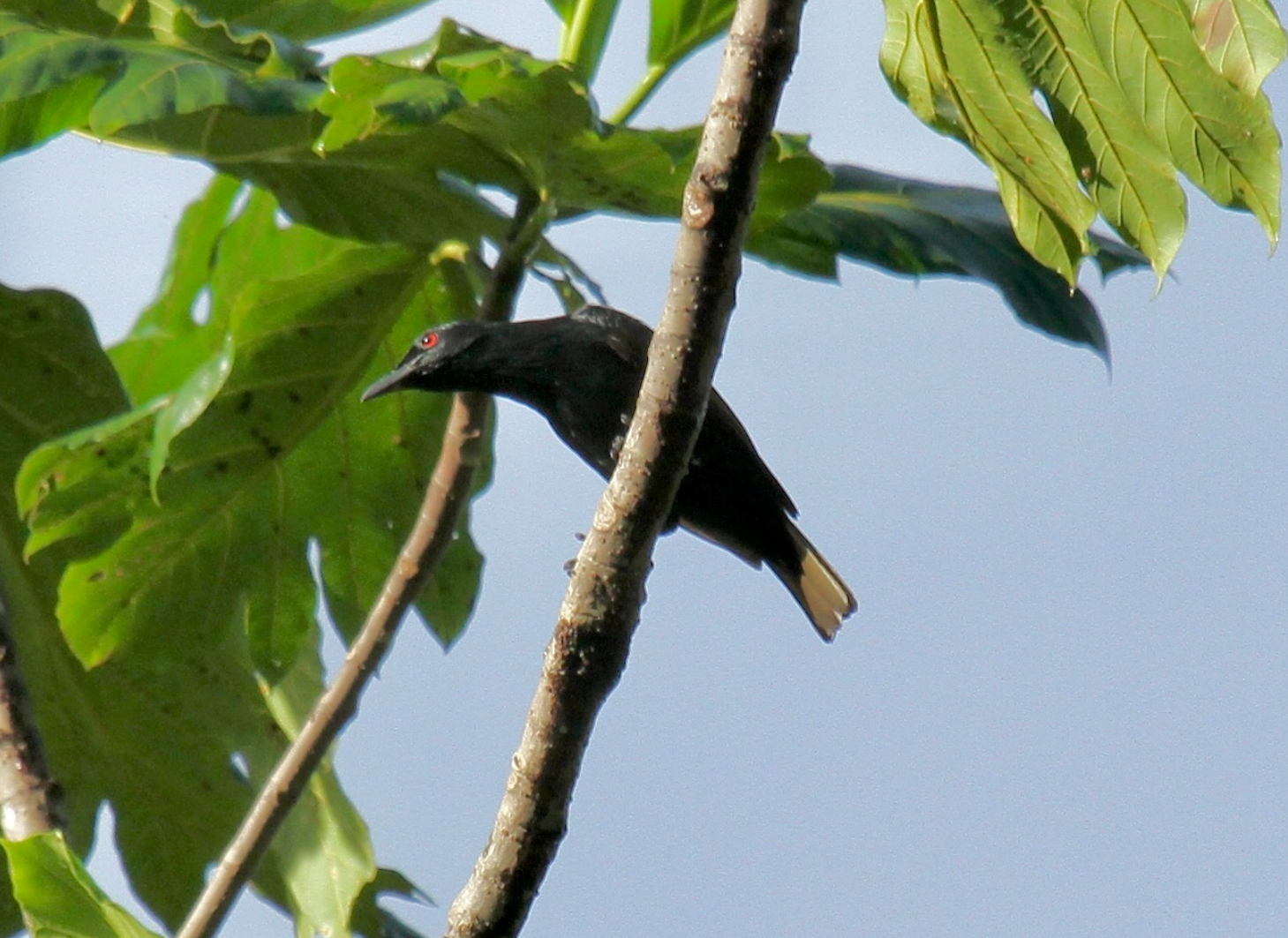

Conservation status
- Least Concern (IUCN 3.1)

Scientific classification
- Kingdom: Animalia
- Phylum: Chordata
- Class: Aves
- Order: Passeriformes
- Family: Sturnidae
- Genus: Aplonis
- Species: A. dichroa

Binomial name
- Aplonis dichroa (Tristram, 1895)
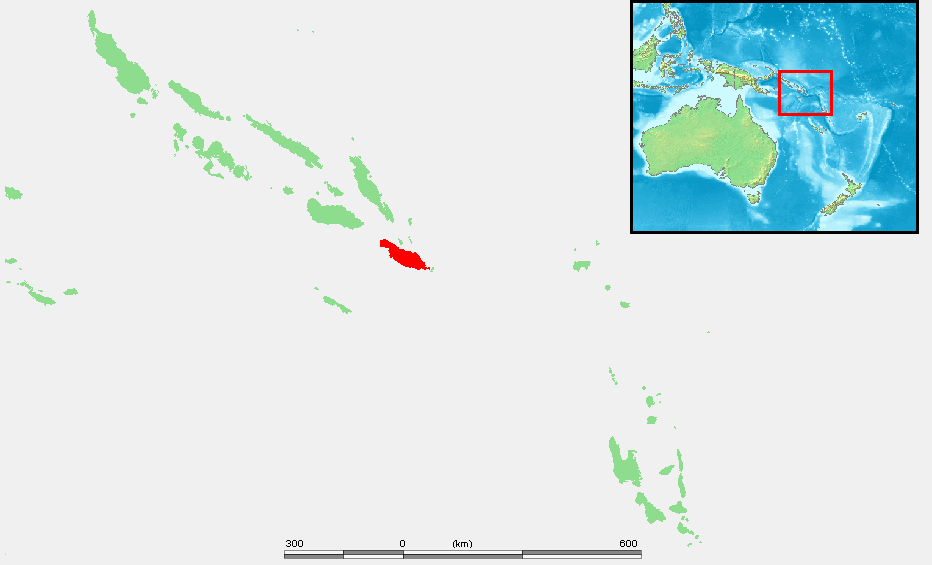

= Makira starling =

Species of bird

The Makira starling (Aplonis dichroa), also known as the San Cristobal starling, is a species of starling in the family Sturnidae. It is endemic to the Solomon Islands. Its natural habitat is subtropical or tropical moist lowland forests.
