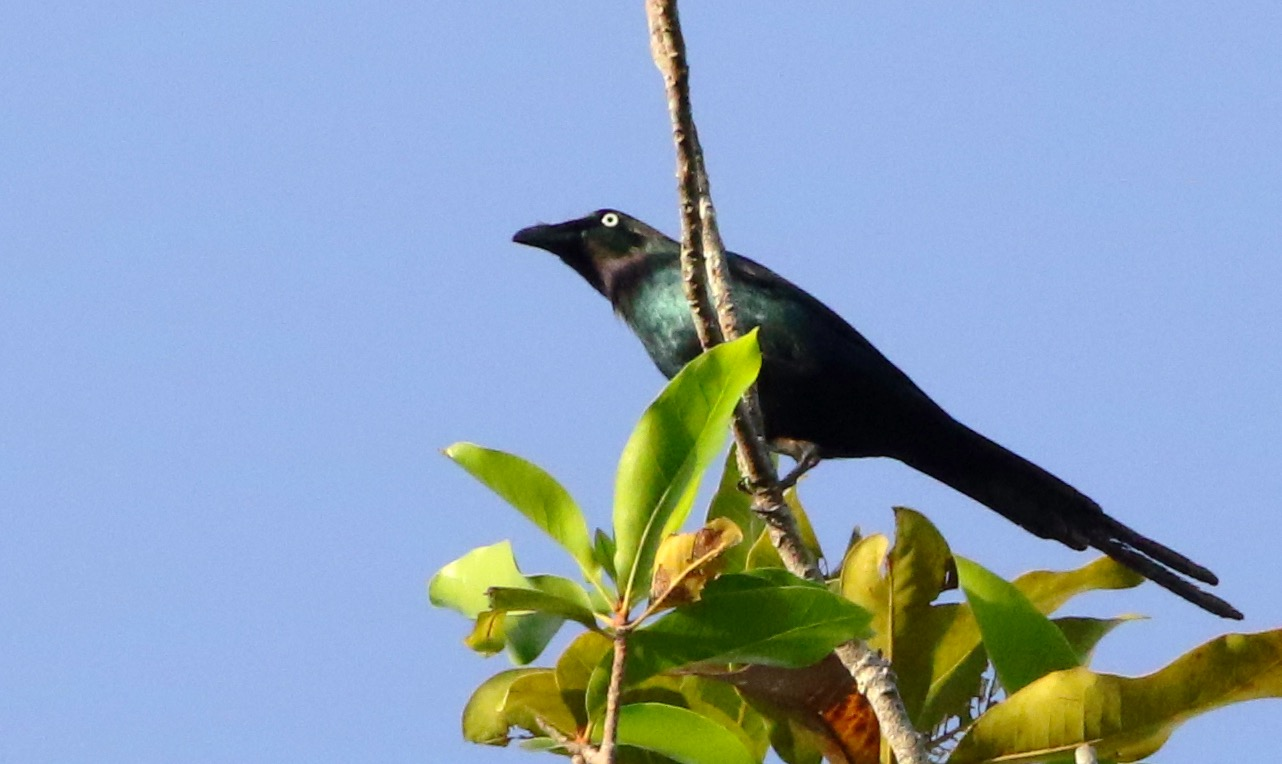

Conservation status
- Vulnerable (IUCN 3.1)

Scientific classification
- Kingdom: Animalia
- Phylum: Chordata
- Class: Aves
- Order: Passeriformes
- Family: Sturnidae
- Genus: Aplonis
- Species: A. brunneicapillus

Binomial name
- Aplonis brunneicapillus (Danis, 1938)

Synonyms
- Aplonis brunneicapilla (Danis, 1938) [orth. error]

= White-eyed starling =

Species of bird

The white-eyed starling (Aplonis brunneicapillus) is a species of starling in the family Sturnidae. It is found in the Solomon Islands archipelago. Its natural habitats are subtropical or tropical moist lowland forests and subtropical or tropical swamps. It is threatened by habitat loss.
