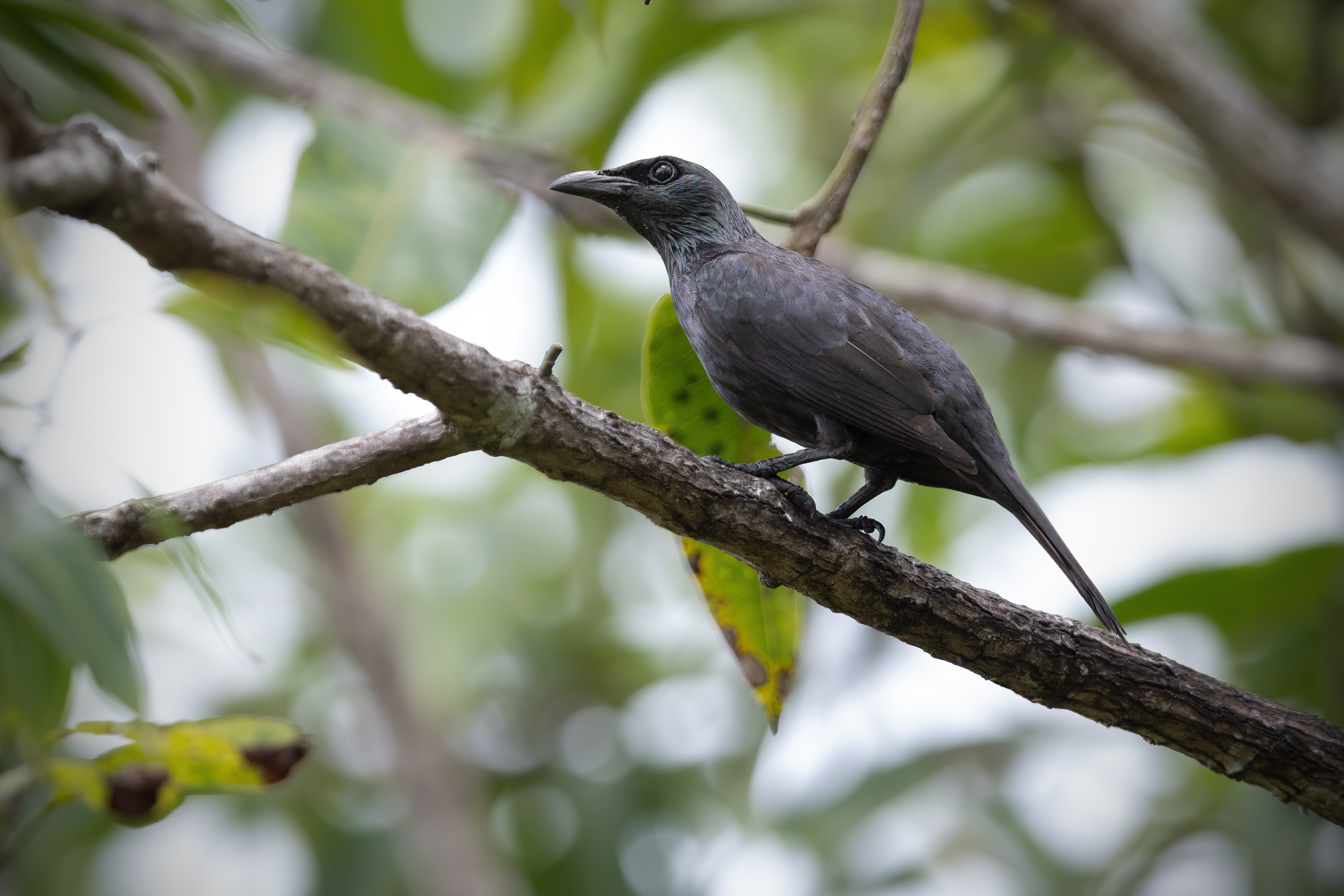

Conservation status
- Least Concern (IUCN 3.1)

Scientific classification
- Kingdom: Animalia
- Phylum: Chordata
- Class: Aves
- Order: Passeriformes
- Family: Sturnidae
- Genus: Aplonis
- Species: A. mysolensis

Binomial name
- Aplonis mysolensis (GR Gray, 1862)

= Moluccan starling =

Species of bird

The Moluccan starling (Aplonis mysolensis) is a species of starling in the family Sturnidae. It is endemic to Indonesia.

Its natural habitats are subtropical or tropical moist lowland forests and subtropical or tropical mangrove forests.
