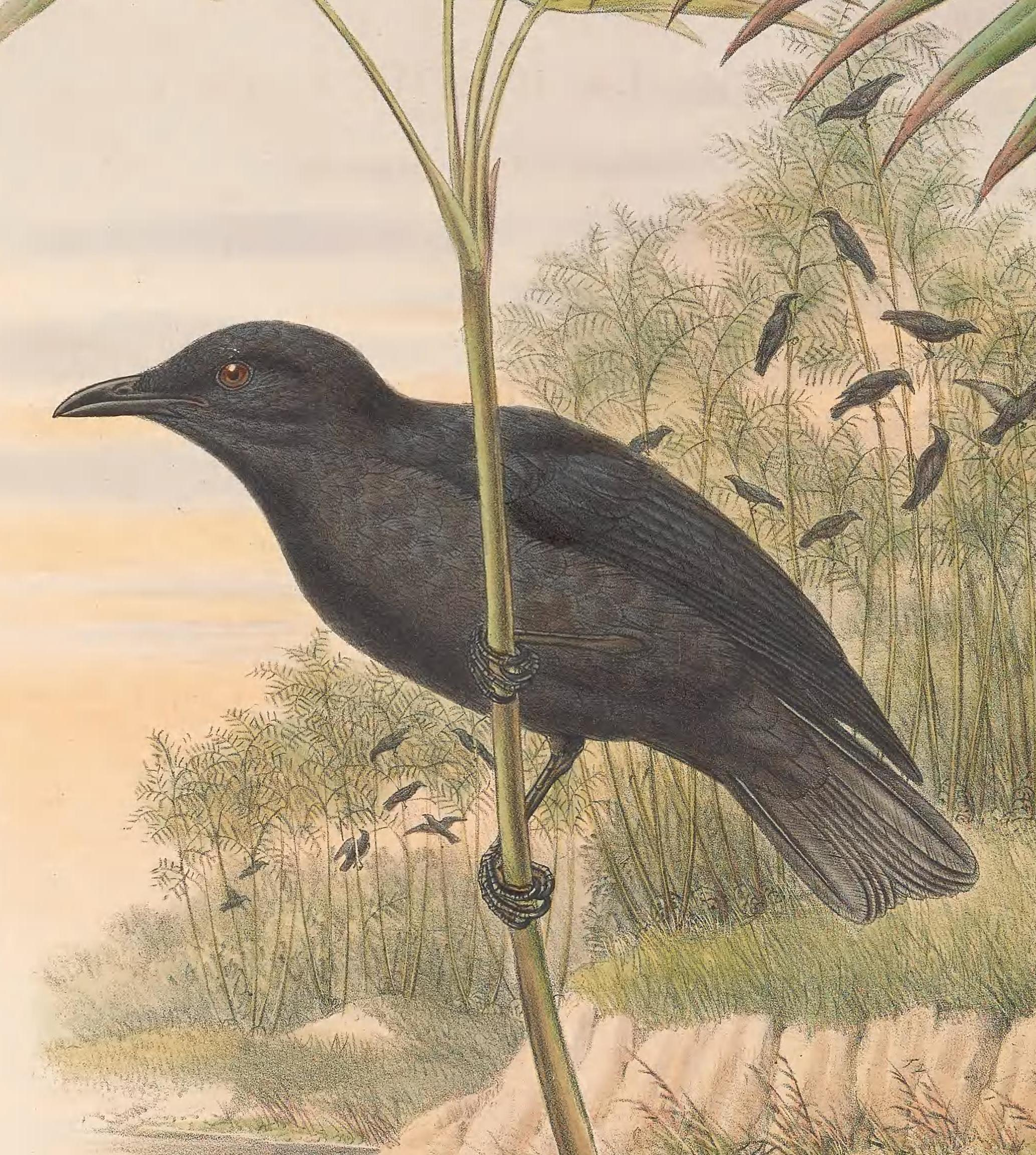
- Illustration by William Matthew Hart

Conservation status
- Near Threatened (IUCN 3.1)

Scientific classification
- Kingdom: Animalia
- Phylum: Chordata
- Class: Aves
- Order: Passeriformes
- Family: Sturnidae
- Genus: Aplonis
- Species: A. feadensis

Binomial name
- Aplonis feadensis (Ramsay, 1882)

= Atoll starling =

Species of bird

The atoll starling (Aplonis feadensis) is a species of starling in the family Sturnidae. It is found in northern Melanesia: Green Islands, Nuguria, Ninigo, Hermit Islands and Ontong Java Atoll. Its natural habitat is subtropical or tropical moist lowland forests. The species nests in holes in trees. It is threatened by habitat loss.
