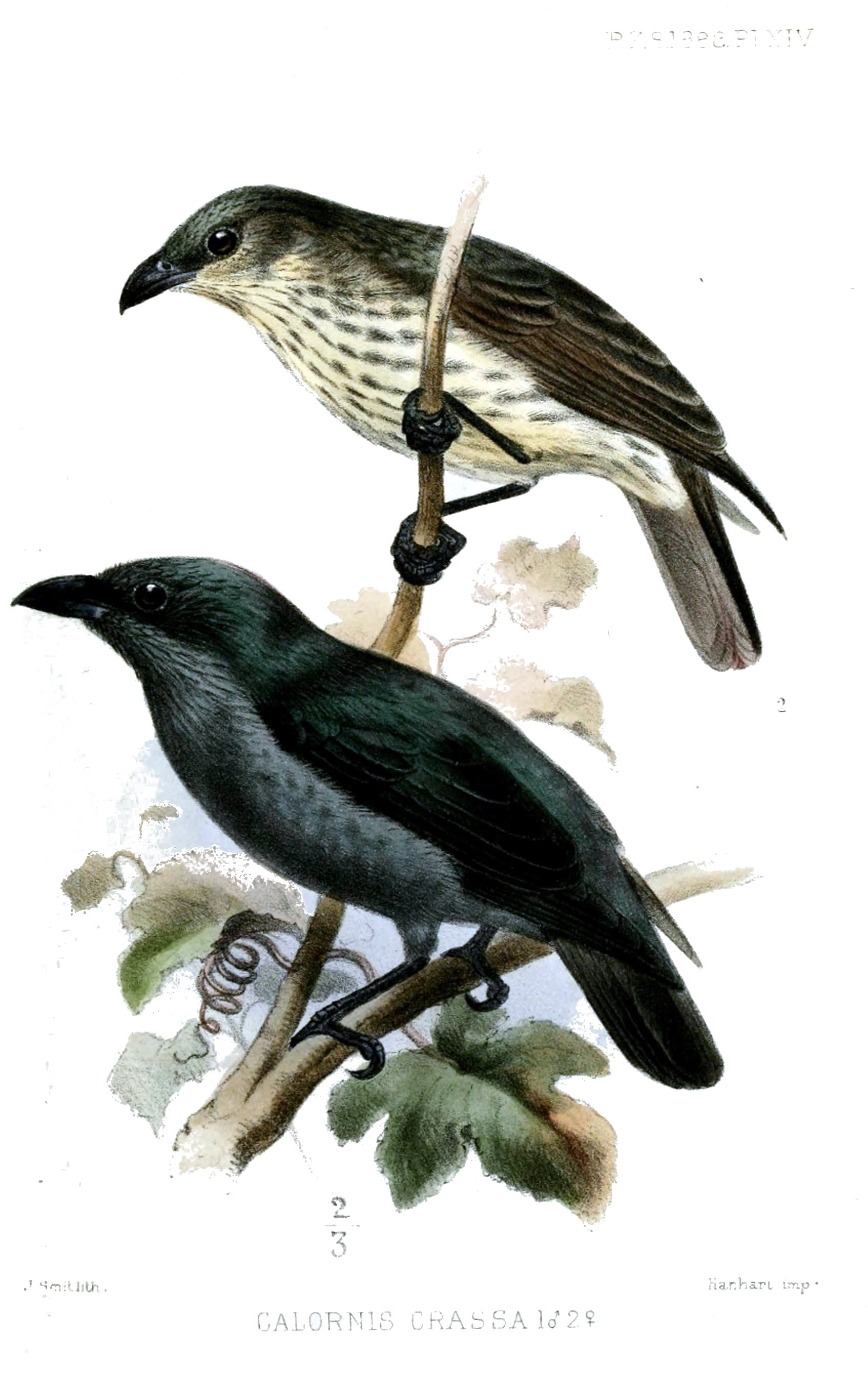

Conservation status
- Near Threatened (IUCN 3.1)

Scientific classification
- Kingdom: Animalia
- Phylum: Chordata
- Class: Aves
- Order: Passeriformes
- Family: Sturnidae
- Genus: Aplonis
- Species: A. crassa

Binomial name
- Aplonis crassa (PL Sclater, 1883)

= Tanimbar starling =

Species of bird

The Tanimbar starling (Aplonis crassa) is a species of starling in the family Sturnidae. It is endemic to Indonesia.

Its natural habitats are subtropical or tropical moist lowland forests and subtropical or tropical mangrove forests. It is threatened by habitat loss.
