= The Conjuror's Bird =

2005 novel by Martin Davies

- Author: Martin Davies
- Language: English
- Publisher: Hodder & Stoughton Ltd
- Publication date: 7 Nov 2005
- Pages: 352
- ISBN: 0-340-89616-7

The Conjuror's Bird is a 2005 novel by British author Martin Davies which fictionalises the early life of botanist Joseph Banks and the search to find the Mysterious Bird of Ulieta. It was selected for the Richard & Judy Book of the Year in 2006.
