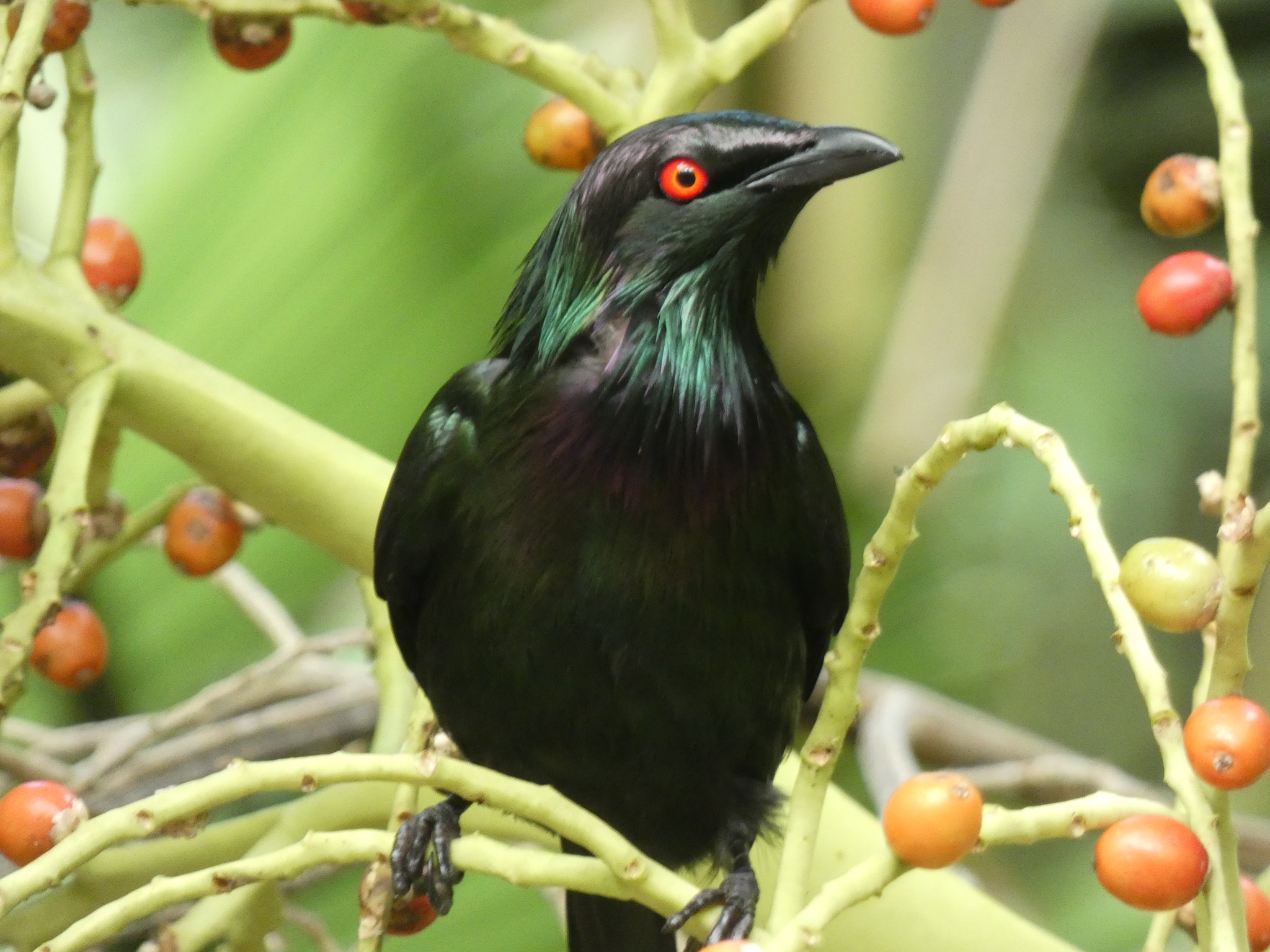
- Metallic starling (Aplonis metallica)

Scientific classification
- Kingdom: Animalia
- Phylum: Chordata
- Class: Aves
- Order: Passeriformes
- Family: Sturnidae
- Genus: Aplonis; Gould, 1836

Type species
- Aplonis fusca Gould, 1836

Synonyms
- Kittlitzia Hartert, 1891

= Aplonis =

Genus of birds

Aplonis is a genus of starlings. These are essentially island species of Indonesia and Oceania, although some species' ranges extend to the Malay Peninsula, southern Vietnam and northeastern Queensland. The typical adult Aplonis starling is fairly uniformly plumaged in black, brown or dark green, sometimes with a metallic gloss. The eye ring is often distinctively coloured. Immatures of several species have dark streaked pale underparts.

Several species have restricted ranges, and, like other island endemics, have become endangered or extinct as a result of habitat loss or introduced mammals such as rats.

== Taxonomy ==
The genus Aplonis was introduced in 1836 by the English ornithologist John Gould. He listed two species in the new genus but did not specify which was the type species. In 1840 George Gray designated the Aplonis fusca Gould 1836 as the type. This is the extinct Tasman starling. The genus name is from Ancient Greek haploos meaning "simple" or "plain" and ornis meaning "bird".

The genus Aplonis contains 24 species. Of these three have become extinct in historical times:

Image	Common name	Scientific name
	Metallic starling	Aplonis metallica
	Yellow-eyed starling	Aplonis mystacea
	Singing starling	Aplonis cantoroides
	Tanimbar starling	Aplonis crassa
	Atoll starling	Aplonis feadensis
	Rennell starling	Aplonis insularis
	Long-tailed starling	Aplonis magna
	White-eyed starling	Aplonis brunneicapillus
	Brown-winged starling	Aplonis grandis
	Makira starling	Aplonis dichroa
	Rusty-winged starling	Aplonis zelandica
	Striated starling	Aplonis striata
	† Tasman starling: † Norfolk starling; † Lord Howe starling	Aplonis fusca (extinct c.1923): Aplonis fusca fusca (extinct c.1923); Aplonis fusca hulliana (extinct c.1919)
	Mountain starling	Aplonis santovestris
	Asian glossy starling	Aplonis panayensis
	Moluccan starling	Aplonis mysolensis
	Short-tailed starling	Aplonis minor
	Micronesian starling	Aplonis opaca
	Pohnpei starling	Aplonis pelzelni (possibly extinct, c.2000)
	Polynesian starling	Aplonis tabuensis
	Samoan starling	Aplonis atrifusca
	† Kosrae starling	Aplonis corvina (extinct, mid-19th century)
	† Mauke starling	Aplonis mavornata (extinct, mid-19th century)
	Rarotonga starling	Aplonis cinerascens

An additional species is known only from fossils:

- † Huahine starling, Aplonis diluvialis (prehistoric)
