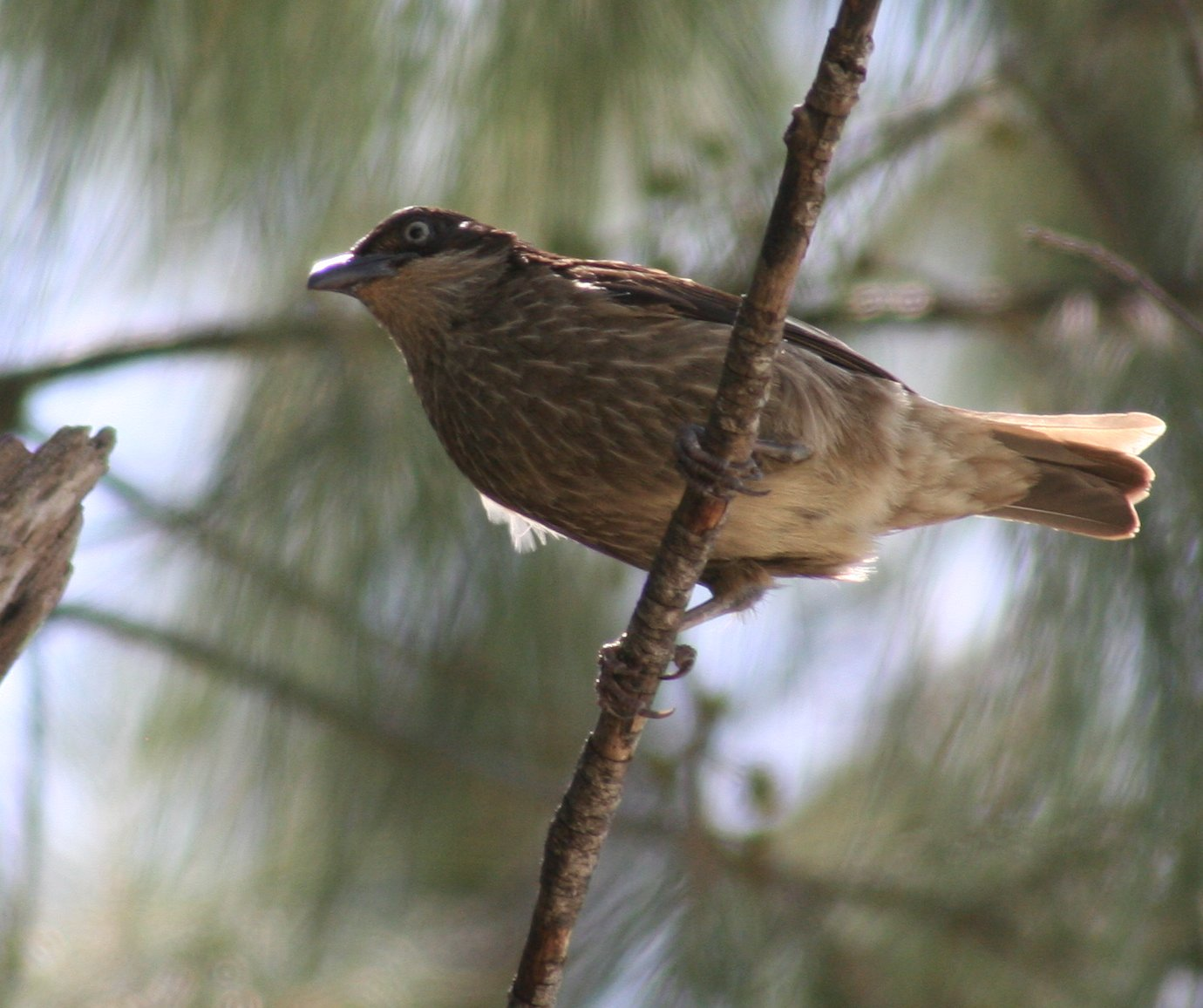

Conservation status
- Least Concern (IUCN 3.1)

Scientific classification
- Kingdom: Animalia
- Phylum: Chordata
- Class: Aves
- Order: Passeriformes
- Family: Sturnidae
- Genus: Aplonis
- Species: A. tabuensis

Binomial name
- Aplonis tabuensis (Gmelin, JF, 1788)

= Polynesian starling =

Species of bird

The Polynesian starling (Aplonis tabuensis) is a species of starling of the family Sturnidae. It is found in the Samoan Islands, Fiji, Niue, Tonga, the Santa Cruz Islands and Wallis and Futuna. Its natural habitats are subtropical or tropical dry forests and tropical moist forests. Various subspecies exist throughout this wide range, some darker in coloration and some lighter. Its call is a raspy buzz or rattle. Diet is fruit and insects. The eggs are blue, with brown or red-brown specks or blotches.

On small islands it is found in all vegetated areas, including scrub, coconut plantations, and villages. On larger islands it prefers forested areas. On islands where the Samoan starling is present, the Polynesian starling is less conspicuous and keeps to the forest, feeding on harder, less edible fruit.

== Taxonomy ==
The Polynesian starling was formally described in 1788 by the German naturalist Johann Friedrich Gmelin in his revised and expanded edition of Carl Linnaeus's Systema Naturae. He placed it with the shrikes in the genus Lanius and coined the binomial name Lanius tabuensis. The specific epithet is from the toponym Tongatapu, one of the main islands of Tonga. Gmelin based his account on the "Tabuan shrike" that had been described in 1781 by the English ornithologist John Latham in his book A General Synopsis of Birds. Latham had examined a specimen from "Tongo Taboo" (Tongatapu) that was held by the Leverian Museum in London. The Polynesian starling is now placed in the genus Aplonis that was introduced in 1836 by John Gould.

Twelve subspecies are recognised:

- A. t. pachyrhampha Mayr, 1942 – Tinakula and Swallow (northwest Santa Cruz Islands=Temotu, southeast Solomon Islands)
- A. t. tucopiae Mayr, 1942 – Tucopia (=Tikopia, southeast Santa Cruz Islands=Temotu, southeast Solomon Islands)
- A. t. rotumae Mayr, 1942 – Rotuma (far northwest Fiji, southwest Polynesia)
- A. t. vitiensis Layard, EL, 1876 – Fiji (except Rotuma, far northwest, and Lau group, far east; southwest Polynesia)
- A. t. manuae Mayr, 1942 – Manua group (American Samoa, central Polynesia)
- A. t. tabuensis (Gmelin, JF, 1788) – Lau Islands (east Fiji, southwest Polynesia) and Tonga (central south Polynesia)
- A. t. fortunae Layard, EL, 1876 – Wallis and Futuna (northeast of Fiji, southwest Polynesia)
- A. t. tenebrosa Mayr, 1942 – north Tonga (central south Polynesia)
- A. t. nesiotes Mayr, 1942 – northwest Tonga (central south Polynesia)
- A. t. brunnescens Sharpe, 1890 – Niue (central south Polynesia)
- A. t. tutuilae Mayr, 1942 – Tutuila (American Samoa, central Polynesia)
- A. t. brevirostris (Peale, 1849) – Savaii and Upolu (west Samoa, central Polynesia)

== Gallery ==
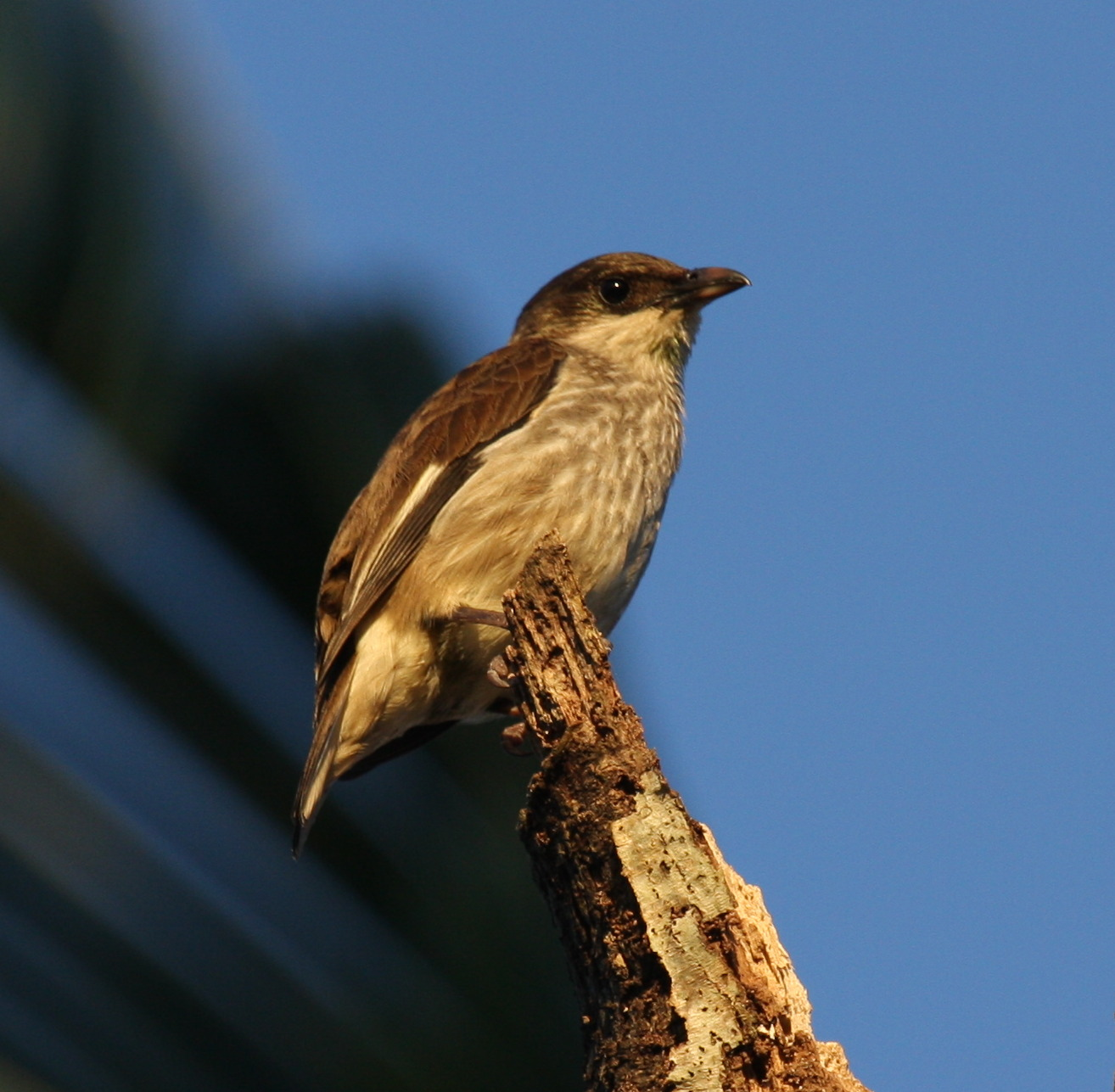
Matei, Taveuni, Fiji Isles

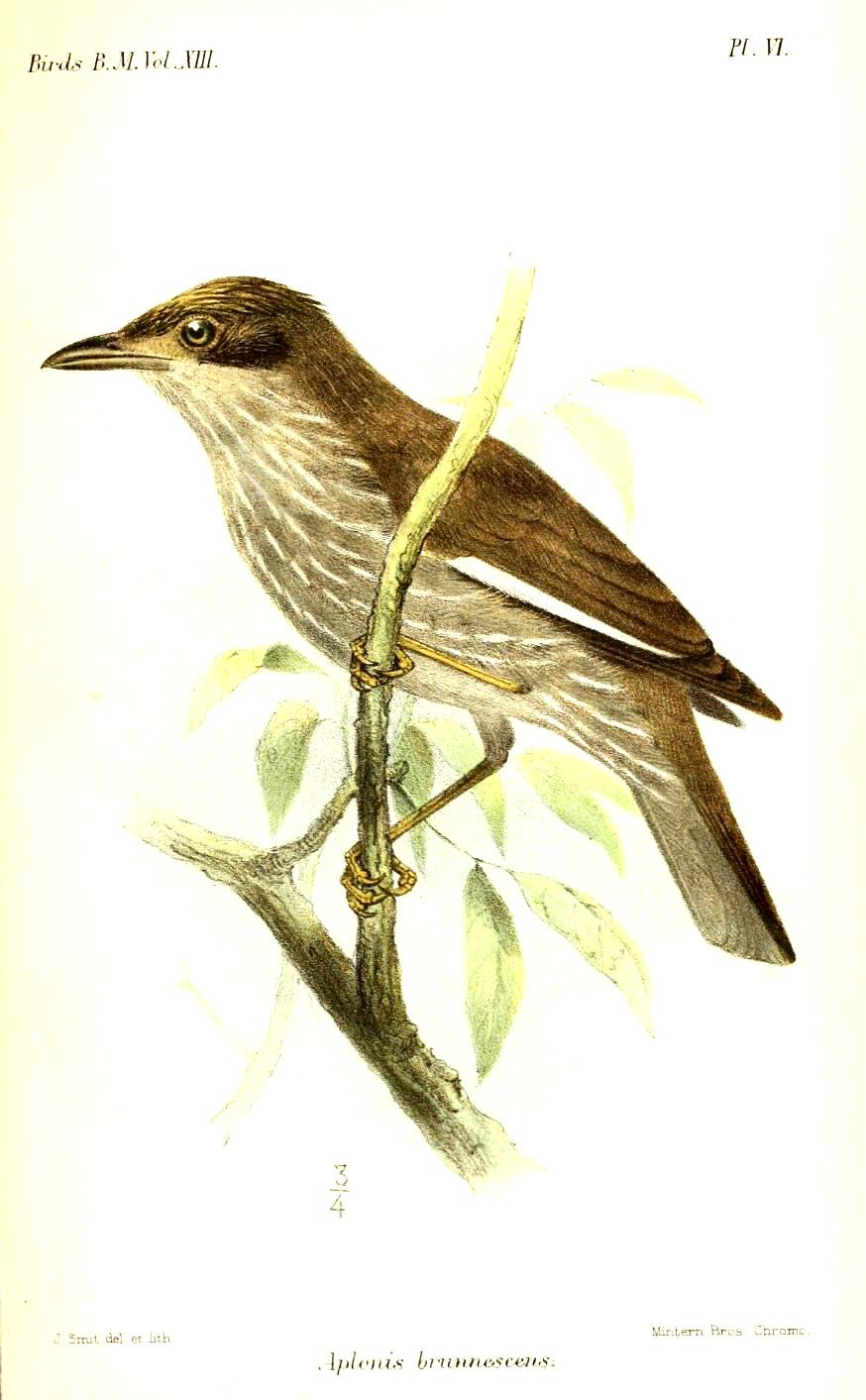
Subspecies A. t. brunnescens, illustration by Joseph Smit, 1890
