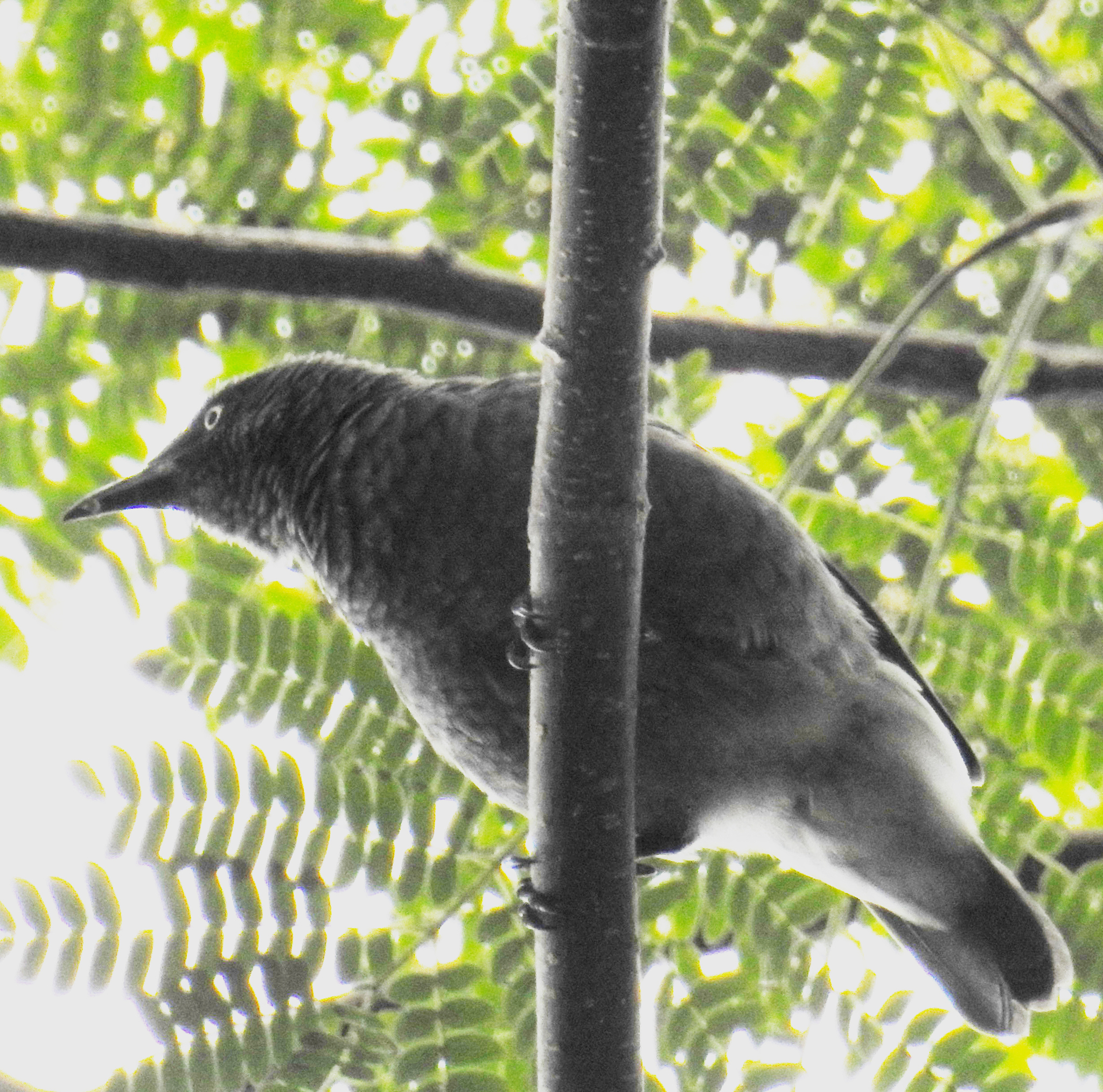

Conservation status
- Near Threatened (IUCN 3.1)

Scientific classification
- Kingdom: Animalia
- Phylum: Chordata
- Class: Aves
- Order: Passeriformes
- Family: Sturnidae
- Genus: Aplonis
- Species: A. cinerascens

Binomial name
- Aplonis cinerascens Hartlaub & Finsch, 1871

= Rarotonga starling =

Species of bird

The Rarotonga starling (Aplonis cinerascens) is a species of starling in the family Sturnidae. It is endemic to only Rarotonga in the Cook Islands, and was rated as Vulnerable from 2000 up until 2023, when its status was changed to Near Threatened on the International Union for Conservation of Nature's Red List.

== Description ==
It is described as "a medium-sized gray and grayish-brown starling with a thin dark eye mask and a pale yellow eye" with a "bright white undertail". Its length is 8 inches (20 cm) and it has a short tail and "modest" beak. It is shy.

It resides in tropical montane cloud forests in the interior of the island at elevations of 150 to 600 metres (490 to 1,970 ft), but has been seen down as low as 30 metres (98 ft).

It forages alone or in pairs and feeds on nectar, fruit and insects, particularly from the flowers of the Fitchia speciosa, which it pollinates. It seems to prefer nesting in trees such as the Bischofia javanica, Homalium acuminatum and Hernandia moerenhoutiana, with nests being reused in following years. The breeding season is from August to December, producing more than one egg per clutch.

Its lifespan is around four years.

Estimates of its population range under 100 in the 1980s to 500 in 1997 to 1200 in 2010 or 2350 adults in 2010.

Its vocalizations consist mainly of "squeaks, whistles, and bell-like notes."

== Threats ==
The common myna and black rat may pose a threat. Loss of habitat and "exotic avian diseases" to which the starling has no immunity are also considered dangers.
