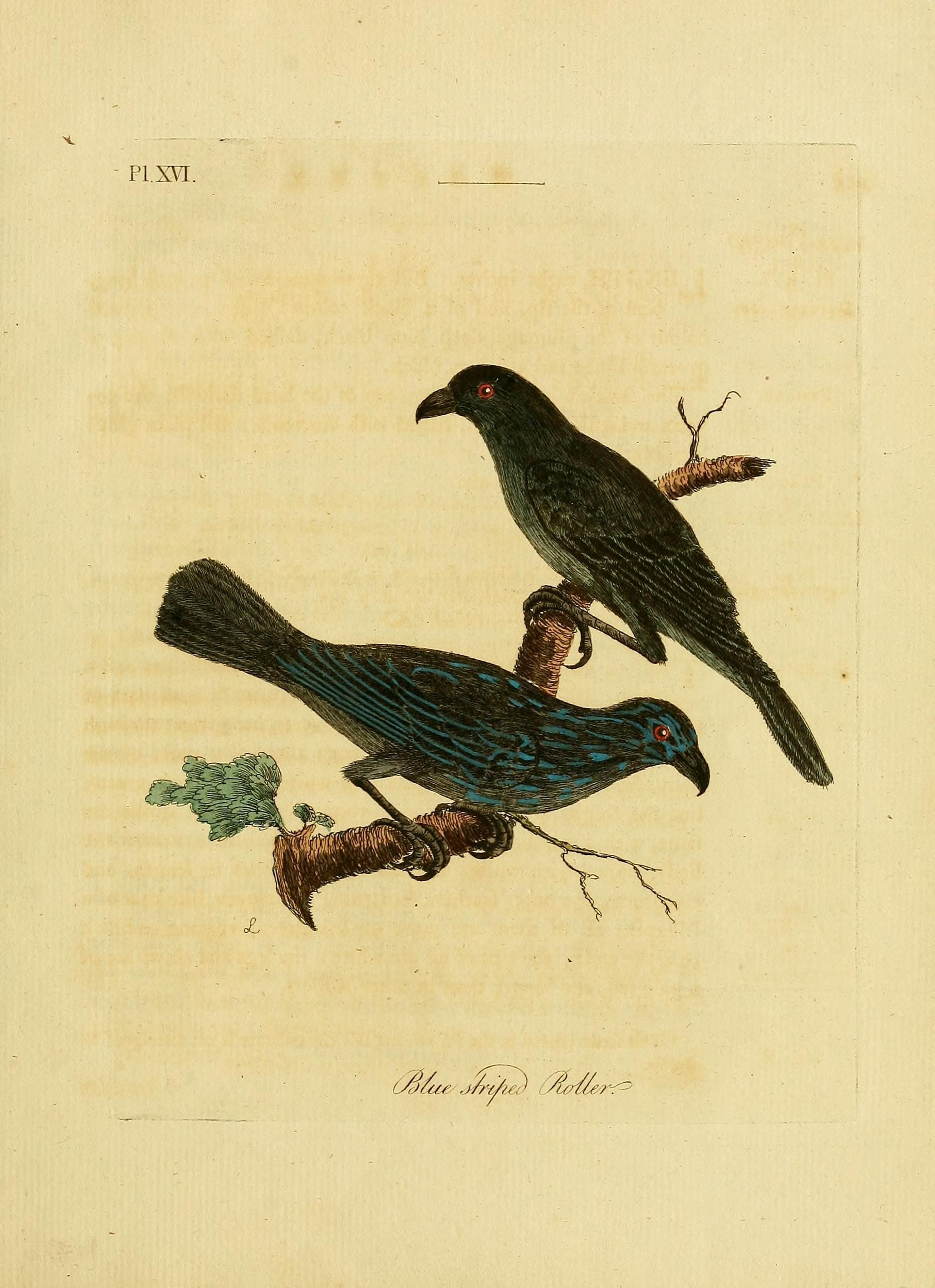
- Illustration by John Latham (1781)
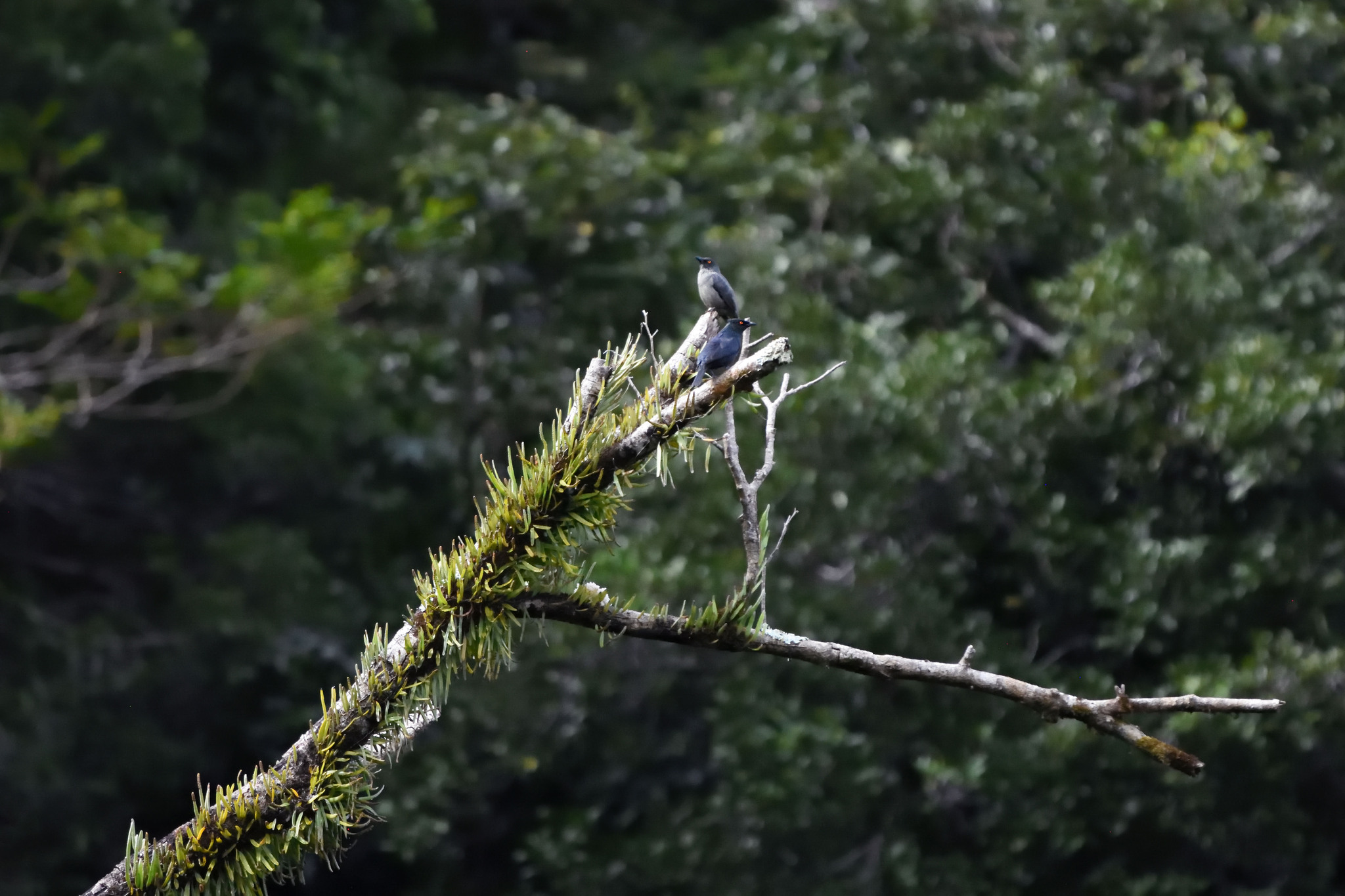

Conservation status
- Least Concern (IUCN 3.1)

Scientific classification
- Kingdom: Animalia
- Phylum: Chordata
- Class: Aves
- Order: Passeriformes
- Family: Sturnidae
- Genus: Aplonis
- Species: A. striata

Binomial name
- Aplonis striata (Gmelin, JF, 1788)

= Striated starling =

Species of bird

The striated starling (Aplonis striata) is a species of starling in the family Sturnidae. It is endemic to New Caledonia.

== Taxonomy ==
The striated starling was formally described in 1788 by the German naturalist Johann Friedrich Gmelin in his revised and expanded edition of Carl Linnaeus's Systema Naturae. He placed it with the rollers in the genus Coracias and coined the binomial name Coracias striata. The specific epithet is from Latin striatus meaning "striated". Gmelin based his account on the "Blue-striped roller" that had been described and illustrated in 1781 by the English ornithologist John Latham in his book A General Synopsis of Birds. The striated starling is now placed in the genus Aplonis that was introduced in 1836 by John Gould.

Two subspecies are recognised:

- Aplonis striata striata (Gmelin, JF, 1788) – Grande Terre and Ile des Pinss (New Caledonia)
- Aplonis striata atronitens Gray, GR, 1859 – Ouvéa, Lifou and Maré (Loyalty Islands)
