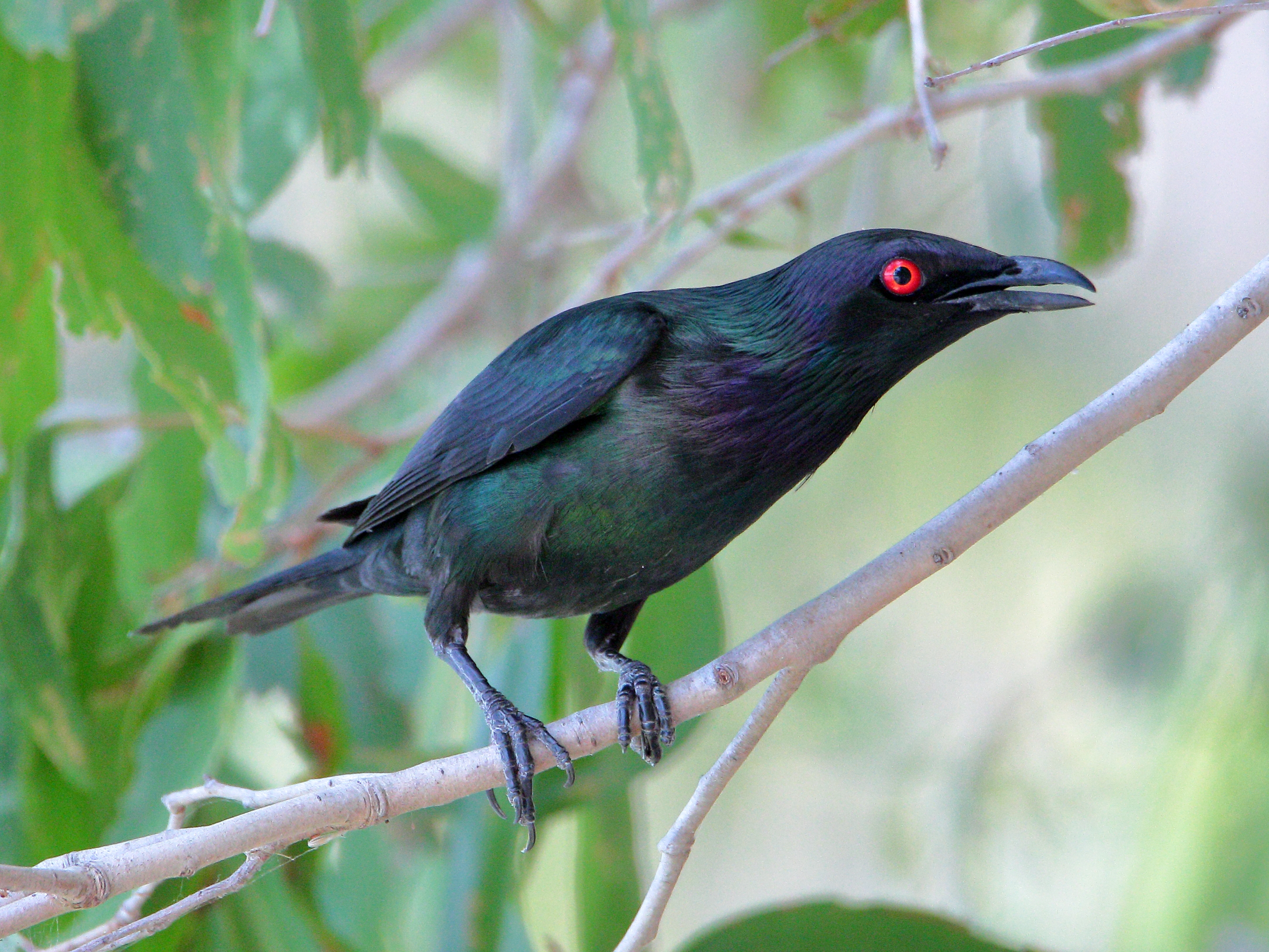
- At Cairns, Queensland, Australia

Conservation status
- Least Concern (IUCN 3.1)

Scientific classification
- Kingdom: Animalia
- Phylum: Chordata
- Class: Aves
- Order: Passeriformes
- Family: Sturnidae
- Genus: Aplonis
- Species: A. metallica

Binomial name
- Aplonis metallica (Temminck, 1824)

= Metallic starling =

Species of bird

The metallic starling (Aplonis metallica), also known as the shining starling, is a bird in the starling family native to the Moluccas, New Guinea, Queensland and the Solomon Islands.

== Taxonomy ==
The metallic starling was formally described and illustrated as Lamprotornis metallicus in 1824 by the Dutch zoologist Coenraad Jacob Temminck. He mistakenly specified the locality as Timor and Celebres but this has been corrected to the island of Ambon in the Maluku Islands of Indonesia. The metallic starling is now one of 24 starlings placed in the genus Aplonis that was introduced in 1836 by the English ornithologist John Gould.

Five subspecies are recognised:

- A. m. metallica (Temminck, CJ, 1824) – Moluccas, Sula Islands, New Guinea including Aru Islands, and northeastern Australia (Cape York Peninsula southward to Sarina, northern Queensland)
- A. m. nitida (Gray, GR, 1858) – Admiralty Islands (Rambutyo, Tong, and outer Islands), Bismarck Archipelago, and Solomon Islands
- A. m. purpureiceps (Salvadori, AT, 1878) – Admiralty Islands (Manus Island and Los Negros Islands)
- A. m. inornata (Salvadori, AT, 1881) – Numfor and Biak (Cenderawasih Bay, off northwestern New Guinea)
- A. m. circumscripta (Meyer, AB, 1884) – Tanimbar Islands (Larat and Kirimoen) and Damar Island

The subspecies A. m. circumscripta has sometimes been considered as a separate species, the violet-hooded starling.

== Description ==
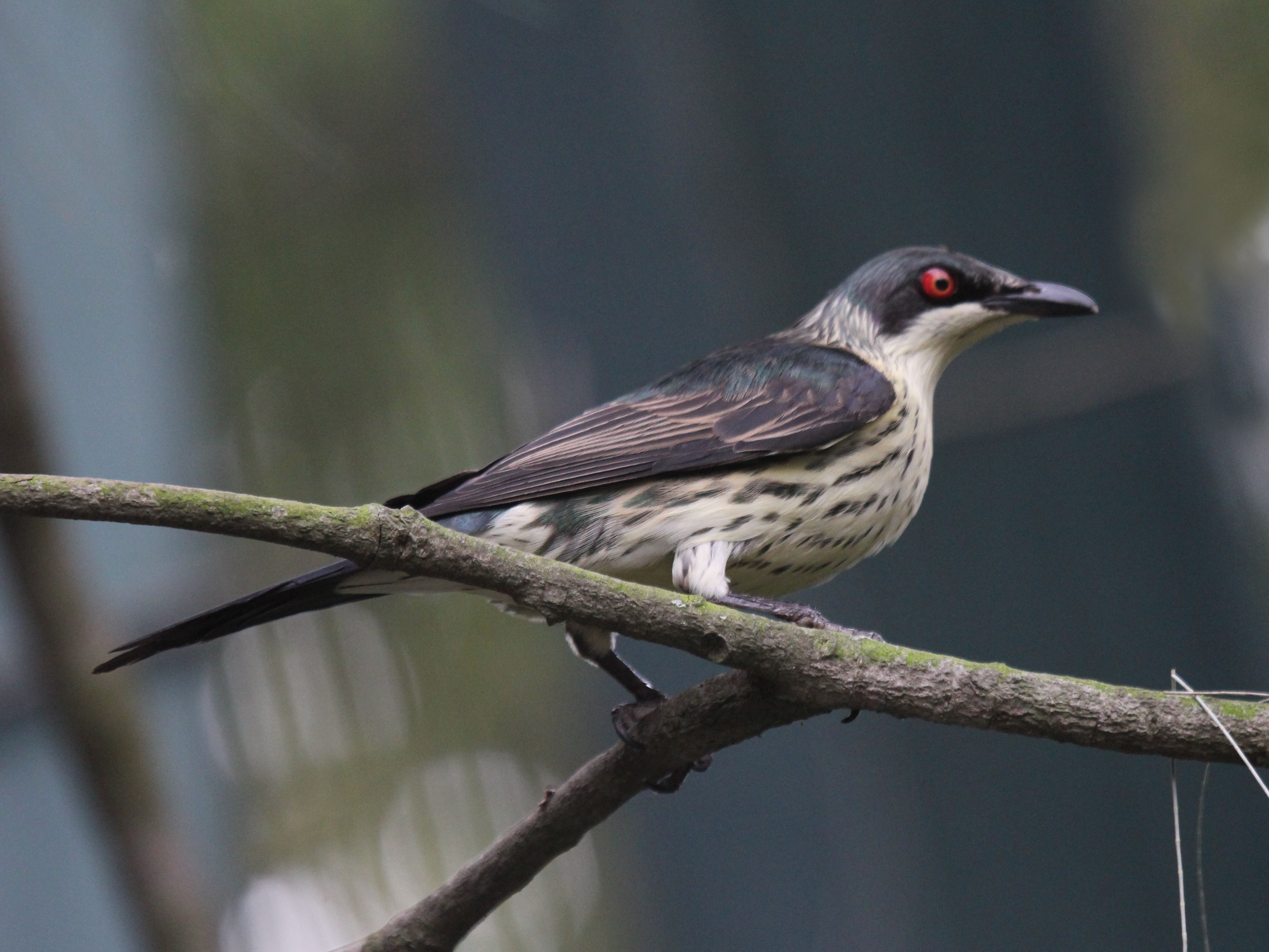
Immature at San Diego Zoo

The adult has brilliant red eyes, a long forked tail and green-glossed black plumage. Immatures are pale below with dark streaks.

== Behaviour ==
They are very social and flocks of them build messy suspended globular nests in tall rain forest trees where they breed, possibly only during the wet season (north-west monsoon, October–March) (observed at Kokopo, East New Britain Province, 2016). They are not fearful of humans and their activity on the ground below, being well separated from them by altitude, but a loud noise will see them fly out in a tight formation, circle, then return to their nests. Their movement is very fast. During the early part of the 20th century, a flock (or flocks) were seen to migrate during August to Dunk Island in far north Queensland, where they mate, preparing messy globular nests for their young which hang from tall trees. There they remain until April, whereupon they make their return journey to New Guinea. They are also seen in other areas of Queensland including Kuranda in the Atherton Tablelands, and Mossman Gorge.

== Gallery ==
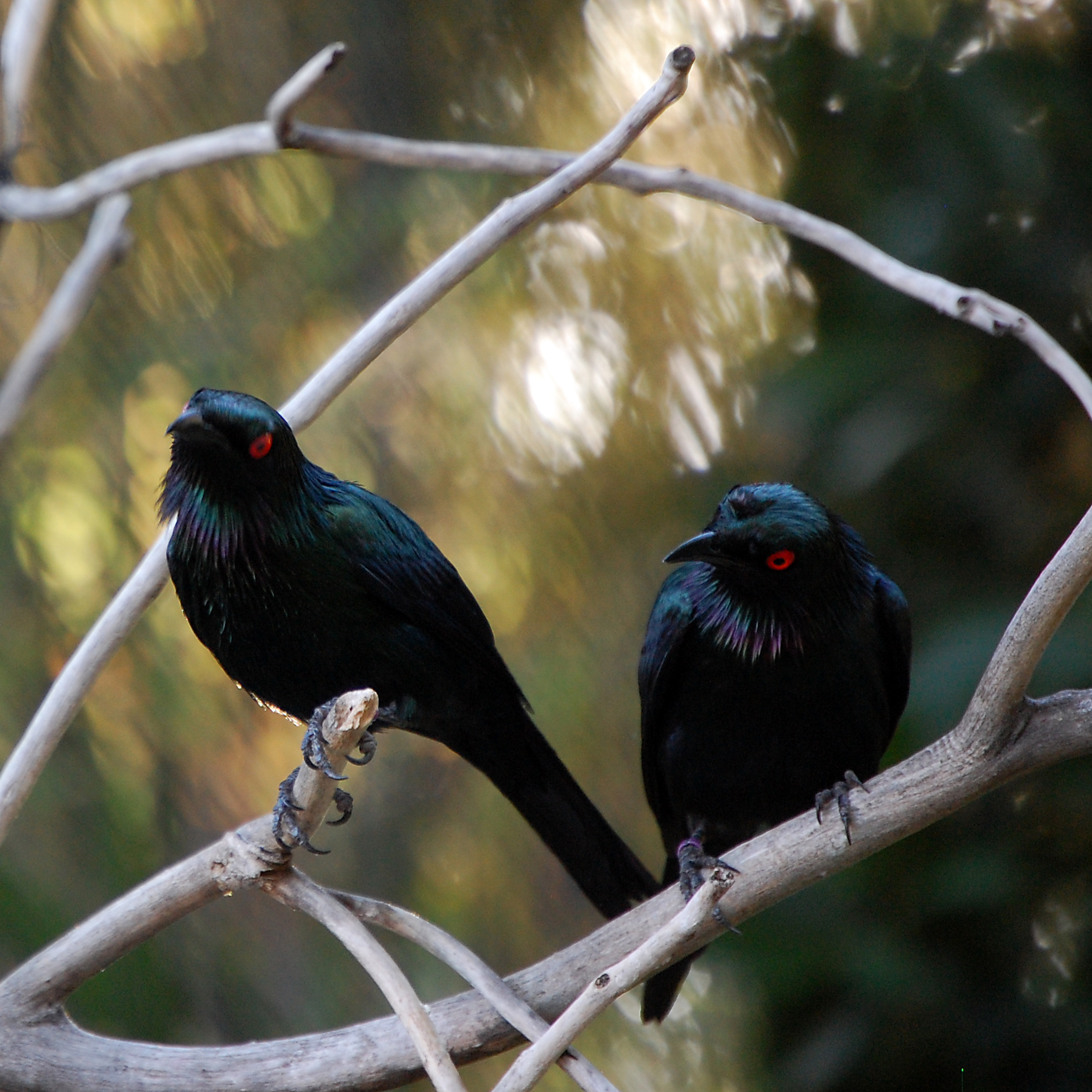
Phoenix Zoo, Arizona

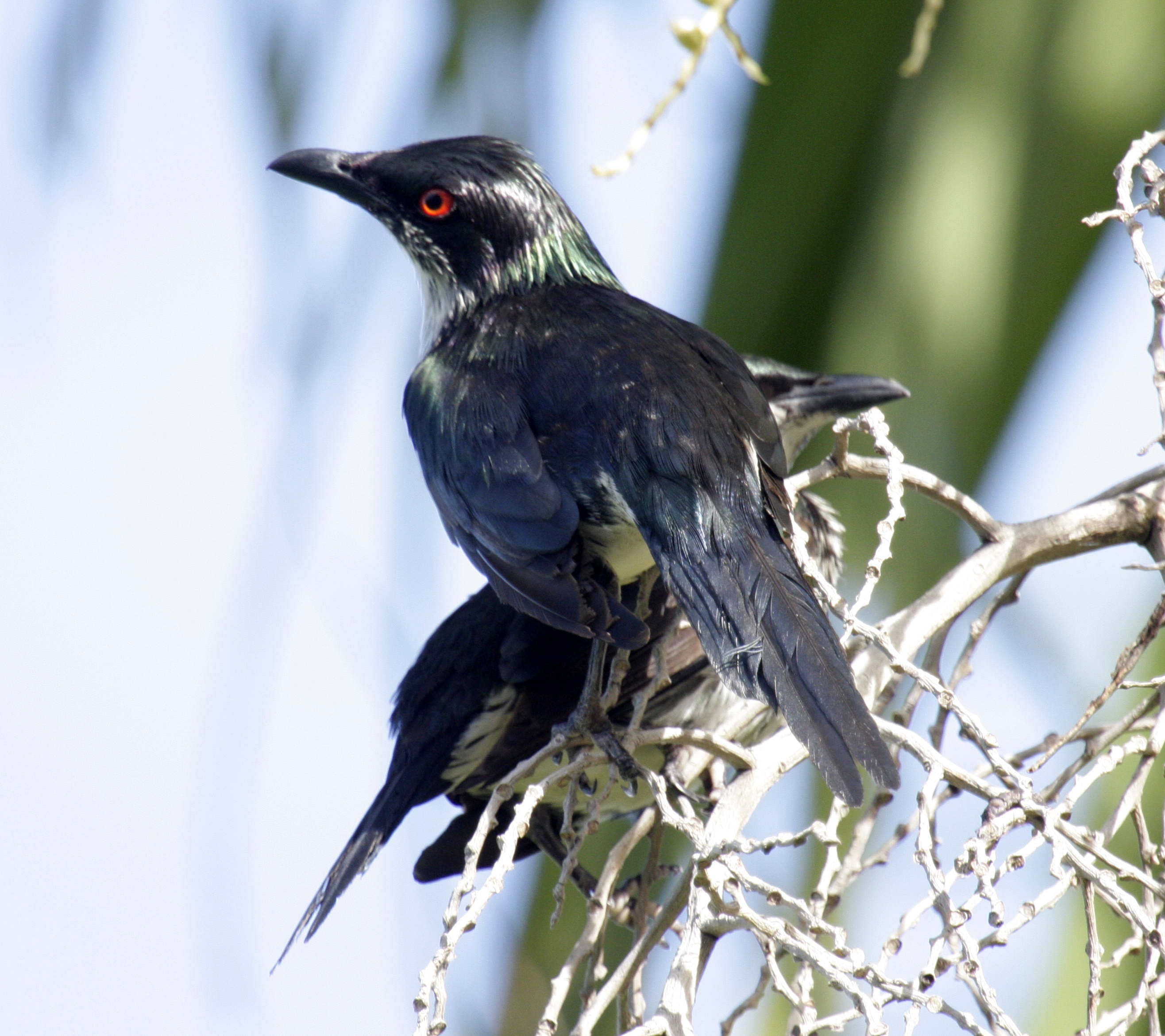
Juveniles, Cairns Esplanade, North Queensland

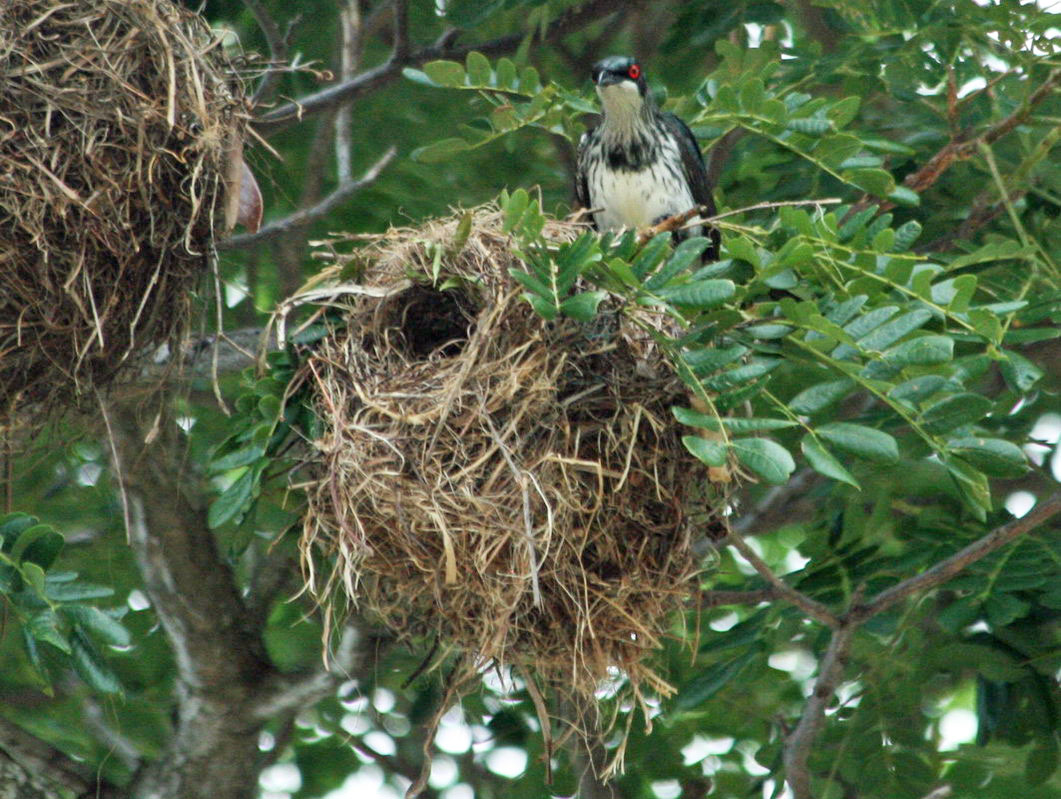
Female with nest - Cairns, Queensland

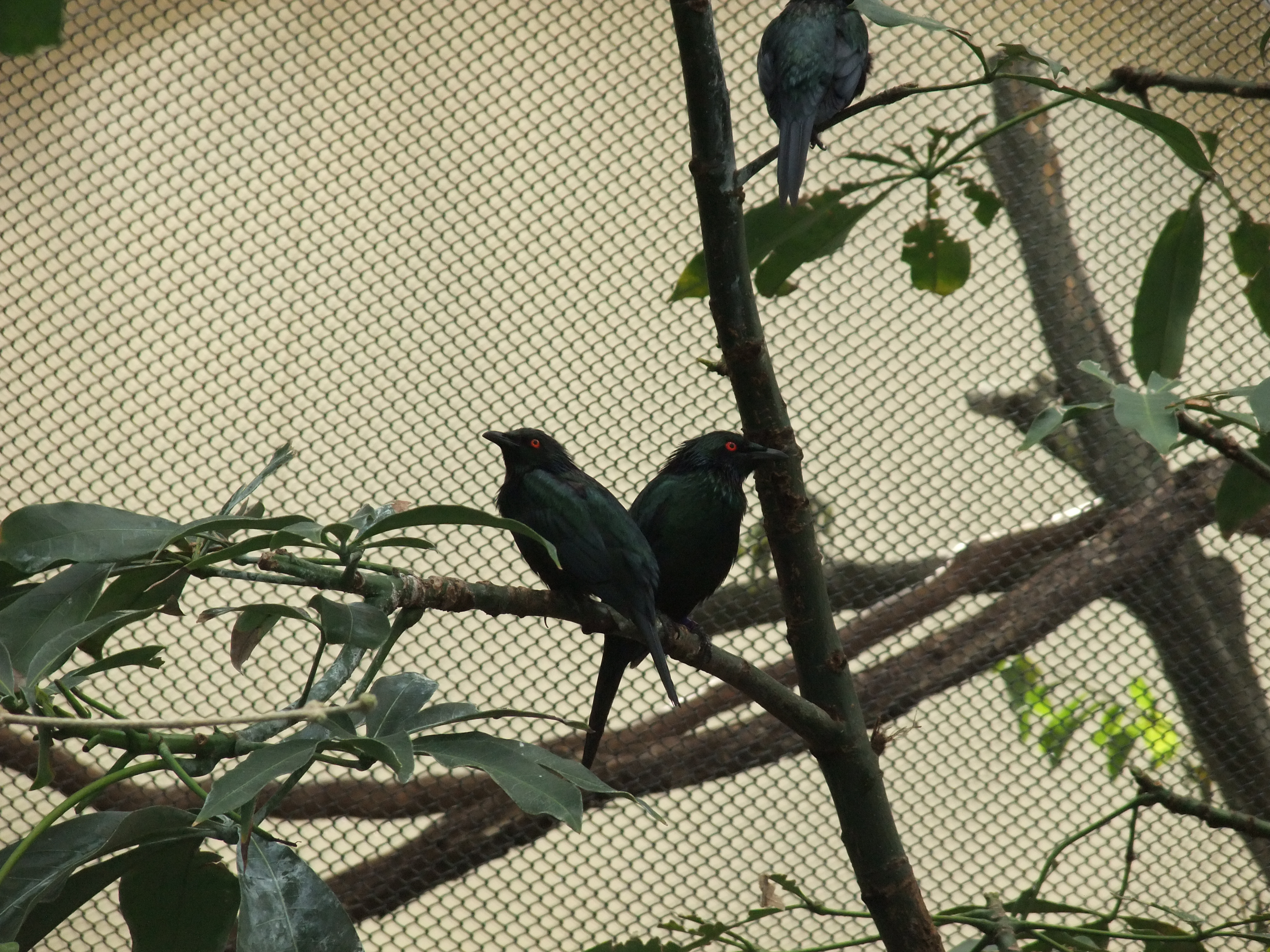

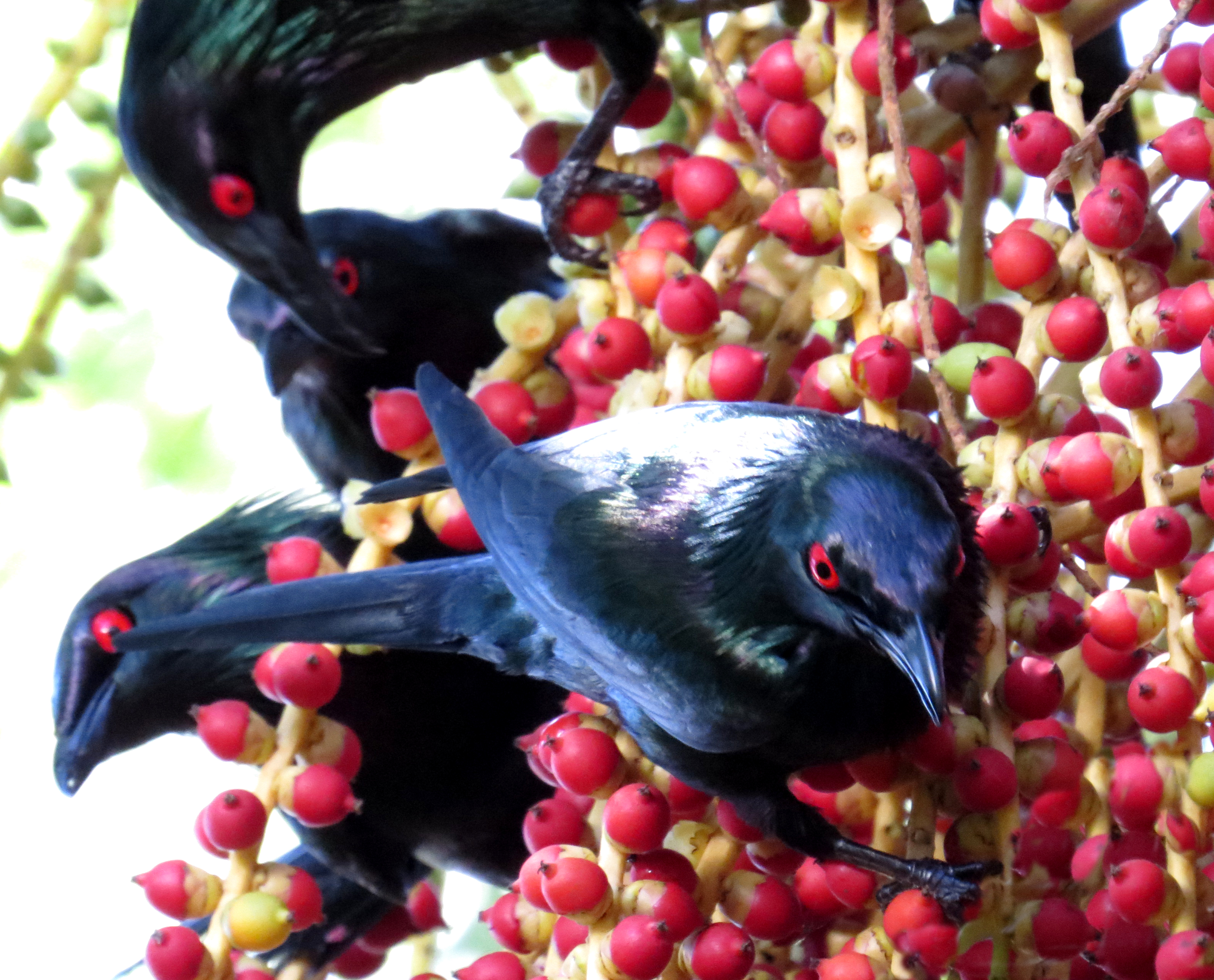
Feeding on Ptychosperma elegans fruit in Cairns, Queensland

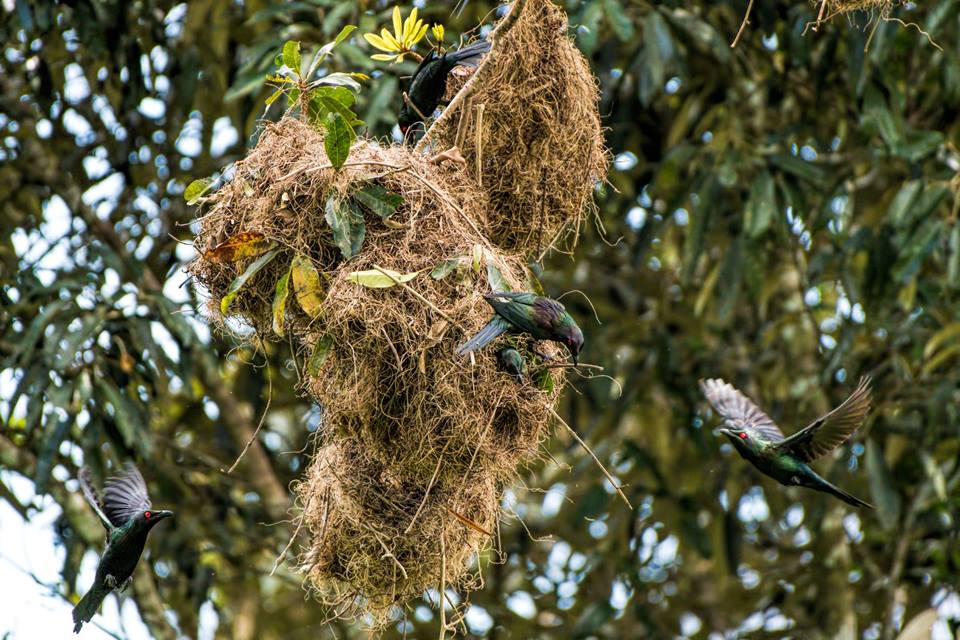
Metallic Starlings around high nests in the Daintree Rainforest in Queensland.

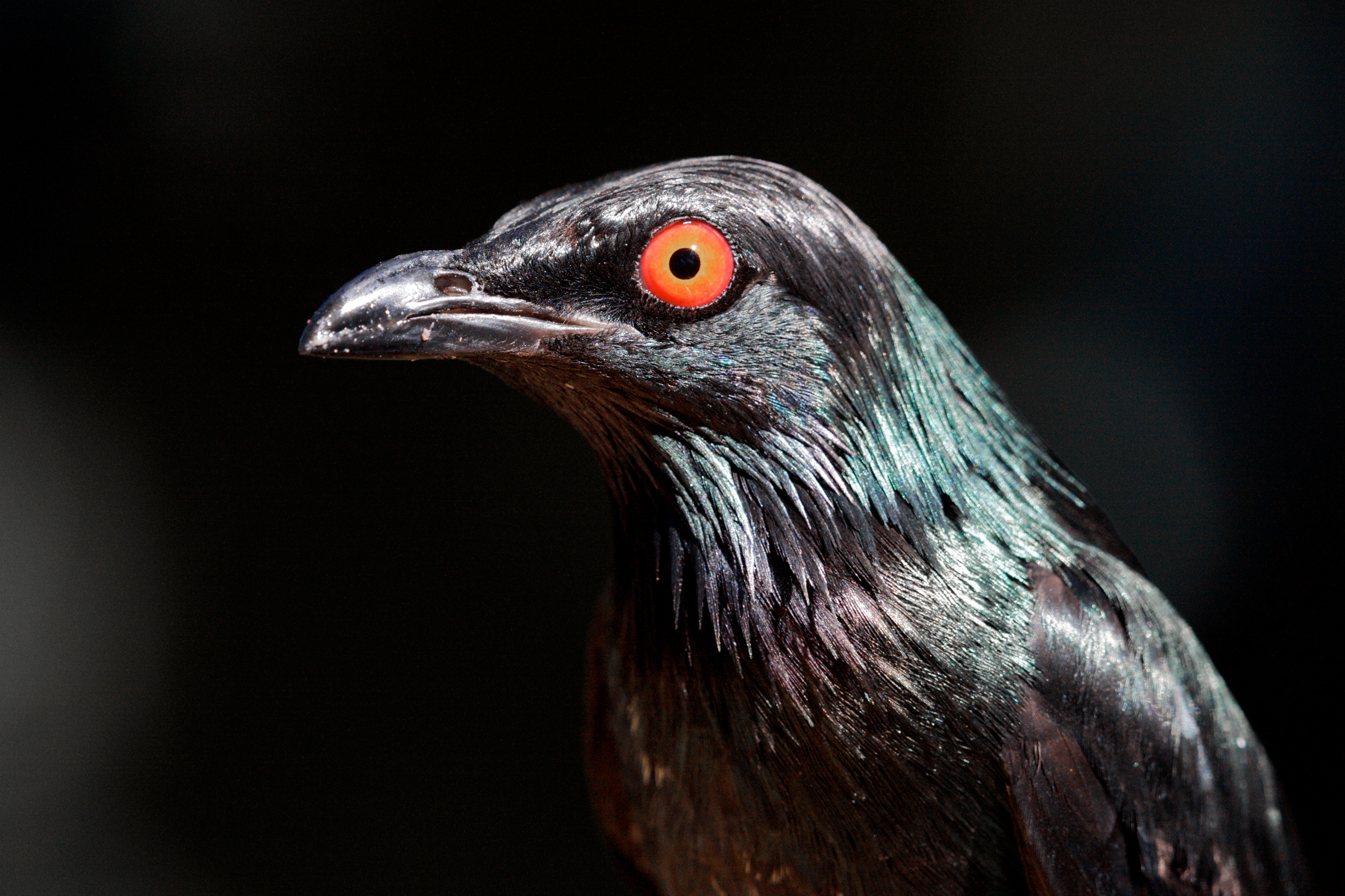
Male at San Diego Zoo, California, USA

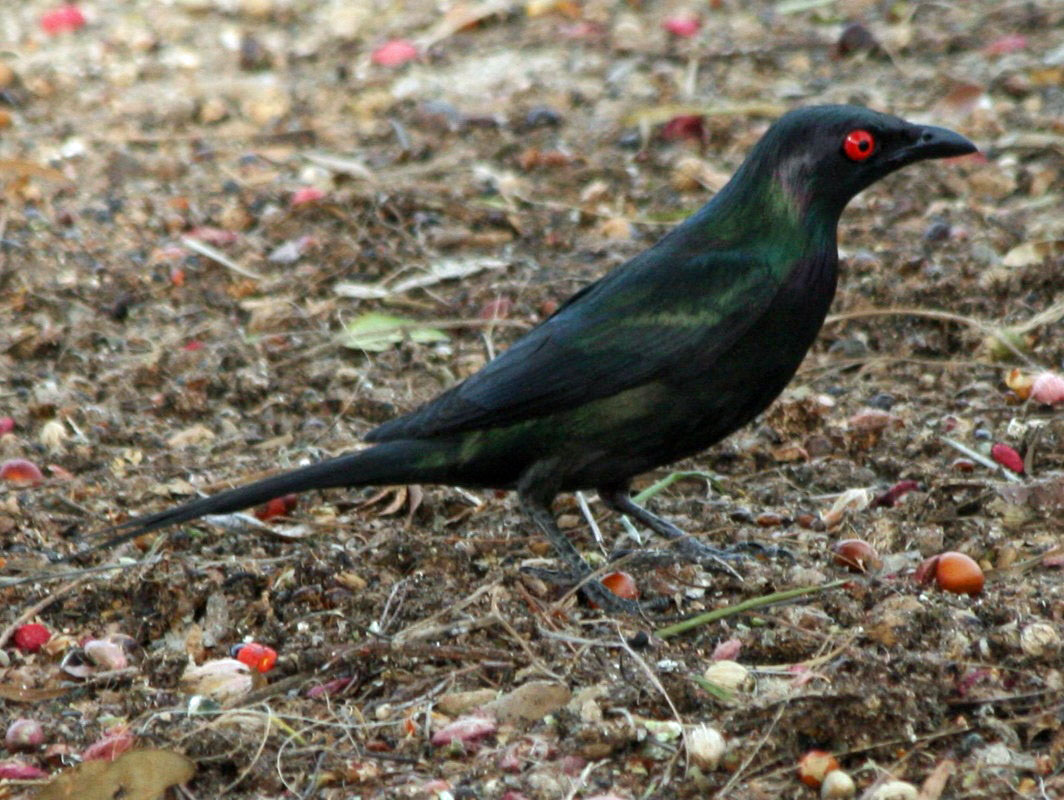
Cairns
