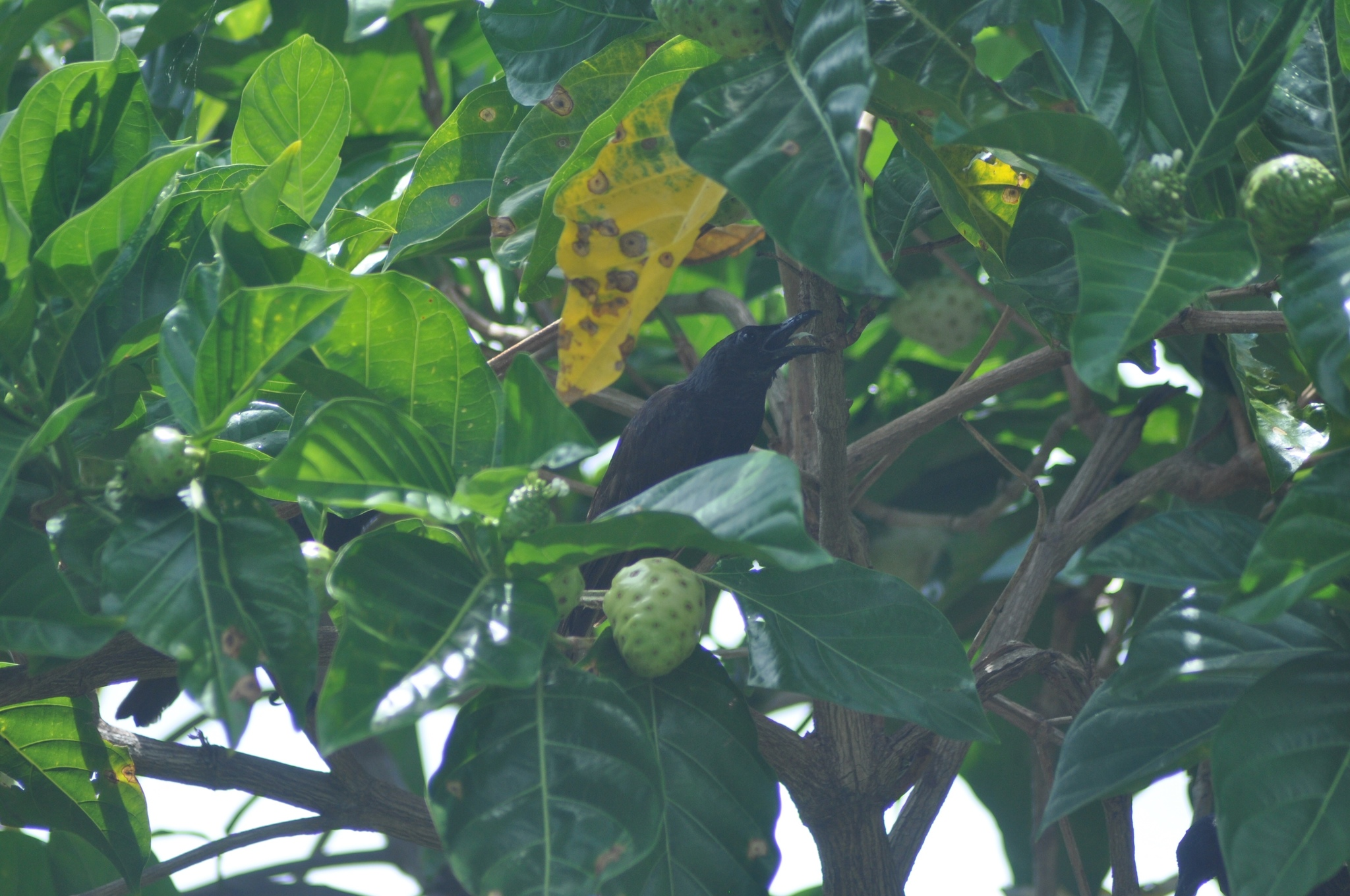

Conservation status
- Least Concern (IUCN 3.1)

Scientific classification
- Kingdom: Animalia
- Phylum: Chordata
- Class: Aves
- Order: Passeriformes
- Family: Sturnidae
- Genus: Aplonis
- Species: A. atrifusca

Binomial name
- Aplonis atrifusca (Peale, 1849)

= Samoan starling =

Species of bird

The Samoan starling (Aplonis atrifusca) (Fuiʻa) is a large starling of the family Sturnidae. It is found in the Samoan Islands. The species has a dark brown, glossy appearance, with violent-green iridescence on the head, neck, and feather-tips and a long bill. Its natural habitat is tropical moist forest on volcanic islands, where it is common and more conspicuous than the Polynesian starling, which is found in the same habitat. Vocalizations include various whistles and other sounds. This starling feeds on a variety of fruits, especially guava, and insects, and has been known to eat lizards. Male and female birds are very similar, there is little sexual dimorphism. Little is known of its mating or social habits, but it appears to nest year-round, in tree cavities. Its eggs are pale blue. Immature birds are dull brown.

Thr bird is common in urban areas, and is beginning to dominate distrubed areas between villages and forest. It is an important pollinator of the liana Freycinetia reinecki.

== Taxonomy ==
The Samoan starling was formally described in 1848 or 1849 by American naturalist Titian Peale in volume VIII of the report of the United States Exploring Expedition. He placed it with the glossy starlings in the genus Lamprotornis and coined the binomial name Lamprotornis atrifusca. He based his description on samples and observations taken during the expedition, and noted that the bird's call was "scarcely entitled to the name of song". The Samoan starling is now placed in the genus Aplonis that was introduced in 1836 by John Gould.
