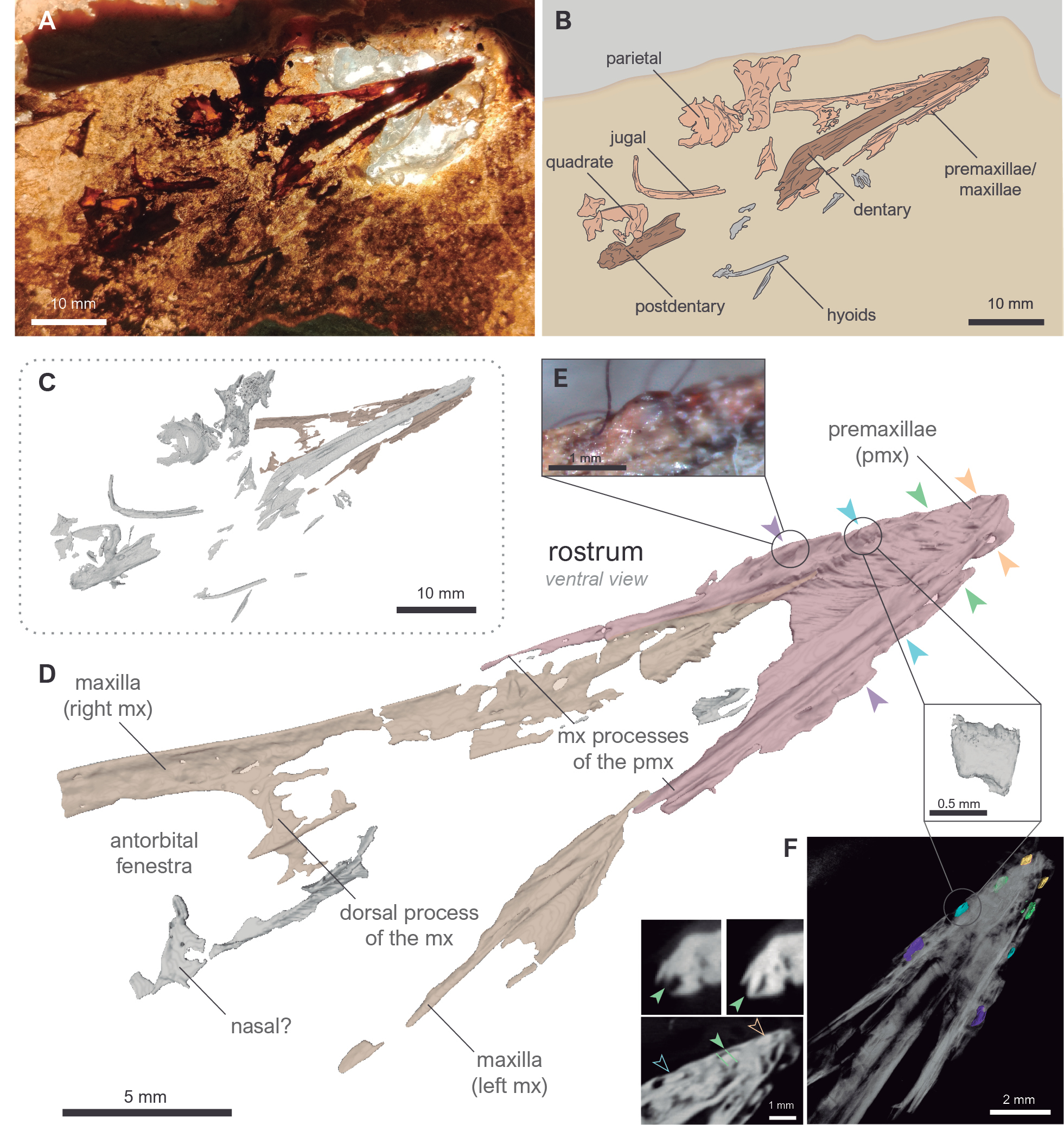
- Holotype specimen

Scientific classification
- Kingdom: Animalia
- Phylum: Chordata
- Class: Reptilia
- Clade: Dinosauria
- Clade: Saurischia
- Clade: Theropoda
- Clade: Avialae
- Clade: †Enantiornithes
- Family: †Longipterygidae (?)
- Genus: †Gorgonavis; Nebreda et al., 2026
- Species: †G. alcyone

Binomial name
- †Gorgonavis alcyone Nebreda et al., 2026

= Gorgonavis =

Gorgonavis Temporal range: Early Cretaceous, 129.4–126.4 Ma

Extinct bird genus

Gorgonavis (lit. 'Gorgon bird') is an extinct genus of enantiornithean bird known from the Early Cretaceous Calizas de La Huérguina Formation of Spain. The genus contains a single species, Gorgonavis alcyone, known from a partial skull. This specimen is the first instance of non-juvenile cranial bones of an avialan found in the Early Cretaceous of Europe. Gorgonavis likely belongs to the family Longipterygidae, otherwise definitively known only from China.

== Discovery and naming ==
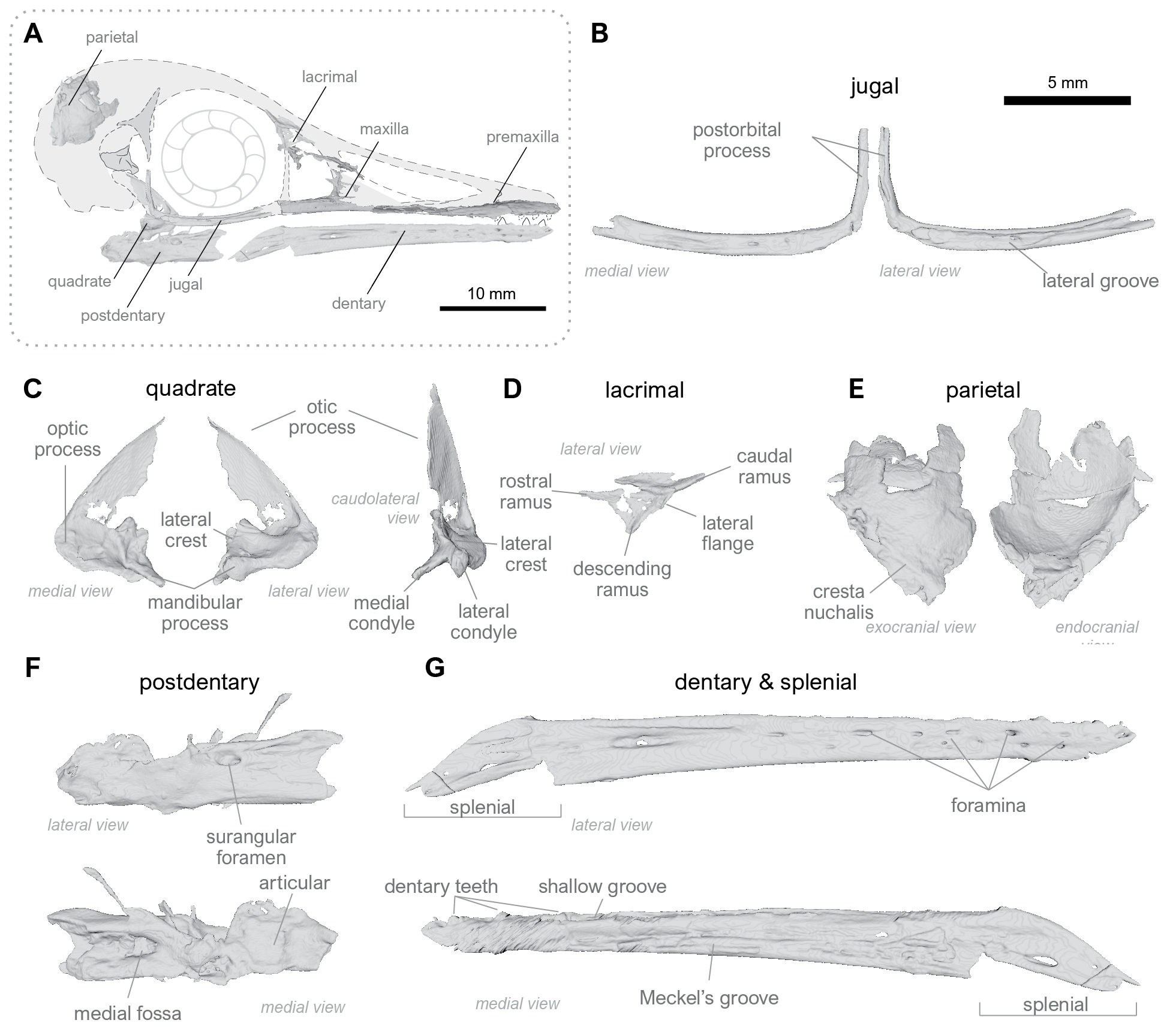
Skull bones of G. alcyone

The Gorgonavis fossil material was discovered at the Las Hoyas fossil site, representing outcrops of the Calizas de La Huérguina Formation, in Cuenca, Spain. This locality is known for preserving the most diverse assemblage of fossil birds outside of China, with the fellow enantiornitheans Concornis, Eoalulavis, and Iberomesornis also having been named. The specimen is housed in the Museo Paleontológico de Castilla-La Mancha, where it is permanently accessioned as specimen MUPA-LH-13240. The specimen consists of an isolated partial skull, comprising the rostrum (snout region), mandible, and part of the braincase.

In 2026, Sergio M. Nebreda and colleagues described Gorgonavis alcyone as a new genus and species of enantiornithean based on these fossil remains, establishing MUPA-LH-13240 as the holotype specimen. The generic name, Gorgonavis, references the Gorgons of Ancient Greek mythology who could turn those who looked at them to stone, specifically Medusa, who was beheaded by Perseus, reminiscent of the preservation of only an isolated skull for this species. This is combined with the Latin word avis, meaning 'bird'. The specific name, alcyone, is the name of another figure in Greek mythology who was transformed into a kingfisher, a type of bird with an elongated rostrum similar to this species and other longipterygids.

== Description and classification ==
=== Anatomy ===
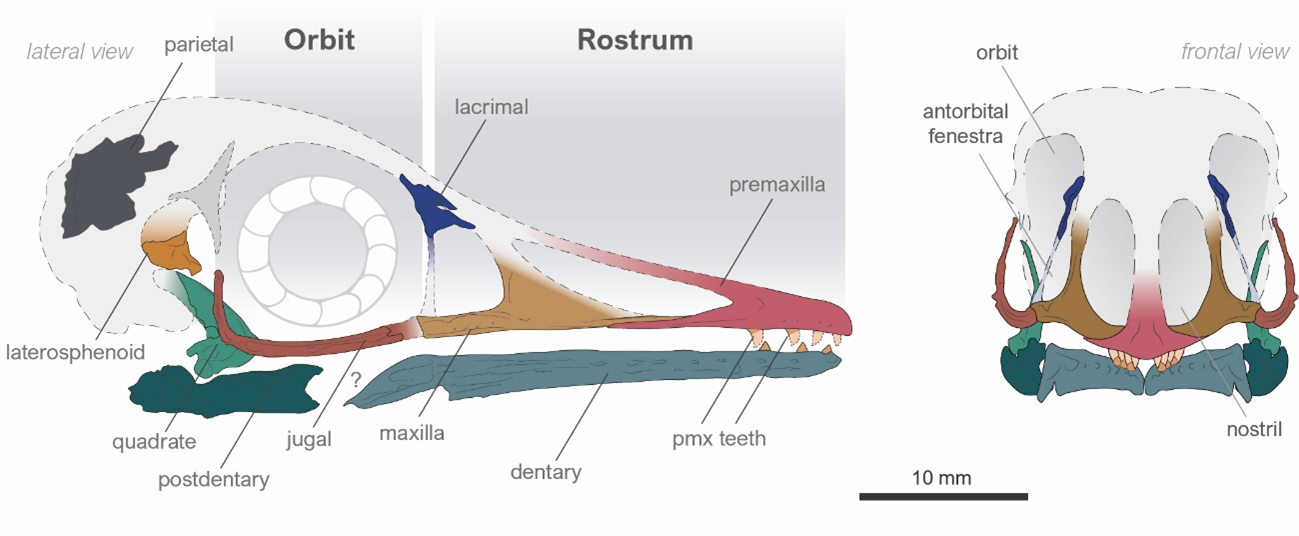
Reconstructed skull of Gorgonavis with known material colored

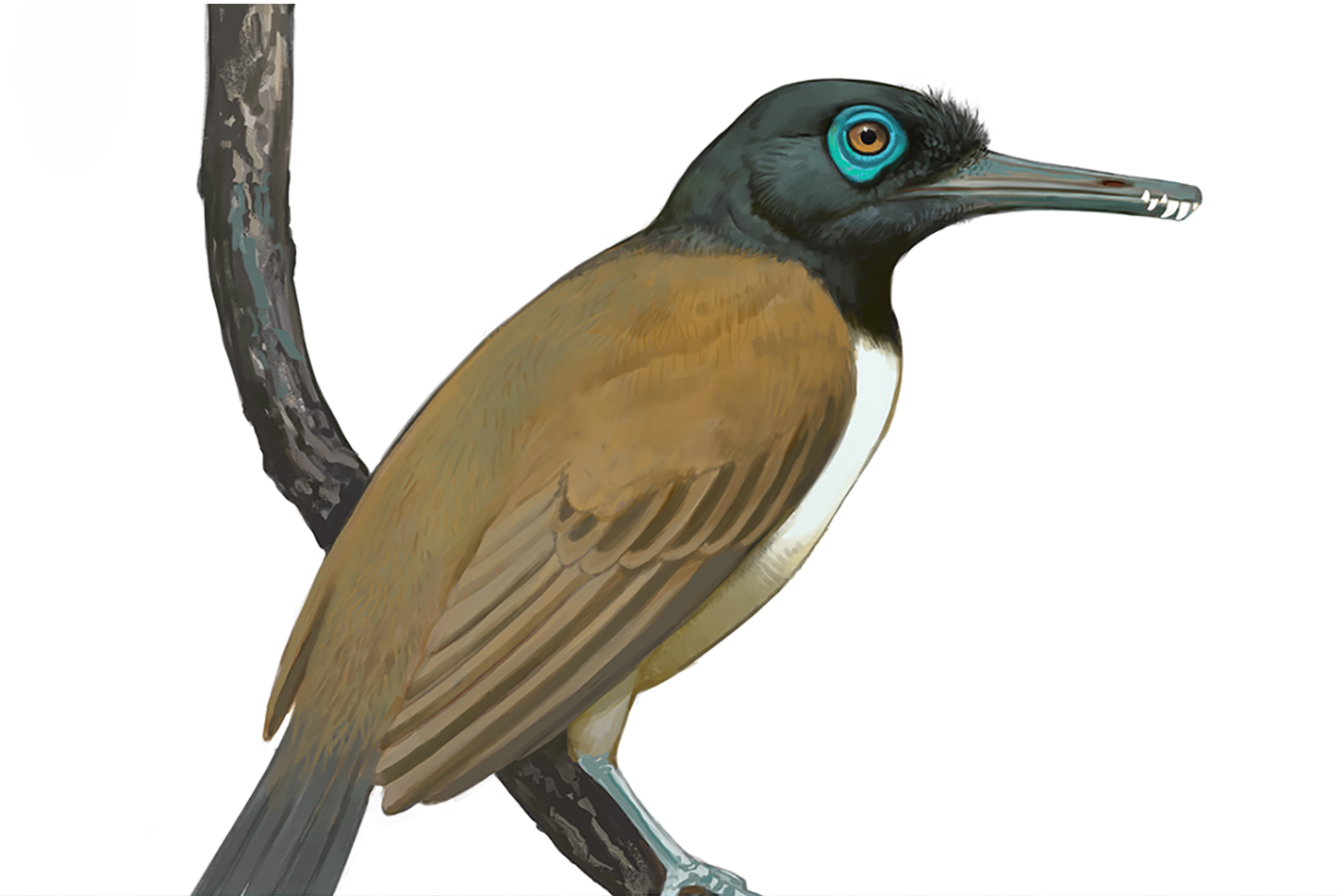
Life restoration of the closely related Longipteryx

The holotype skull of Gorgonavis is estimated to be around 3 centimetres (1.2 in) long. The individual bones of this specimen are visibly fused, indicating this individual was likely skeletally mature when it died. Various anatomical characters of the skull are consistent with the enantiornithean family Longipterygidae, which is traditionally split into two subfamilies: Longipteryginae and Longirostravinae. Gorgonavis has a unique combination of traits seen in both of these families, making its precise classification somewhat tentative. Three or four pairs of teeth are present in the premaxilla, typical for enantiornitheans. Like in longipterygids, these teeth are restricted to the front half of this bone, and the maxilla appears to be edentulous (toothless). The maxillary process of the premaxilla is expanded backward, similar to the longipterygine Longipteryx. The jugal is particularly distinct; the process that articulates with the postorbital is unusually long and is oriented directly dorsally (upwards), forming a ~90° angle with the base of the bone. The rostrum is substantially elongated, characteristic of longipterygids, at about two-and-a-half times the orbit length. The rostrum:orbit proportions are similar to Longipteryx, although the skull's actual size is more similar to the longirostravine Shanweiniao. Much of the mandible (lower jaw) is preserved in the holotype. Like the upper jaw, there are only three visible pairs of teeth in the dentary, restricted to the front of the snout. These teeth are comparatively small, more similar to longirostravines than longipterygines. The dentary is straight (more similar to Shanweiniao than Longipteryx) and long. Both the maxilla and dentary exhibit rows of nutrient foramina.

The rock layers of the Calizas de La Huérguina Formation date to 129.4 to 126.4 million years ago, making Gorgonavis the oldest entantiornithean known with a substantially elongated rostrum. All other definitive longipterygids are known from the Jehol Biota of China—either from the slightly more recent Yixian Formation, which dates to 124.6 million years ago, or the even younger Jiufotang Formation, dating to 122 to 120 million years ago.

=== Phylogeny ===
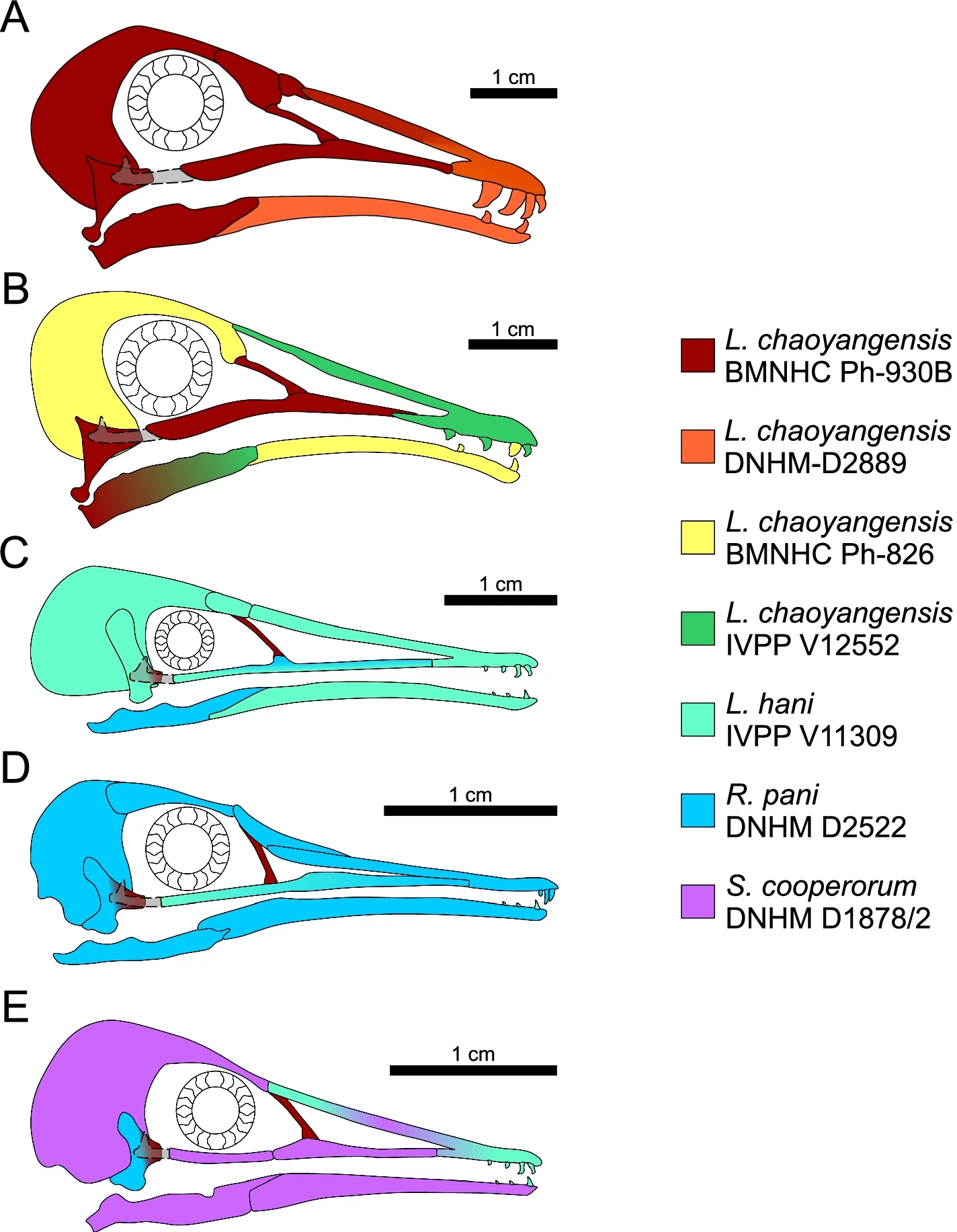
Reconstructed skulls of several longipterygids, illustrating their characteristic elongate snouts

To test the relationships and affinities of Gorgonavis with other Mesozoic birds, Nebreda and colleagues (2026) included it in the phylogenetic matrices of Benito et al. (2022) and Chiappe et al. (2024). Both datasets placed Gorgonavis as a member of the Enantiornithes, in the family Longipterygidae, with the latter finding generally improved resolution for broader enantiornithean relationships. Both placed Gorgonavis in a clade also including Longipteryx, with the former also placing Boluochia (not tested in the latter dataset) in this clade, in an unresolved polytomy. The results of the latter analyses are displayed in the cladogram below. Nebreda et al. (2026) treated a longipterygid placement for Gorgonavis with caution, given that many of the synapomorphies (shared traits) of this group are in the postcranial skeleton, which is not preserved in this taxon. The relationships of Gorgonavis with other longipterygids is further complicated by the mosaic of traits characteristic of either longipterygines or longirostravines.

- Ornithothoraces
  - Euornithes
  - †Enantiornithes
    - Protopteryx
    - - - Eopengornis
        - Parapengornis
      - - Shenqiornis
        - - Orienantius
          - - - CUGB P1202
                (indeterminate unnamed enantiornithean)
              - - - Elsornis
                  - Eoenantiornis
                - - Vescornis
                  - - Fortunguavis
                    - Pengornis
            - - - - Gretcheniao
                  - Junornis
                - - Sulcavis
                  - - Zhouornis
                    - - Longusunguis
                      - - Bohaiornis
                        - - Parabohaiornis
                          - Qiliania
              - - Longipterygidae
                  - Longipteryginae
                    - Gorgonavis
                    - Longipteryx
                  - Longirostravinae
                    - Shanweiniao
                    - - Longirostravis
                      - Rapaxavis
                - - Cathayornis
                  - Concornis
                  - Eoalulavis
                  - Eocathayornis
                  - Iberomesornis
                  - - Gobipteryx
                    - - Navaornis
                      - - Neuquenornis
                        - Yuornis

Las Hoyas taxa
