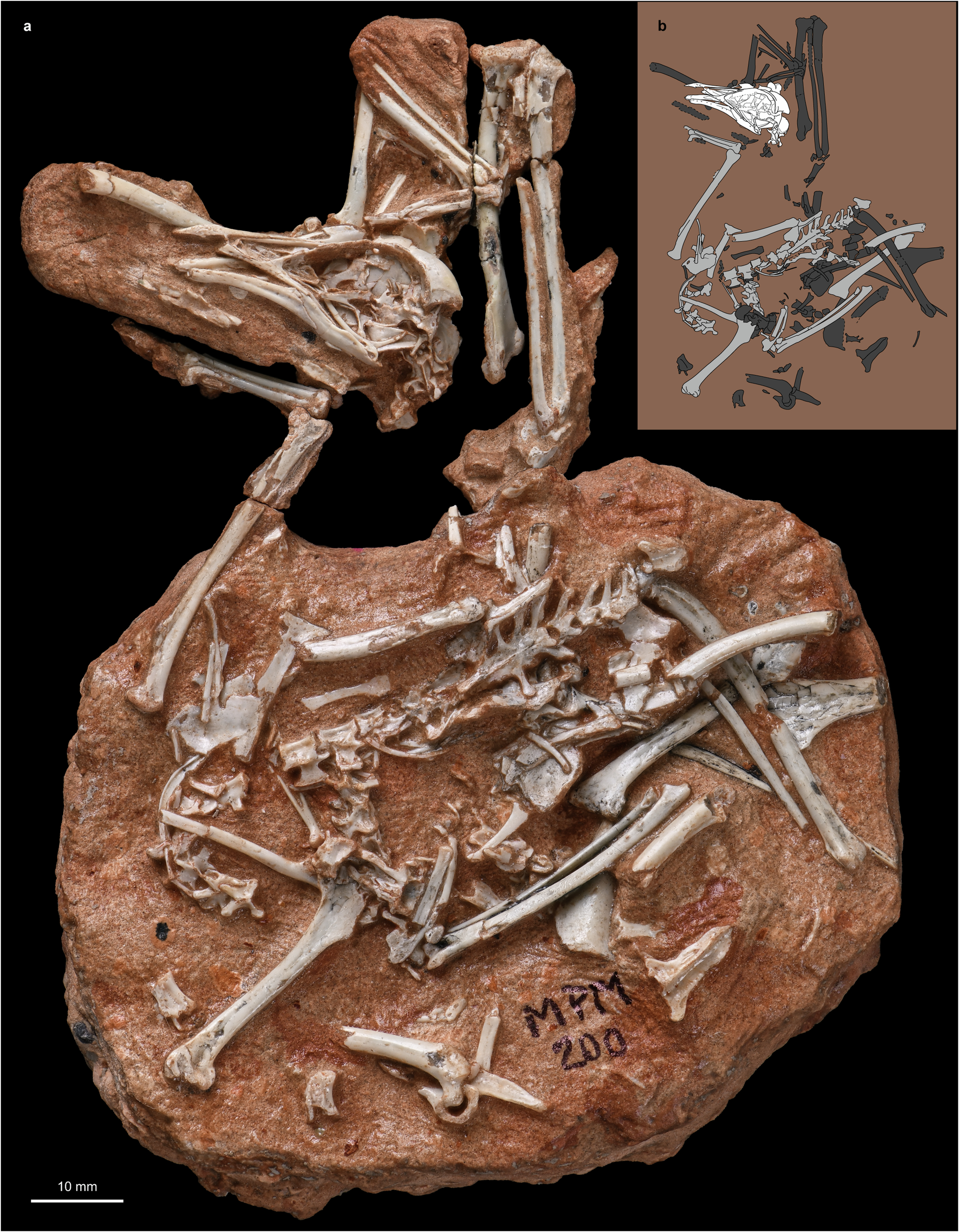
- Fossil material of Navaornis (white and light grey in "b") and an unnamed specimen (dark grey)

Scientific classification
- Kingdom: Animalia
- Phylum: Chordata
- Class: Reptilia
- Clade: Dinosauria
- Clade: Saurischia
- Clade: Theropoda
- Clade: Avialae
- Clade: †Enantiornithes
- Genus: †Navaornis; Chiappe et al., 2024
- Species: †N. hestiae

Binomial name
- †Navaornis hestiae Chiappe et al., 2024

= Navaornis =

Navaornis Temporal range: Late Cretaceous (late Santonian–early Campanian), 85–75 Ma

Genus of enantiornithine birds

Navaornis is an extinct genus of enantiornithean birds from the Late Cretaceous Adamantina Formation of Brazil. The genus contains a single species, N. hestiae, known from a well preserved skull and skeleton.

== Discovery and naming ==
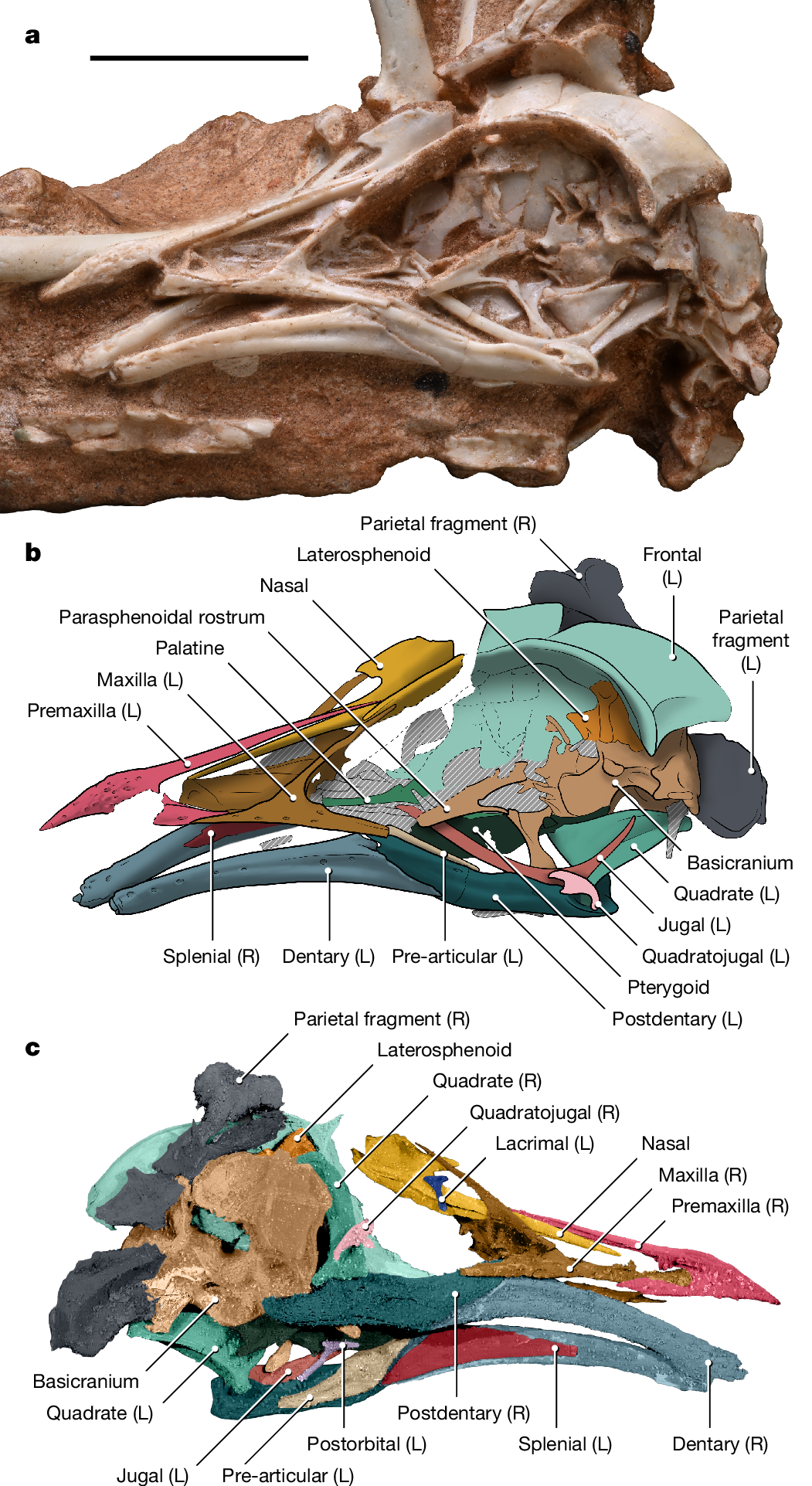
Preserved holotype skull and diagram

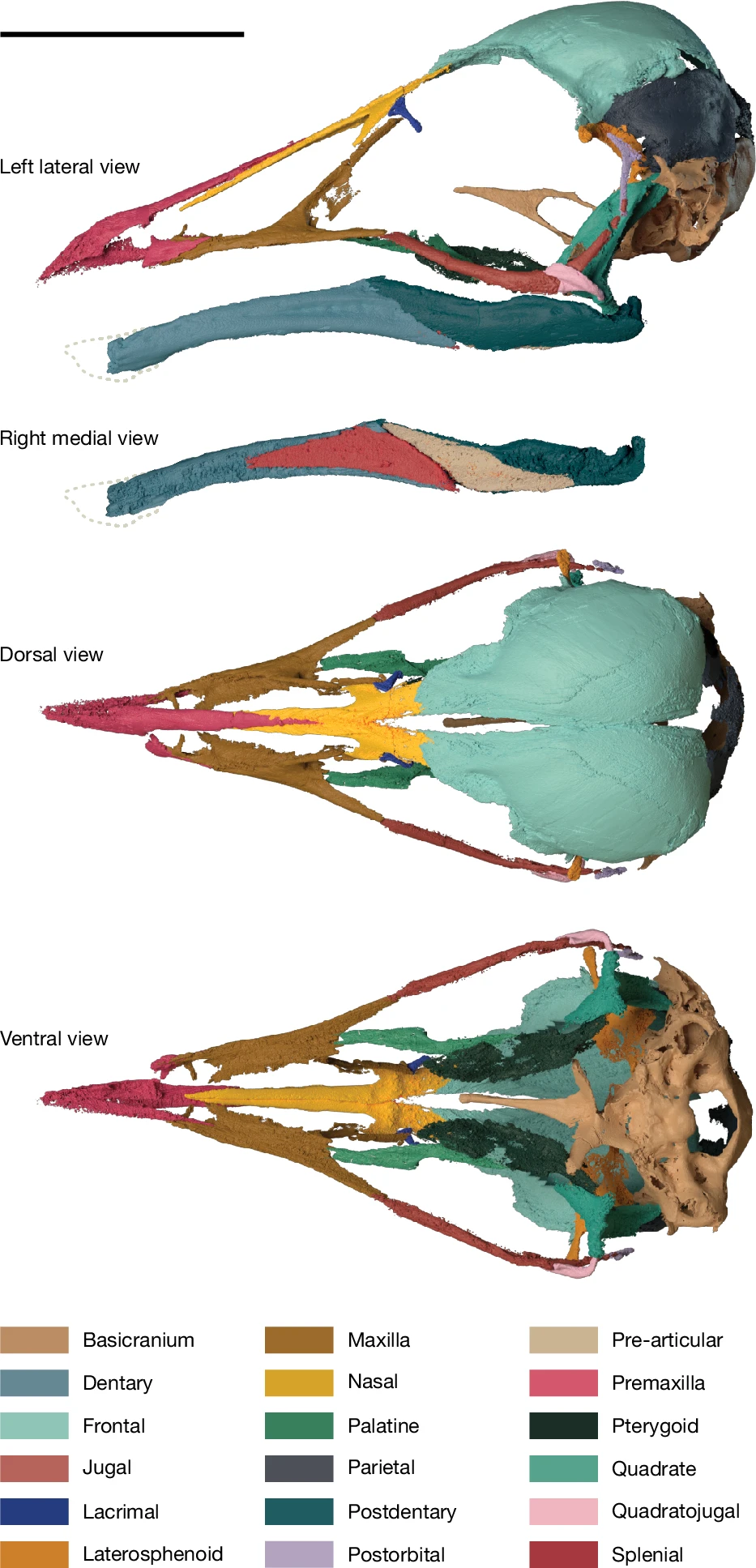
Three-dimensional cranial reconstruction of Navaornis

The Navaornis fossil material was discovered in 2016 in sediments of the Adamantina Formation ('William's Quarry' bonebed, Bauru Group) in São Paulo State, southeastern Brazil. The holotype specimen comprises a complete skull with an associated postcranial skeleton. A single basicranium described in 2022 was also referred to Navaornis based on its similarities with the holotype.

In 2024, Chiappe et al. described Navaornis hestiae as a new genus and species of enantiornithean birds based on these fossil remains. The generic name, Navaornis, combines "Nava"—honoring William Nava, the discoverer of the holotype and type locality—with the Greek word "ornis", meaning "bird". The specific name, hestiae, references the Greek goddess Hestia, who is considered to be both the oldest and youngest Olympian—similar to the archaic phylogenetic position of Navaornis combined with its modern skull morphology.

== Classification ==
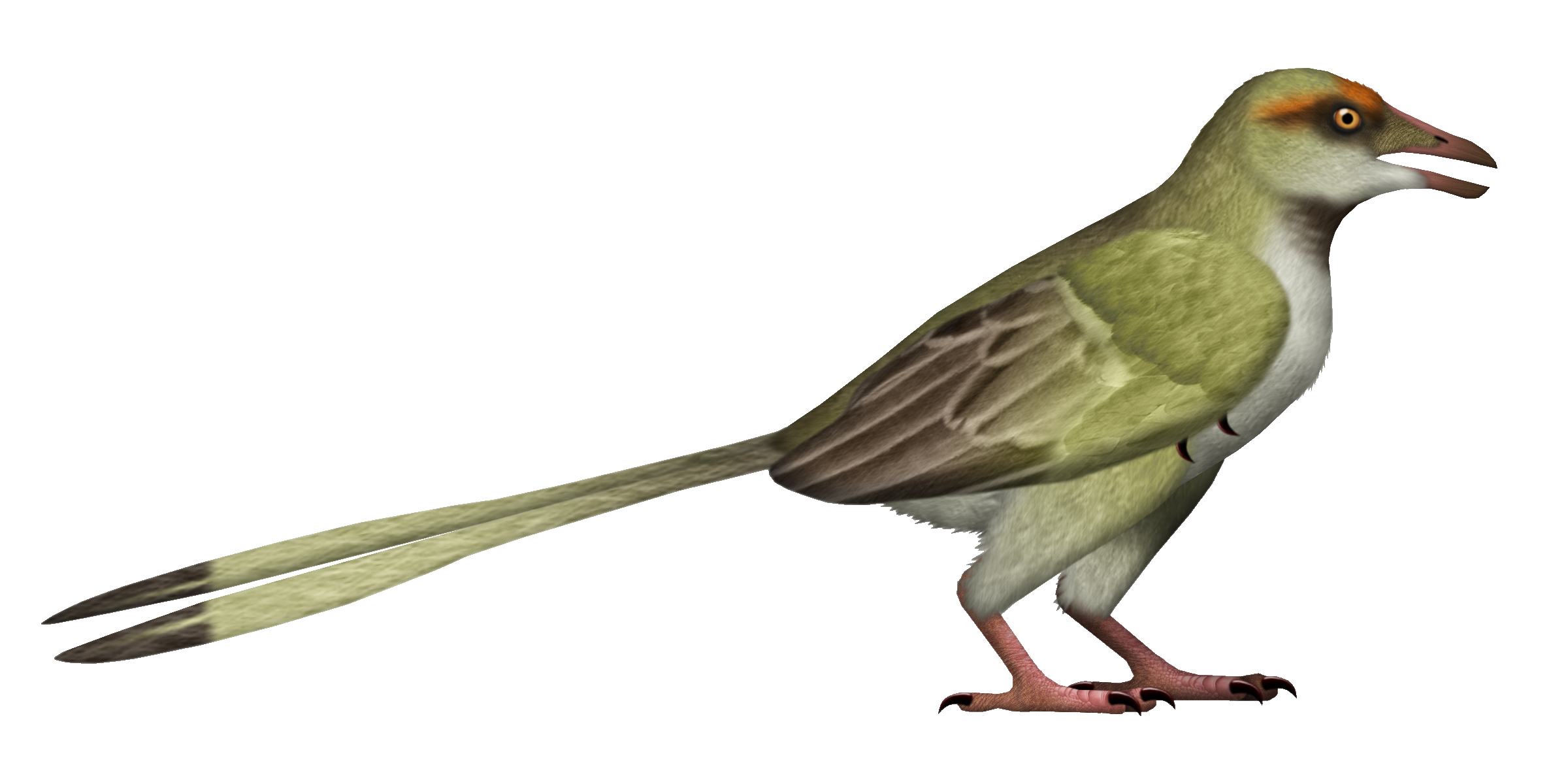
Speculative life restoration

In their phylogenetic analyses, Chiappe et al. (2024) recovered Navaornis as a derived member of the extinct Cretaceous bird clade Enantiornithes, clustering with Yuornis and Gobipteryx, two other edentulous birds with beaks. However, they noted that due to the low support for specific enantiornithean relationships, this grouping may not represent a legitimate toothless clade. Their results are displayed in the cladogram below:

- Enantiornithes
  - Protopteryx
  - - Orienantius
    - - - Eopengornis
        - Parapengornis
      - - Shenqiornis
        - - - - Junornis
              - Gretcheniao
            - - Sulcavis
              - - Zhouornis
                - - Longusunguis
                  - - Bohaiornis
                    - - Qiliania
                      - Parabohaiornis
          - - - Vescornis
              - - Neuquenornis
                - Pengornis
            - - Eoenantiornis
              - - CUGB P1202
                  (indeterminate unnamed enantiornithean)
                - - - - Concornis
                      - - Elsornis
                        - Longipteryx
                    - - Shanweiniao
                      - - Longirostravis
                        - Rapaxavis
                  - - Fortunguavis
                    - - Iberomesornis
                      - - Eoalulavis
                        - - - Cathayornis
                            - Eocathayornis
                          - - Gobipteryx
                            - - Yuornis
                              - Navaornis
