= Eocathayornis =

Eocathayornis Temporal range: Early Cretaceous, 120 Ma

Scientific classification
- Kingdom: Animalia
- Phylum: Chordata
- Class: Reptilia
- Clade: Dinosauria
- Clade: Saurischia
- Clade: Theropoda
- Clade: Avialae
- Clade: †Enantiornithes
- Genus: †Eocathayornis; Zhou, 2002
- Species: †E. walkeri

Binomial name
- †Eocathayornis walkeri Zhou, 2002

Genus of birds (fossil)

Eocathayornis is a genus of enantiornithean birds that was probably more basal or "primitive" than related genera Sinornis and Cathayornis. These birds lived during the Early Cretaceous in today's People's Republic of China.

The holotype IVPP 10916 was in 1994 found in the Boluochi quarry by Zhou Zhonghe in a layer of the Jiufotang Formation dating from the late Aptian. It consists of the skull and the top half of the postcranial skeleton on a plate and counterplate. The bones have only been preserved as impressions. In 2002, Zhou named and described the type species Eocathayornis walkeri. The generic name combines a Greek ἠώς, eos, "dawn", with Cathayornis, referring to the more basal build compared to the latter genus. The specific name honours Cyril Alexander Walker for his contributions to the study of the Enantiornithes.

== Relationships ==
Zhou in 2002 placed Eocathayornis in the Cathayornithidae. Jingmai O'Connor and colleagues in their 2025 analysis of Chromeornis and the Longipterygidae incidentially found Eocathayornis to be markedly more ancestral than Cathayornis, and instead of belonging to the Cathayornithidae embedded within the basal lineages of Bohaiornithidae, perhaps particularly close to Junornis. A 2014 analysis focusing on Bohaiornithidae but containing fewer taxa overall had not proposed such a relationship, nor did the much larger 2026 study of Nebreda et al. describing the suspected longipterygid Gorgonavis.

In all three of these more recent studies, the position of Eocathayornis, Sulcavis (and probably Shenqiornis), and Eoenantiornis was notably labile, varying between a close affiliation with Bohaiornithidae and a more basal (and possibly close to Pengornithidae) or advanced position, depending on whether taxa such as Concornis, Navaornis, Neobohaiornis, or one or both of Fortunguavis and Vescornis, were included. All those studies agree, however, that Eocathayornis is close to but does not belong in Longipterygidae or Pengornithidae, and only the 2026 analysis does not reject a placement of Eocathayornis close to or within (instead of distinctly basal to) Cathayornithidae. While the 2024 description of Navaornis did support a Cathayornis-Eocathayornis clade, this analysis was a less-comprehensive version of the 2026 Gorgonavis study. Despite Cathayornis and Eocathayornis both being known from the Jiufotang Formation, the more recent studies thus favor the slightly older (Barremian, 125 mya) Concornis and/or Eoalulavis from Spain as at least as closely related to Cathayornis as Eocathayornis was, if not much closer.

The most comprehensive analysis of Bohaiornithidae as of 2026, in the description of Plumadraco, resulted in this genus displacing Eocathayornis (and Shenqiornis) out of that family, with Eocathayornis resolving as close to Cathayornis, Eoalulavis, and especially Iberomesornis (also from Barremian Spain). In the first regard, this is in line with the Navaornis and Gorgonavis studies, whereas a Eocathayornis-Iberomesornis sister relationship is more unusual. While the less comprehensive Navaornis dataset only supports a general relationship between them, and the Chromeornis and 2014 Bohaiornithidae studies don't find any closer relationship at all, the 2026 updated Gorgonavis dataset places both (and Cathayornis and Eoalulavis, as well as the Late Cretaceous Gobipteryx from Mongolia some 70 mya) in a sizeable but little-resolved largely polytomous clade. The 2026 Bohaiornithidae analysis, on the other hand, only achieves good resolution in its core taxon, and fails to recover the usually well-supported Longipterygidae and Pengornithidae. These are instead dispersed around the Bohaiornithidae, with the Cathayornis clade of the Gorgonavis study mixed into them. Thus, all that can be said so far is that the Longipterygidae and Pengornithidae, as well as Bohaiornithidae and Cathayornis, appear to form a close-knit radiation that also includes Eocathayornis, at least some of the Spanish Barremian lineages, and possibly the much younger Gobipteryx. Within this radiation, the latter three are more likely closer to either or both of Bohaiornithidae and Cathayornis than to the Longipterygidae and Pengornithidae. And while Cathayornis, Iberomesornis and Junornis have all been proposed as closest known relatives of Eocathayornis by some recent cladistic analysis or another, each of these hypotheses is strongly rejected by other recent cladistic analyses, and no such analyses has so far included all the lineages required for resolving the fundamental relationships of this large, early and widespread radiation of Euenantiornithes which thrived for up to 50 million years or even more, and which – though its precise circumscription varies slightly – is well-supported by most recent cladistic analyses.

Note, however, that one very comprehensive analysis of Enantiornithes places the Longipterygidae basal to Euenantiornithes, and Eocathayornis within the latter as one of the most basal lineages and with no obvious identifiable close relatives. Unlike the analyses focusing on Chinese taxa suspected to be closely affiliated with Eocathayornis, the large 2022 analysis focusing on the puzzling "mosaic bird" Musivavis also included several of the American Avisauridae, which break up the apparent clade of advanced Euenantiornithes found in analyses restricted to Eurasian lineages.

Possible close relatives of Eocathayornis

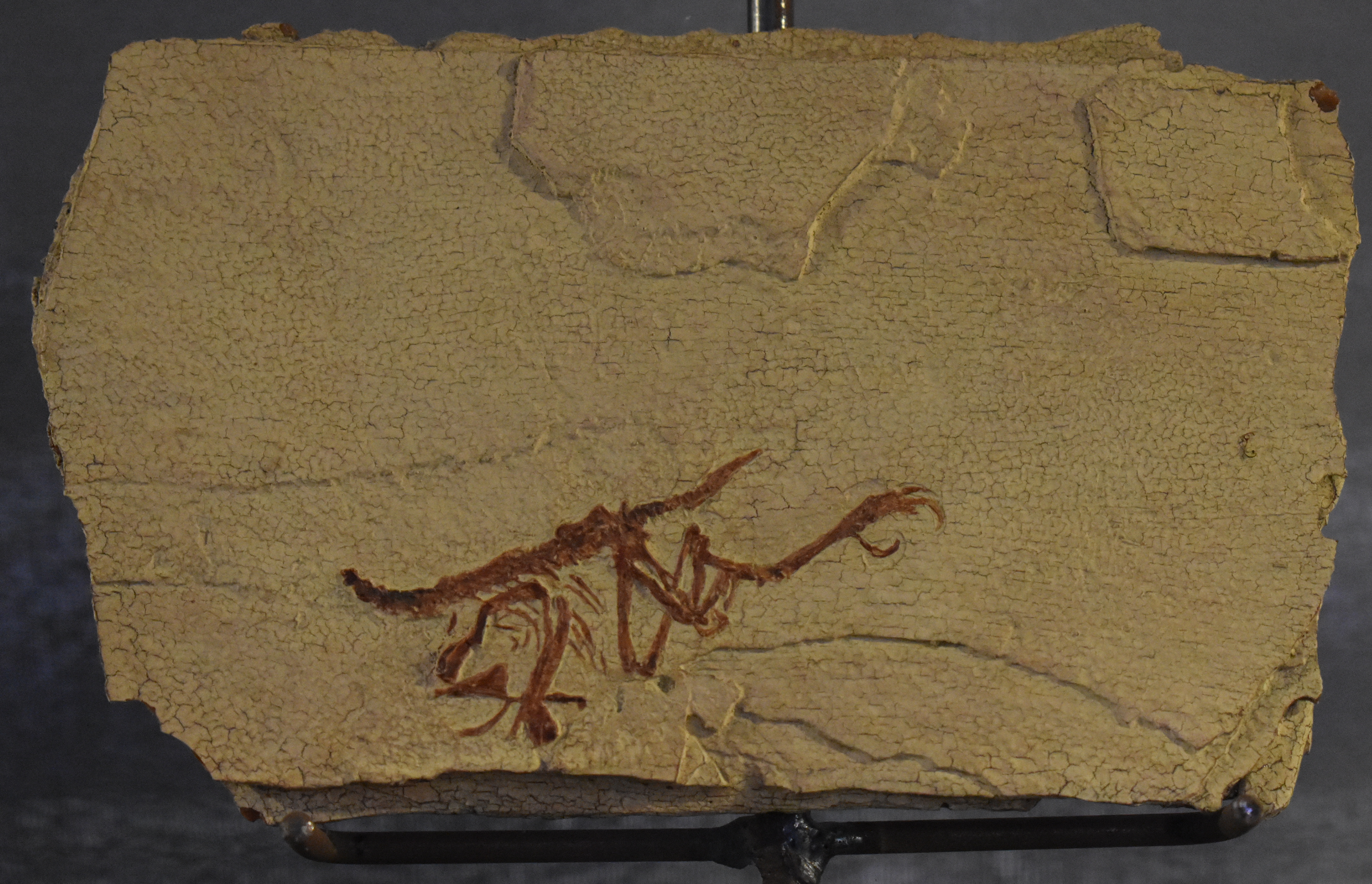
Iberomesornis romerali
Spain, 125 mya

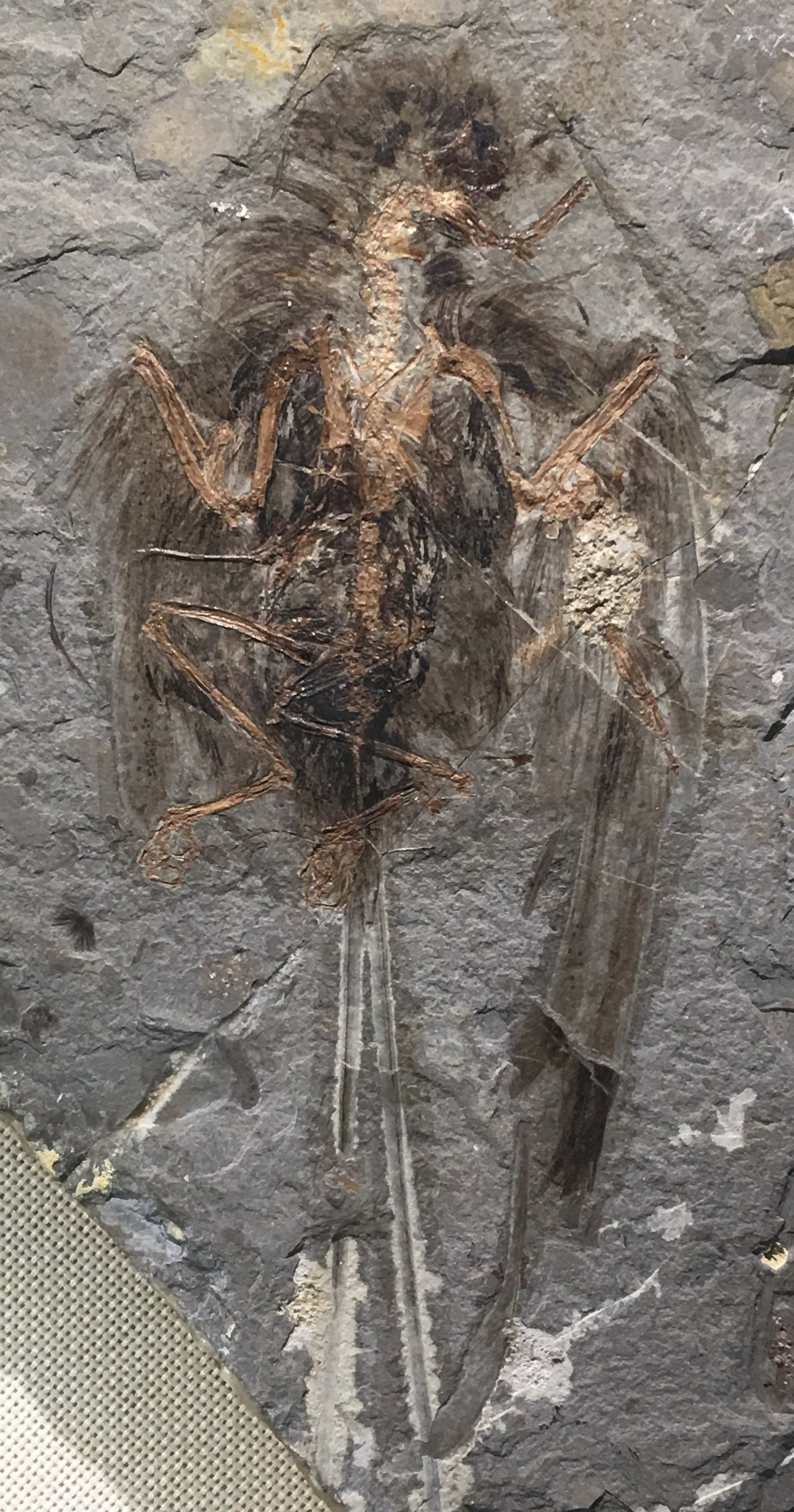
Cathayornis yandica
China, 120 mya

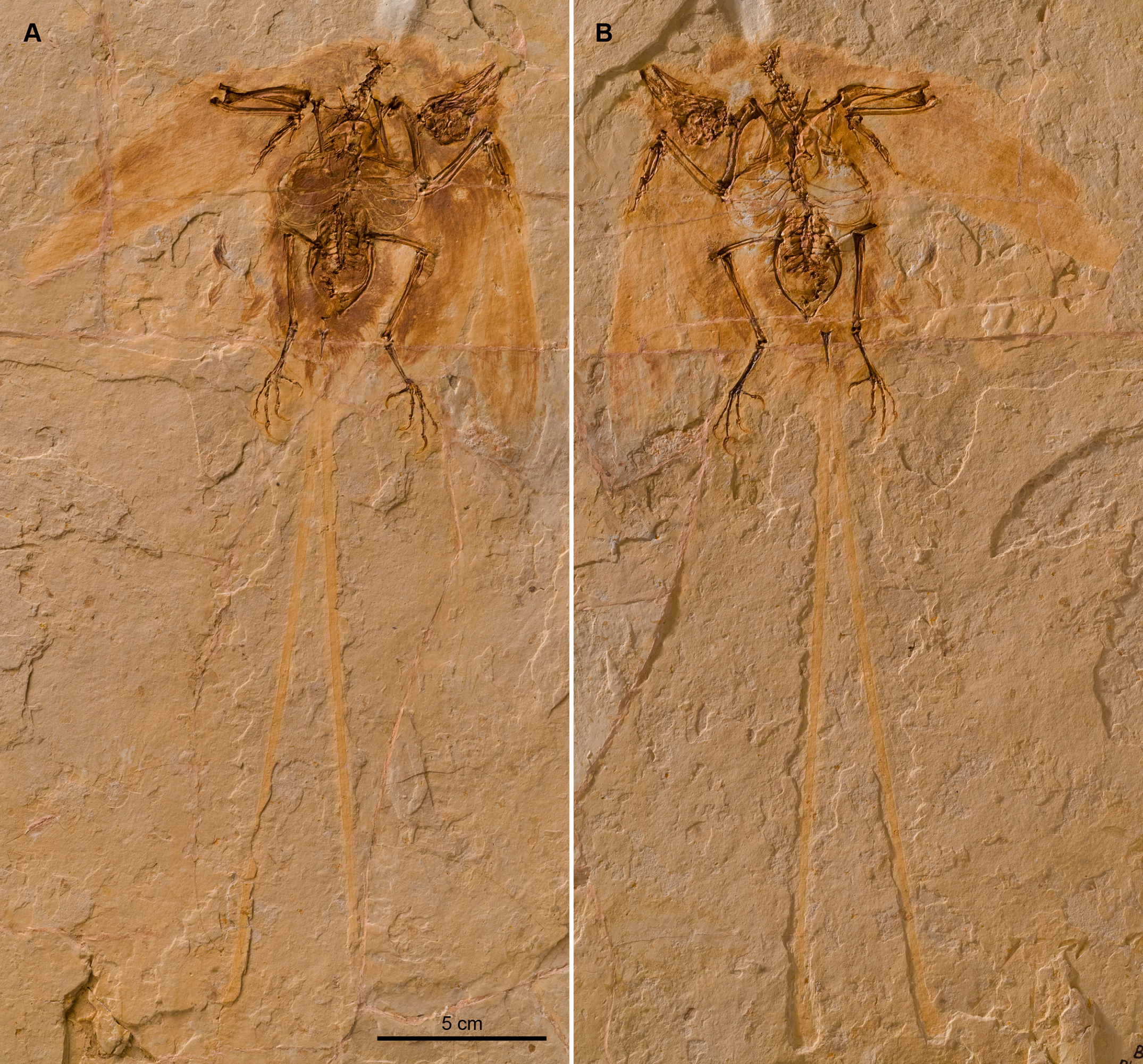
Junornis houi
China, 126 mya
