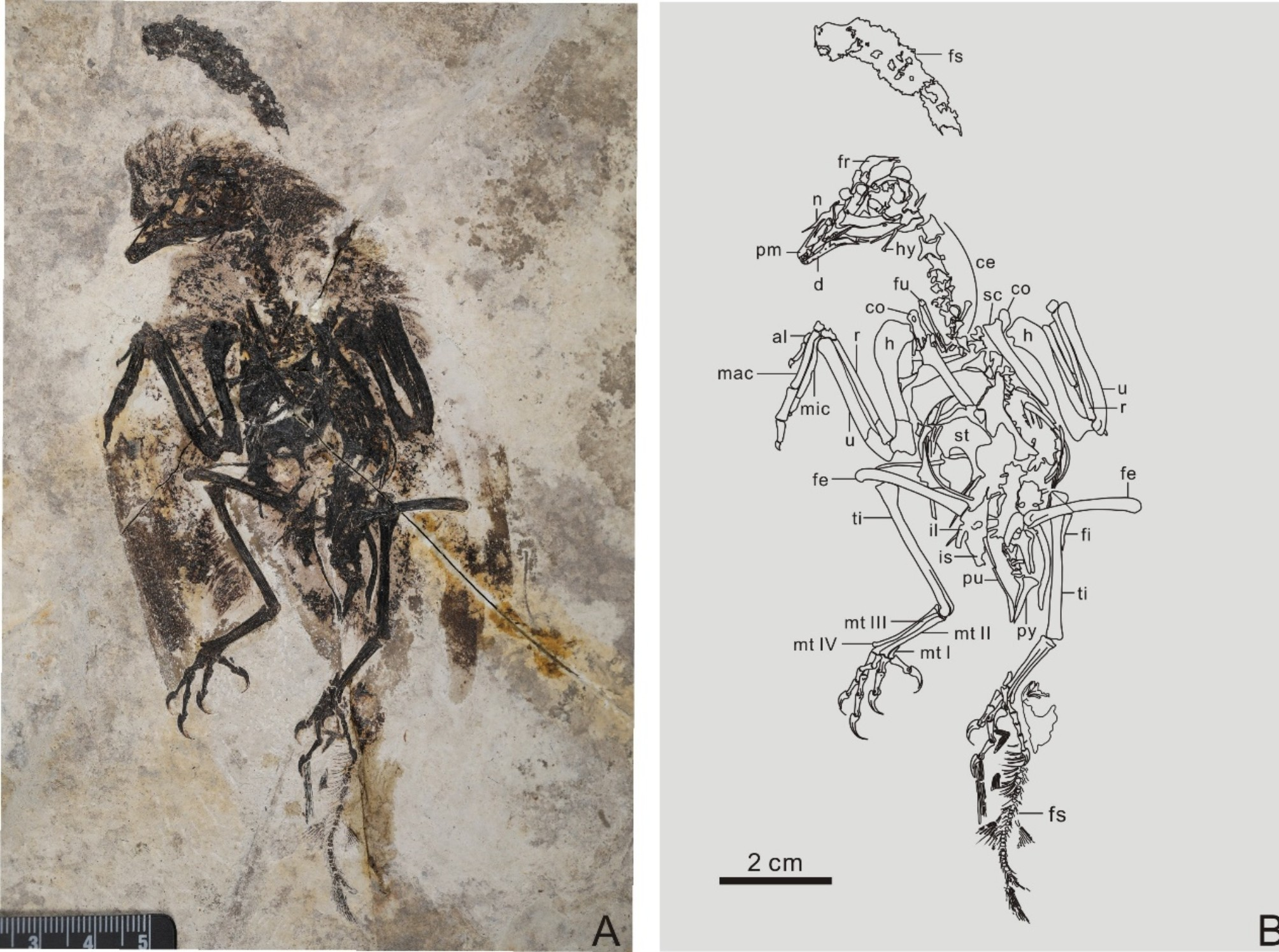
- Holotype specimen and interpretive drawing

Scientific classification
- Kingdom: Animalia
- Phylum: Chordata
- Clade: Dinosauria
- Clade: Saurischia
- Clade: Theropoda
- Clade: Avialae
- Clade: †Enantiornithes
- Family: †Bohaiornithidae
- Genus: †Neobohaiornis; Shen et al., 2024
- Species: †N. lamadongensis

Binomial name
- †Neobohaiornis lamadongensis Shen et al., 2024

= Neobohaiornis =

Neobohaiornis Temporal range: Lower Cretaceous (Aptian), ~119 Ma

Extinct genus of enantiornithean bird

Neobohaiornis is an extinct genus of bohaiornithid enantiornithean bird known from the Early Cretaceous (Aptian-aged) Jiufotang Formation of Liaoning Province, China. The genus contains a single species, N. lamadongensis, known from a well-preserved skeleton with feather impressions.

== Discovery and naming ==
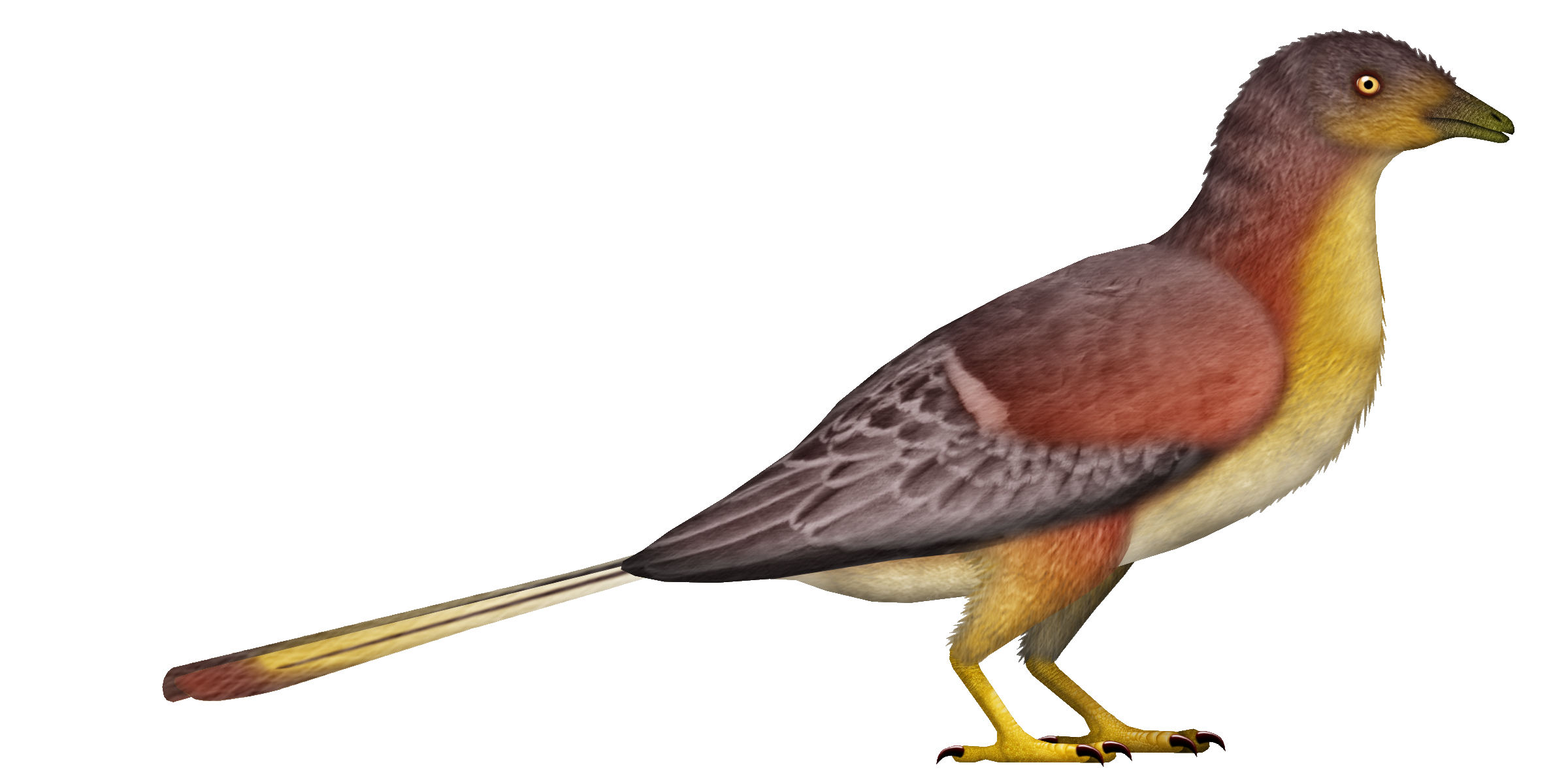
Life restoration

The Neobohaiornis holotype specimen, MHGU-0288, was discovered in sediments of the Jiufotang Formation near Lamadong in Jianchang County of Liaoning Province, northeastern China. The specimen is a nearly complete skeleton preserved in dorsal view. Feather traces are visible around much of the skeleton.

In 2024, Shen et al. described Neobohaiornis lamadongensis as a new genus and species of bohaiornithid birds based on these fossil remains. The generic name, Neobohaiornis, combines the Greek prefix "neo-", meaning "new" with an allusion to the Bohaiornithidae (in turn derived from the Bohai Sea and the Greek word ornis, meaning "bird"). This name references the derived morphology of this taxon compared to other members of the clade. The specific name, lamadongensis, refers to Lamadong, a town near the type locality.

== Description ==
As most of the compound bones are fused in the holotype specimen, this individual was likely fully grown. With a humerus length of 25 millimetres (0.98 in), Neobohaiornis likely had a body mass around 47 grams (0.104 lb). In comparison, the closely related Bohaiornis may have weighed closer to 162.46 grams (0.3582 lb), and all other bohaiornithids are estimated at more than 100 grams (0.22 lb). As such, Neobohaiornis is the smallest known member of the clade. In comparison to other bohaiornithids, Neobohaiornis demonstrates a reduced alular digit and more sacral vertebrae (more than seven).

=== Plumage ===
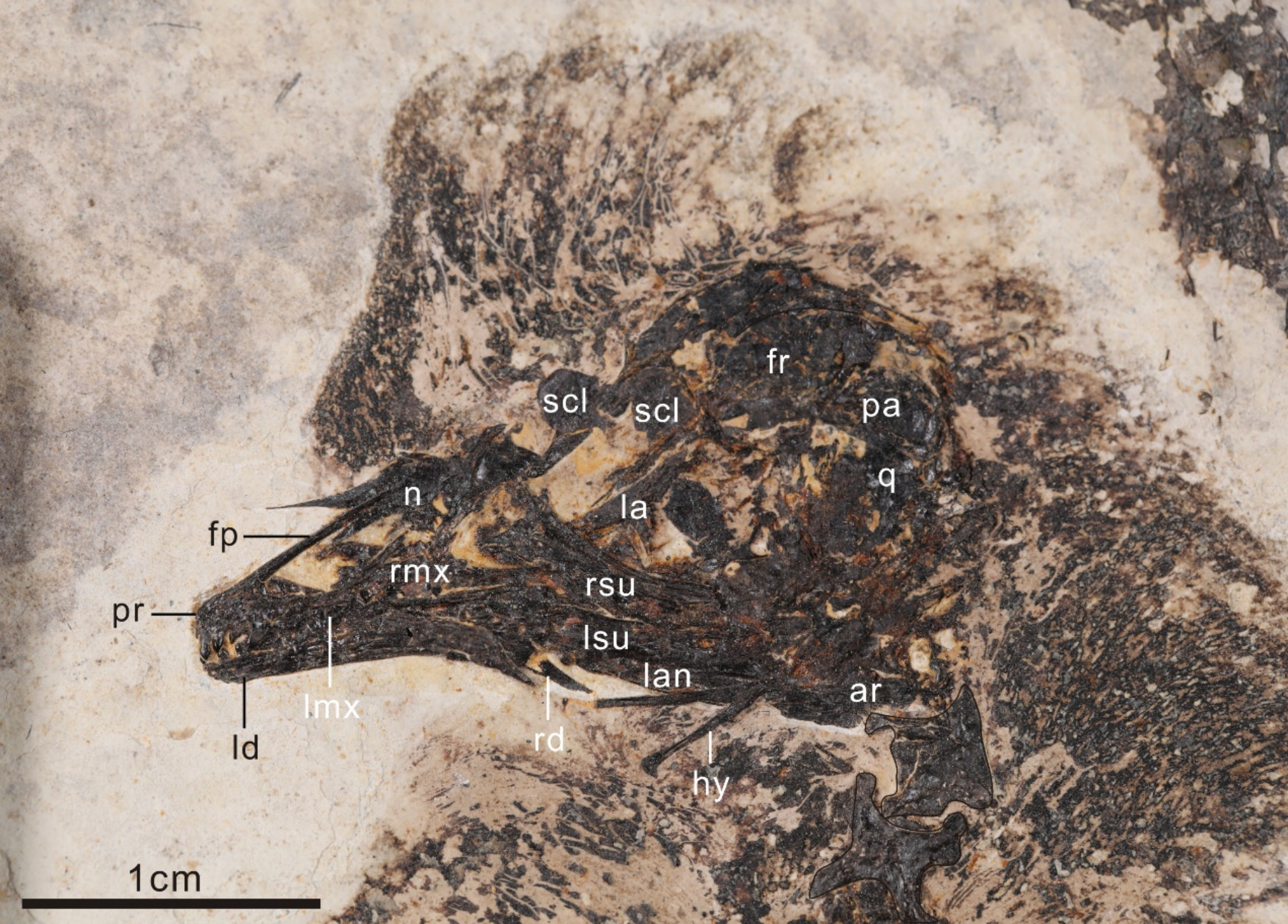
Neobohaiornis skull and associated plumage

The holotype specimen of Neobohaiornis preserved numerous feather traces. The longer raised feathers seen over the head likely did not form a crest, although they superficially resemble this structure. Instead, Shen et al. interpret this as an artifact of post-mortem taphonomic distortion. The primary feathers of the wings are about twice the length of the humerus and their distal margins are rounded. Two long steamer-like feathers are present at the end of the tail, which would have trailed behind a small fan of rectricial tail feathers.

== Classification ==
In their phylogenetic analyses, Shen et al. (2024) recovered Neobohaiornis in an unresolved polytomy with several other members of the enantiornithean family Bohaiornithidae, including Sulcavis, Zhouornis, and an unnamed coeval bohaiornithid. These results are displayed in the cladogram below:

- - Neobohaiornis
  - BMNHC-Ph1204 (unnamed bohaiornithid)
  - Zhouornis
  - Sulcavis
  - - Gretcheniao
    - Junornis
  - - Longusunguis
    - - Parabohaiornis
      - Bohaiornis

In 2026, Clark and colleagues described Plumadraco, another bohaiornithid from the Jiufotang Formation. These researchers used an updated version of the Shen et al. (2024) phylogenetic matrix to test the position of their new taxon, and recovered a better-resolved Bohaiornithidae. Neobohaiornis was placed as the sister taxon to Zhouornis, with Junornis and Gretcheniao as successively more early-diverging taxa. These results are displayed in the cladogram below:

- Bohaiornithidae
  - Gretcheniao
  - - Junornis
    - - - Neobohaiornis
        - Zhouornis
      - - - Sulcavis
          - - Plumadraco
            - CUGB-P1202
        - - BMNHC-Ph1204
          - - Longusunguis
            - - Bohaiornis
              - Parabohaiornis
