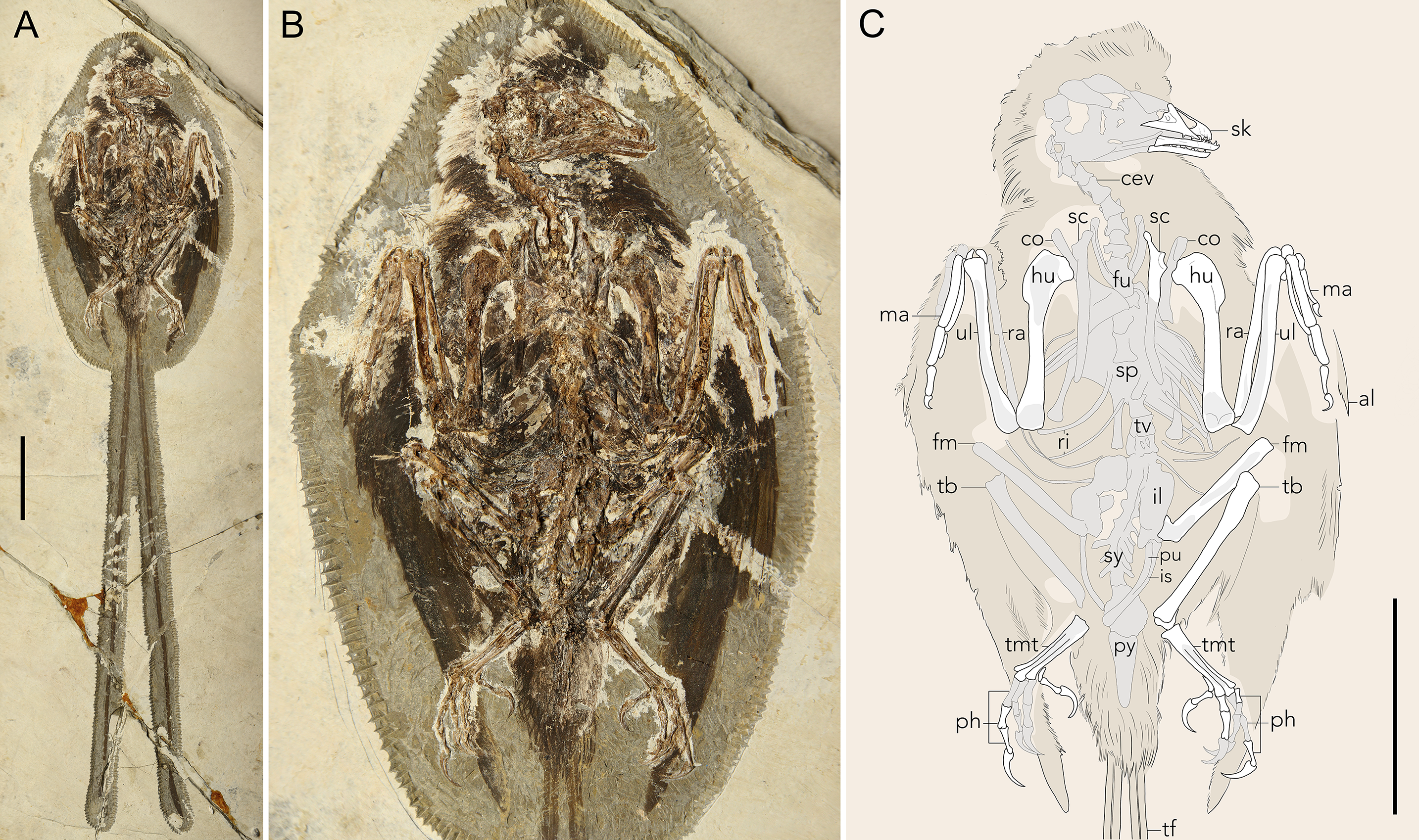
- Holotype specimen (A, B) and interpretive drawing (C)

Scientific classification
- Kingdom: Animalia
- Phylum: Chordata
- Clade: Dinosauria
- Clade: Saurischia
- Clade: Theropoda
- Clade: Avialae
- Clade: †Enantiornithes
- Family: †Bohaiornithidae
- Genus: †Plumadraco; Clark et al., 2026
- Species: †P. bankoorum

Binomial name
- †Plumadraco bankoorum Clark et al., 2026

= Plumadraco =

Plumadraco Temporal range: Early Cretaceous (Aptian), 121 Ma

Extinct bird genus

Plumadraco (lit. 'feather dragon') is an enantiornithean bird in the family Bohaiornithidae, known from the Early Cretaceous (Aptian age) Jiufotang Formation of China. The genus contains a single species, Plumadraco bankoorum, known from a complete skeleton preserving soft tissues. Among the feathers preserved are a pair of elongated tail plumes.

== Discovery and naming ==
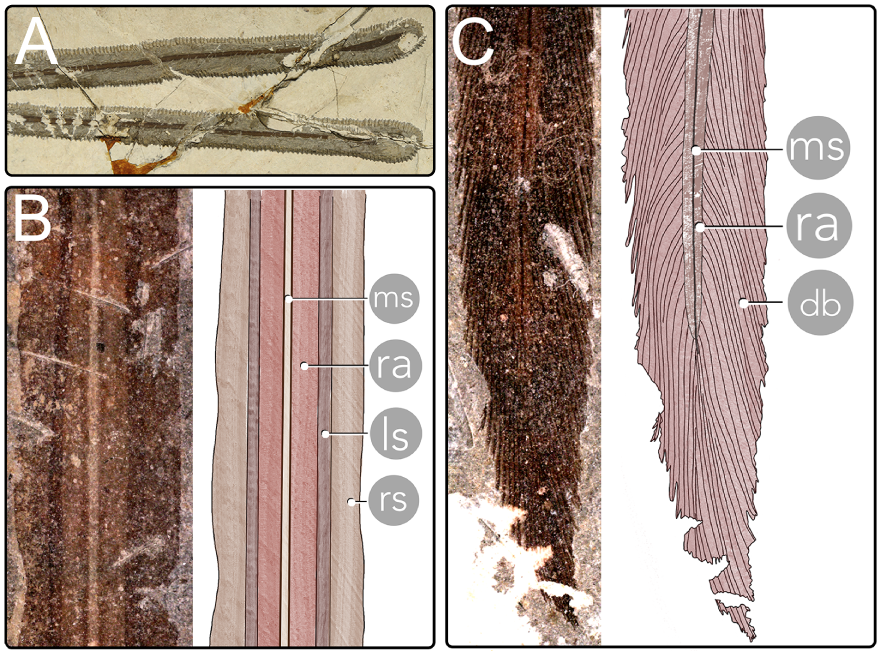
Details of the elongated tail feathers of P. bankoorum

The Plumadraco fossil material was discovered in outcrops of the Jiufotang Formation near Xiaotaizi Village in Jianchang County of Liaoning Province, China. The specimen is housed in the Shandong Tianyu Museum of Nature, where it is permanently accessioned as specimen STM11−4. The complete specimen is preserved in top view on a single slab, with all of the bones in their natural life positions. Feathers are visible around much of the animal, including the wings and tail.

In 2026, Alexander D. Clark and colleagues described Plumadraco bankoorum as a new genus and species of bohaiornithid enantiornithean based on these fossil remains, establishing STM11−4 as the holotype specimen. The generic name, Plumadraco, combines the Latin words pluma, meaning 'feather', and draco, meaning 'dragon'. The specific name, bankoorum, honors Winston E. and Paul C. Banko and their research on birds, especially in Hawaii, United States. The intended meaning of the full binomial name is 'Bankos' feather dragon'.

== Description ==
Plumadraco was a medium‑sized enantiornithine bird belonging to the family Bohaiornithidae. Its body mass is estimated at 112–144 g, which is comparable to that of some extant thrushes (e.g., Cochoa and Turdus) and honeyeaters (e.g., Anthochaera).

Plumadraco possessed a pair of extremely elongated rectrices (tail feathers), the length of which was approximately twice the body length (excluding the tail); in other enantiornithines, the length of these feathers ranged from 1.0 to 1.6 times the body length. The rectrices terminated distally (toward their tips) in distinctive rackets. The exceptional preservation of the tail‑feather impressions revealed previously unknown details of their structure. According to Clark and colleagues, such feathers were used primarily for display behaviour and courtship rituals. Since similar structures are considered a probable indicator of sexual dimorphism in enantiornithines, the authors suggested that the holotype of P. bankoorum belonged to a male.

== Classification ==
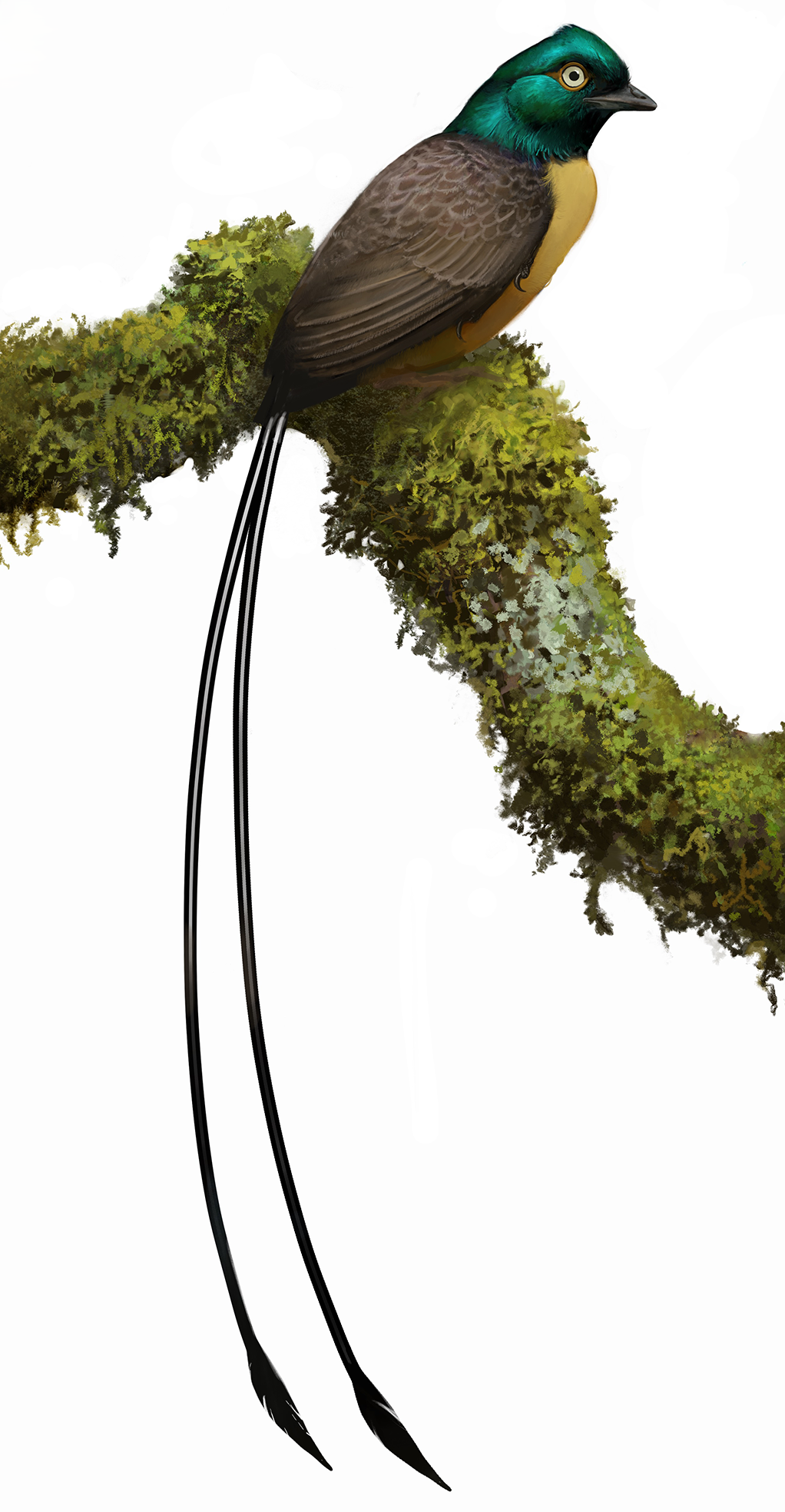
Life restoration

To test the affinities and relationships of Plumadraco, Clark et al. (2026) included it in an updated version of the phylogenetic matrix of Shen et al. (2024). They recovered it as the sister taxon to CUGB-P1202, a coeval unnamed immature bohaiornithid, in a clade also including Sulcavis. These results are displayed in the cladogram below:

- Bohaiornithidae
  - Gretcheniao
  - - Junornis
    - - - Neobohaiornis
        - Zhouornis
      - - - Sulcavis
          - - Plumadraco
            - CUGB-P1202
        - - BMNHC-Ph1204
          - - Longusunguis
            - - Bohaiornis
              - Parabohaiornis
