= Beiguornis =

Beiguornis Temporal range: Early Cretaceous, 125–120 Ma

Scientific classification
- Kingdom: Animalia
- Phylum: Chordata
- Class: Reptilia
- Clade: Dinosauria
- Clade: Saurischia
- Clade: Theropoda
- Clade: Avialae
- Clade: †Enantiornithes
- Family: †Bohaiornithidae
- Genus: †Beiguornis; Wang et al., 2022
- Species: †B. khinganensis

Binomial name
- †Beiguornis khinganensis Wang et al., 2022

Extinct genus of dinosaurs

Beiguornis is a genus of bohaiornithid dinosaurs from the Early Cretaceous Longjiang Formation of Inner Mongolia, China. The genus contains a single species, Beiguornis khinganensis. Beiguornis is the first and only enantiornithine known from the Longjiang Formation. In the phylogenetic analysis conducted by the describing authors, Beiguornis formed a monophyletic group with the bohaiornithids Sulcavis and Zhouornis.

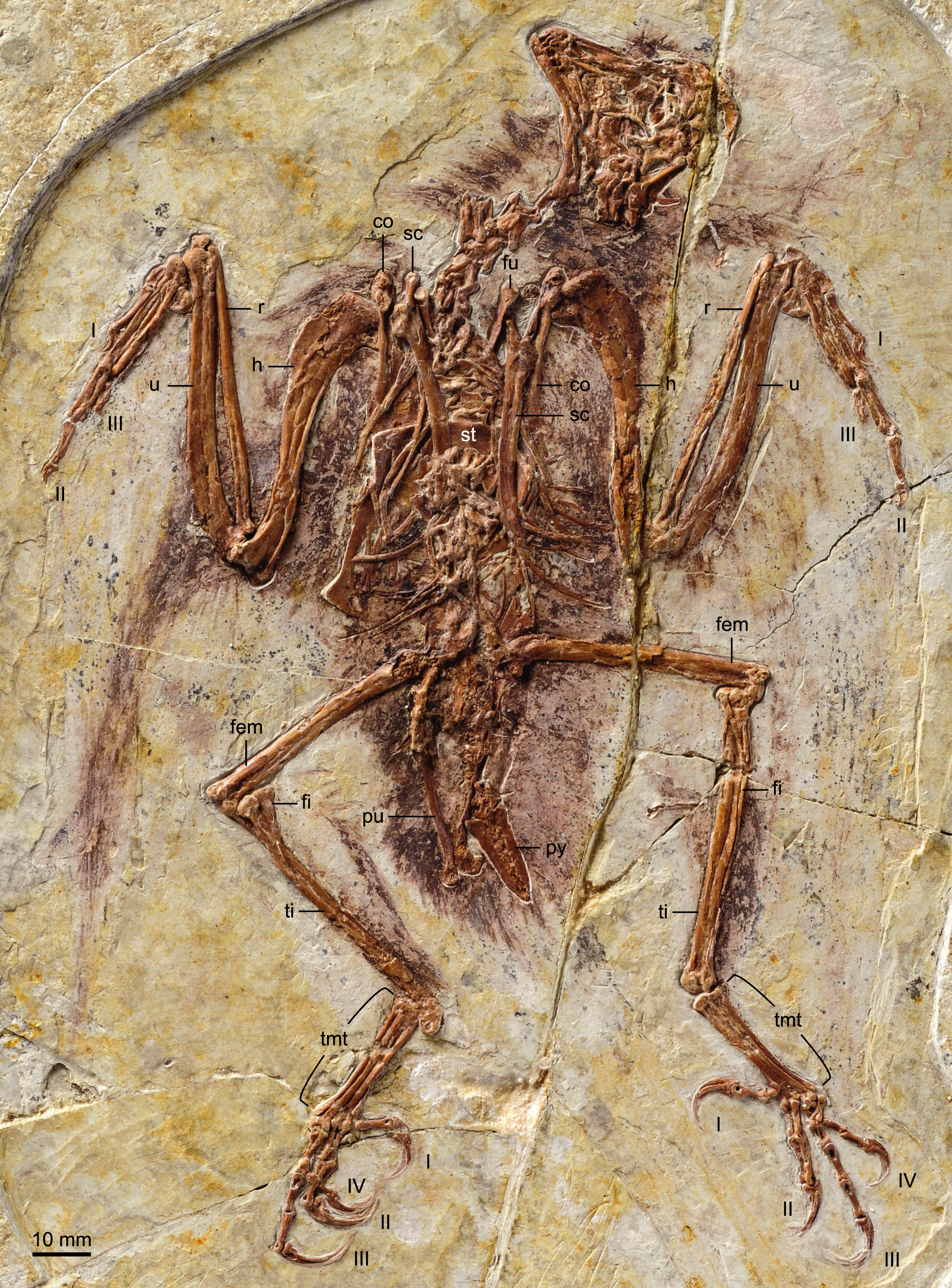
Holotype specimen of the related Zhouornis
