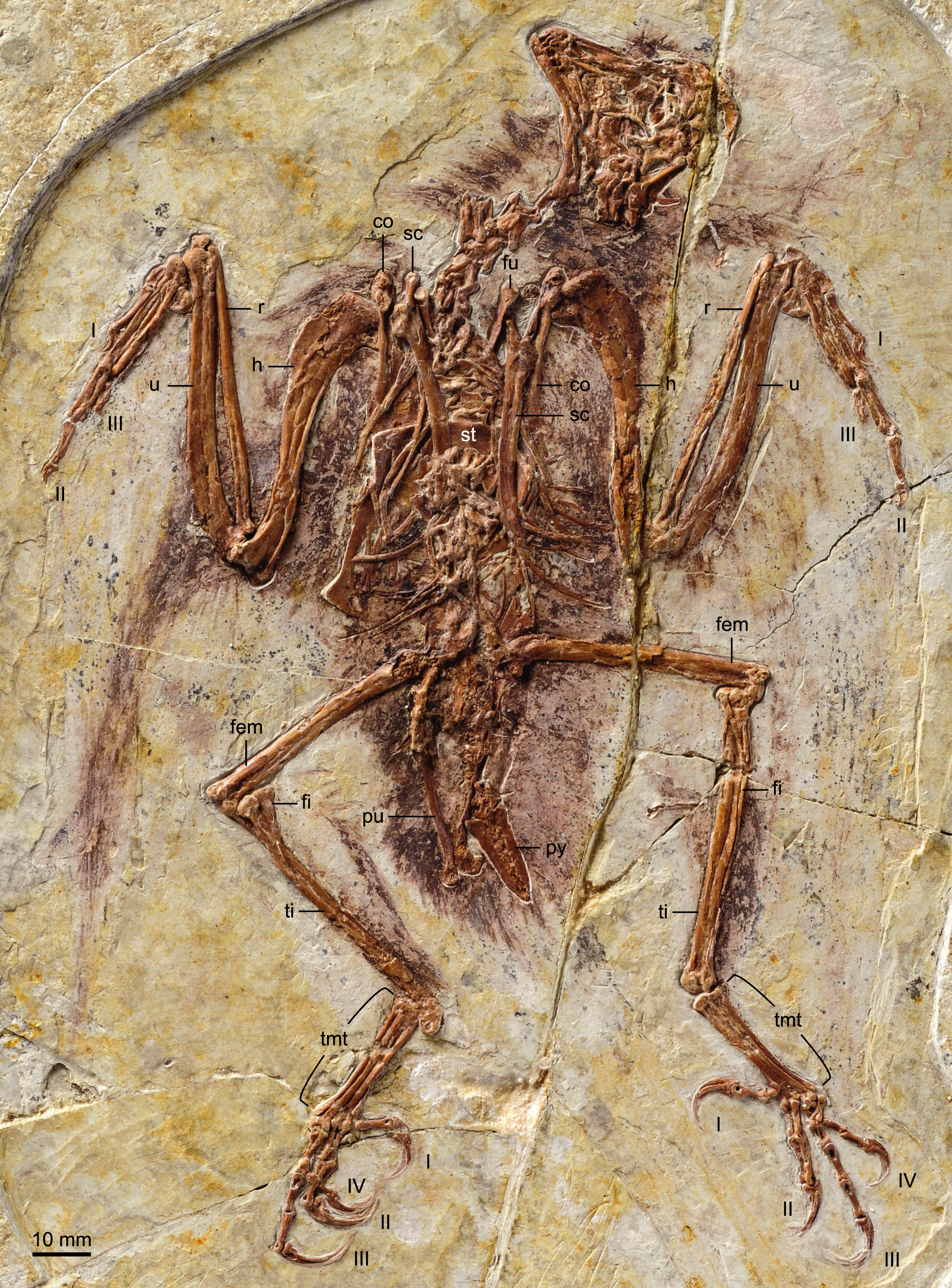
- Fossil specimen of Zhouornis hani

Scientific classification
- Kingdom: Animalia
- Phylum: Chordata
- Class: Reptilia
- Clade: Dinosauria
- Clade: Saurischia
- Clade: Theropoda
- Clade: Avialae
- Clade: †Enantiornithes
- Family: †Bohaiornithidae; Wang et al., 2014

Type species
- †Bohaiornis guoi Hu et al., 2011

Genera
- †Beiguornis; †Bohaiornis; †Eocathayornis?; †Eoenantiornis?; †Fortunguavis?; †Gretcheniao?; †Junornis; †Linyiornis?; †Longusunguis; †Mystiornis?; †Neobohaiornis; †Orienantius?; †Parabohaiornis; †Plumadraco; †Pterygornis?; †Qiliania?; †Shenqiornis; †Sulcavis; †Zhouornis

= Bohaiornithidae =

Bohaiornithids Temporal range: Early Cretaceous, 125–120 Ma

Extinct family of dinosaurs

Bohaiornithidae is a group of early enantiornithean stem-birds from the early Cretaceous Period of China. All undisputed Bohaiornithidae specimens come from the northeast of present-day China – specifically, the eastern and southern foothills of the Greater Khingan mountains –, and date to the early Aptian age, roughly 125–120 million years ago. As of 2024 they are not certainly known from outside this limited region and timeframe, even though there and then they were a prominent – and probably predatory, unlike the bulk of their relatives – element of the local fauna, namely the Jehol Biota. The taxon Bohaiornithidae was established by Wang and colleagues in 2014. They defined it as the natural group formed by all descendants of the common ancestor of the type species, Bohaiornis guoi, and Shenqiornis mengi.

== Description ==
Most adult bohaiornithids would have been rather similar in size and appearance to each other, and the family lacked the longevity and physical diversity of some other enantiornithean groups, such as the long-snouted longipterygids. The largest specimens of bohaiornithids assumed to have reached adulthood, namely the holotype of Zhouornis and a referred specimen of Bohaiornis, were about the size of a pigeon, which is much larger than most other Jehol enantiornitheans with the exception of Pengornis and Xiangornis. The smallest and youngest bohaiornithid specimens were about half the size of the largest ones.

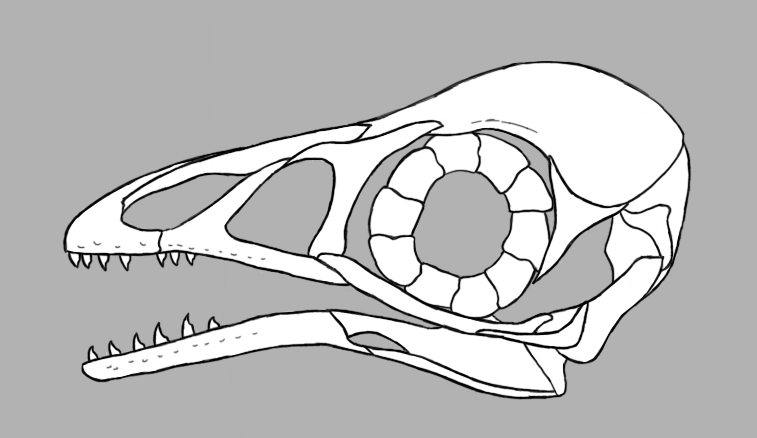
A reconstruction of the skull of Bohaiornis guoi showing the "half-toothed" jaws typical for this family

Similar to most enantiornitheans, bohaiornithids possessed teeth rather than a beak as in modern birds, although they could be distinguished from their relatives due to the structure of their teeth. Bohaiornithid teeth were large, robust and somewhat conical, but had sharply pointed tips which curved backwards. The first few teeth of the premaxillae are smaller than the rest of the teeth, but the other teeth in the front of the mouth were larger than those in the back. They usually lacked teeth only on the throatward half of the mandible (lower jaw) and two-thirds of the maxilla, unlike many other Enantiornithes whose teeth were essentially constrained to the premaxillary bone (upper bill tip).

Bohaiornithids also had lateral trabeculae (a pair of long and thin bony projections on the rear edge of the sternum) which not only extended backwards, but also outwards. The tips of each branch of the furcula (wishbone) are wide and rounded in bohaiornithids, as opposed to the tapering tips in other enantiornitheans. Their scapulae (shoulder blades) slightly curve downwards, created a convex top edge and concave lower edge. Bohaiornithids also had gradually tapering pygostyles. A bohaiornithid's second (innermost) toes were thicker than their other toes, while their third (middle) toes were long and thin and all of their toe claws were very long and curved.

Many bohaiornithids have been found preserving feathers, and specimens possessing a pair of long, ribbon-like tail feathers with variously altered barbs are kown from a number of species. These specialized feathers are known in many enantiornithean specimens (as well as Confuciusornis), and may be an example of sexual dimorphism, with the feathers being used by male members of a species for courtship display. A subadult specimen of an indeterminate bohaiornithid described in 2017 (CUGB P1202, probably closely related to Plumadraco) preserved feathers on various parts of the head and body which were analyzed and determined to have been iridescent in life.

== Paleoecology ==
A referred adult specimen of Bohaiornis was preserved with several rocks concentrated in the stomach region. Rocks in the stomach of birds and other animals are often believed to be gastroliths swallowed to assist in the digestion of plant material. However, the rocks apparently swallowed by this specimen are much larger, coarser, and less numerous than most gastroliths, and were unlikely to have been used for the same purpose as those swallowed by herbivores. Instead, it has been suggested that they were swallowed to help clean the digestive tract, a usage which has been reported in living birds of prey as well as other carnivorous animals with high-fat diets, such as pinnipeds. The description of this specimen claimed that it was plausible, but uncertain, that Bohaiornis was ecologically similar to birds of prey.

However, these rocks were later found to be mineral concretions, probably formed from the same mineral as the fossil specimen. Thus, they are not indicative of diet.

Bohaiornithids had foot proportions which were between those expected of arboreal and terrestrial birds, but their long claws make terrestrial habits unlikely. Nevertheless, bohaiornithids lacked many of the specialized foot features which allow modern birds to perch and climb tree trunks. Although long claws are known in modern birds of prey, bohaiornithids had short tarsometatarsals (ankle bones) which were dissimilar to most raptors with the exception of members of the subfamily Perninae.

Among birds of prey, bohaiornithids had leg proportions most similar to ospreys, and thus it is conceivable that they were piscivorous. However, their teeth suggest a diet of hard-shelled creatures.

== Classification ==
The cladogram below was found in the phylogenetic analysis of Wang et al. 2014, which itself was an updated version of O'Connor et al. 2013. The cladogram is based on a data matrix that includes 56 avialan taxa, scored based on 262 morphological traits.

- Enantiornithes
  - Protopteryx
  - Elsornis
  - Iberomesornis
  - Euenantiornithes
    - Longipterygidae
      - - Boluochia
        - Longipteryx
      - - Shanweiniao
        - - Longirostravis
          - Rapaxavis
    - - - IVPP V 18631
        - Pengornis
      - - Eocathayornis
        - - - Cathayornis
            - - Neuquenornis
              - Gobipteryx
              - Vescornis
              - Eoalulavis
              - - Concornis
                - Qiliania
          - - Eoenantiornis
            - Bohaiornithidae
              - - Shenqiornis
                - Sulcavis
              - - Zhouornis
                - - Longusunguis
                  - - Parabohaiornis
                    - Bohaiornis

In 2026, Clark et al. described Plumadraco, a new bohaiornithid with elongated tail plumes. The phylogenetic analysis performed recovered it close to Sulcavis and CUGB P1202. Junornis and Gretcheniao were recovered as the earliest-diverging members of the family. Shenqiornis, traditionally used to define the Bohaiornithidae, was excluded from this family.
