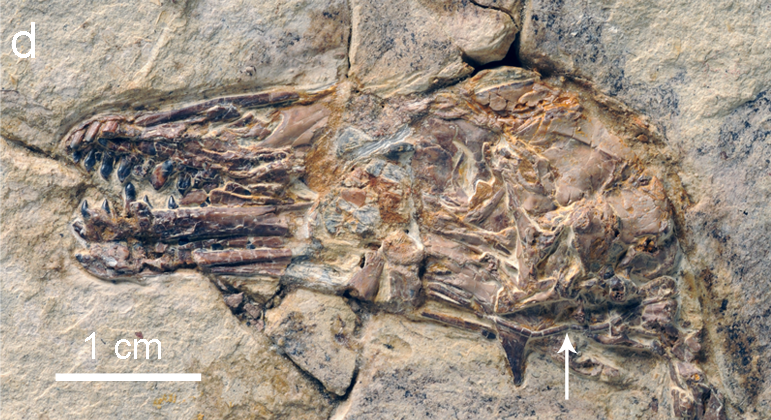
- Fossil skull

Scientific classification
- Kingdom: Animalia
- Phylum: Chordata
- Class: Reptilia
- Clade: Dinosauria
- Clade: Saurischia
- Clade: Theropoda
- Clade: Avialae
- Clade: †Enantiornithes
- Family: †Bohaiornithidae
- Genus: †Sulcavis; O’Connor et al., 2013

Type species
- †Sulcavis geeorum O’Connor et al., 2013

= Sulcavis =

Sulcavis Temporal range: Early Cretaceous, 125–121 Ma

Extinct genus of dinosaurs

Sulcavis is a genus of enantiornithean birds. One species is named, Sulcavis geeorum. The fossil was found in Early Cretaceous (121-125 million years ago) rocks in Liaoning Province, China.

Sulcavis is the first discovery of a bird with ornamented tooth enamel. The enantiornitheans are unique among birds in showing minimal tooth reduction and a diversity of dental patterns. Sulcavis had robust teeth with grooves on the inside surface, which likely strengthened the teeth against harder food items. No previous bird species have preserved ridges, striations, serrated edges, or any other form of dental ornamentation.

== Discovery ==
The holotype of Sulcavis, BMNH Ph-000805, is discovered near the town of Lamadong, in Liaoning Province, China. The fossil was found in the Yixian Formation, an Early Cretaceous rock formation. The genus was described on January 9, 2013, in an article that was published in the Journal of Vertebrate Paleontology by Jingmai Kathleen O'Connor, Yuguang Zhang, Luis Maria Chiappe, Qingjin Meng, Li Quanguo and Liu Di.

The type species of the new genus was named Sulcavis geeorum by the team of scientists. The genus name comes from the Latin words "sulcus" (groove) and "avis" (bird), reflecting the unusual dental characteristics of the genus. The specific name is to honour the Gee family from La Cañada (US) "because of their generous contributions to the research of Mesozoic birds". The holotype of Sulcavis geeorum was prepared by Maureen Walsh at the Natural History Museum of Los Angeles County, USA.

== Phylogeny ==
The cladogram below follows O’Connor et al., 2013 phylogenetic analysis.

- Pygostylia
  - Confuciusornithiformes
  - - Omnivoropterygiformes
    - Ornithothoraces
      - Euornithes
      - Enantiornithes
        - Protopteryx fengningensis
        - - Elsornis keni
          - - Longipterygidae
              - Boluochia zhengi
              - Longipteryx chaoyangensis
            - - Longirostravisidae
                - Eocathayornis walkeri
                - - Rapaxavis pani
                  - - Longirostravis hani
                    - Shanweiniao cooperorum
              - - Shenqiornis mengi
                - - Iberomesornis romerali
                  - Otogornis genghisi
                  - Sulcavis geeorum
                  - - - Pengornis houi
                      - Neuquenornis volans
                    - Gobipterygidae
                      - Gobipteryx minuta
                      - Vescornis hebeiensis
                  - - Eoenantiornis buhleri
                    - - - Eoalulavis hoyasi
                        - Liaoningornis longidigitris
                      - - Cathayornis
                        - Concornis lacustris
