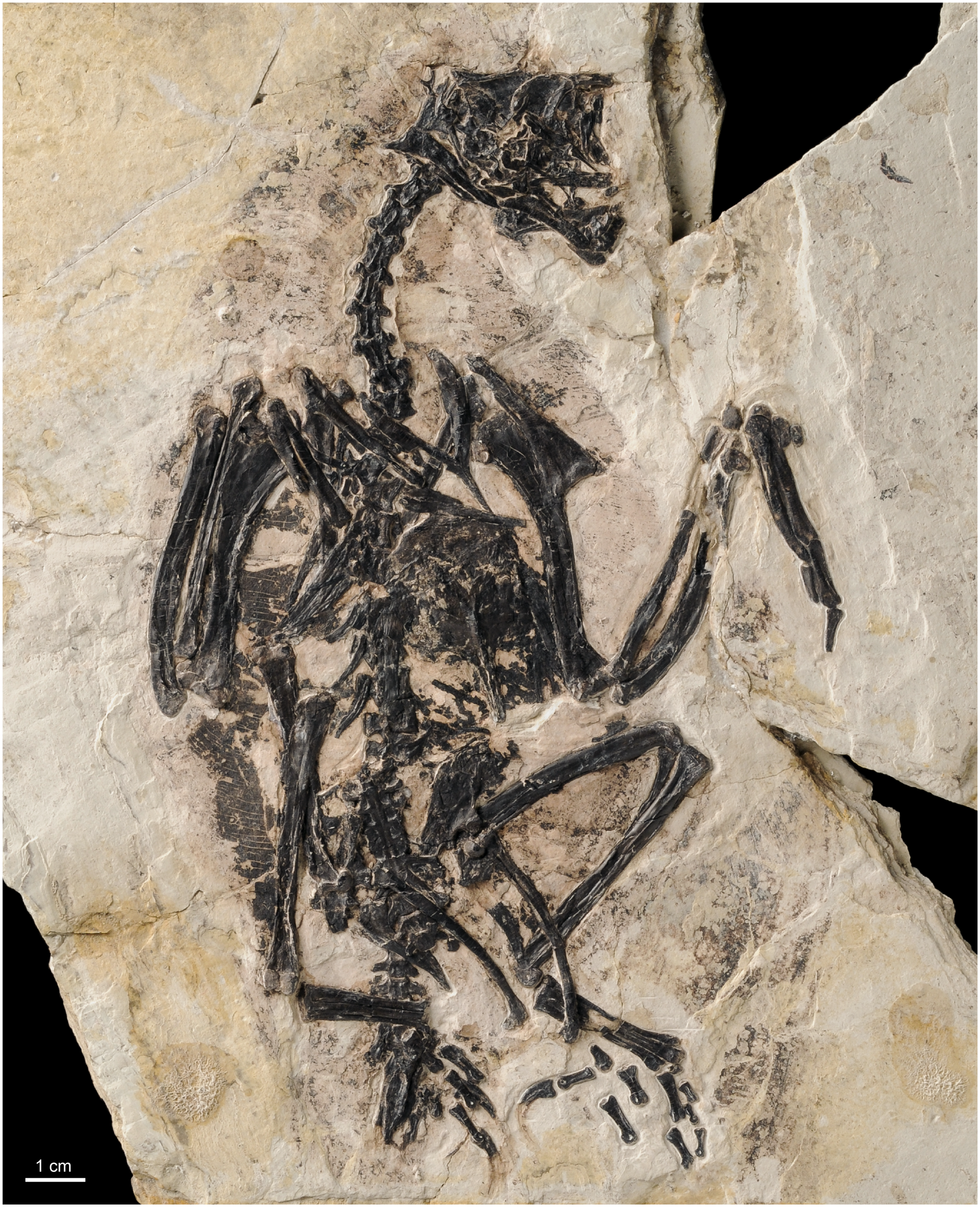
- Holotype specimen of G. sinensis

Scientific classification
- Kingdom: Animalia
- Phylum: Chordata
- Class: Reptilia
- Clade: Dinosauria
- Clade: Saurischia
- Clade: Theropoda
- Clade: Avialae
- Clade: †Enantiornithes
- Genus: †Gretcheniao
- Species: †G. sinensis

Binomial name
- †Gretcheniao sinensis Chiappe et al., 2019

= Gretcheniao =

Gretcheniao Temporal range: Early Cretaceous, Barremian

Extinct genus of enantiornithean

Gretcheniao is an extinct genus of enantiornithean bird known from the Early Cretaceous (Barremian age) Yixian Formation of Liaoning, China.

Some cladistic analyses have tentatively placed Gretcheniao in the Bohaiornithidae, though other work has not been able to resolve its position between bohaiornithids and more advanced enantiornitheans such as Cathayornis, Eoalulavis and Neuquenornis. In their 2026 description of Plumadraco, Clark et al. recovered Gretcheniao as a basal member of the Bohaiornithidae.
