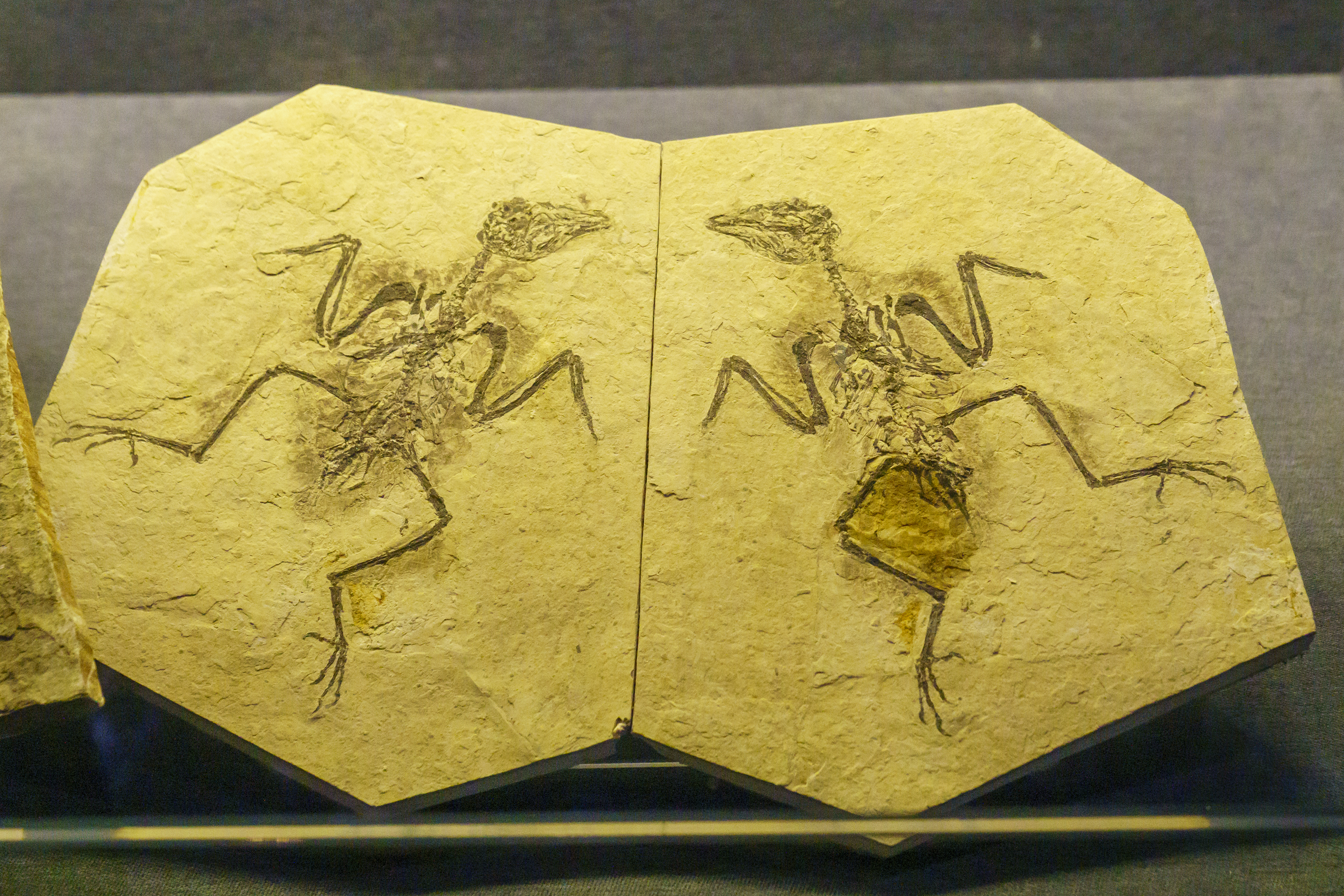
- Fossil

Scientific classification
- Kingdom: Animalia
- Phylum: Chordata
- Class: Reptilia
- Clade: Dinosauria
- Clade: Saurischia
- Clade: Theropoda
- Clade: Avialae
- Clade: †Enantiornithes
- Family: †Bohaiornithidae
- Genus: †Bohaiornis; Hu et al., 2011
- Species: †B. guoi

Binomial name
- †Bohaiornis guoi Hu et al., 2011

= Bohaiornis =

Bohaiornis Temporal range: Early Cretaceous, 120 Ma

Extinct genus of dinosaurs

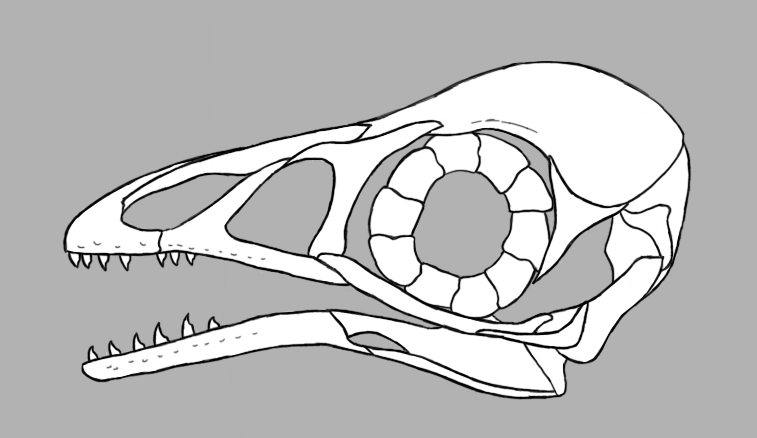
Reconstructed skull

Bohaiornis is a genus of enantiornithean dinosaurs. Fossils have been found from the Lower Cretaceous Jiufotang Formation of western Liaoning, China. The only known species, Bohaiornis guoi, was named by Dongyu Hu, Li Li, Lianhaim Hou and Xing Xu in 2011 on the basis of a fully articulated and well-preserved skeleton of a sub-adult. This specimen, LPM (Liaoning Paleontological Museum) B00167, preserved two long, ribbon-like feathers attached to the tail rather than a fan of shorter pennaceous feathers. It was similar to the slightly older Eoenantiornis, but much larger in size. Bohaiornis is the type species of Bohaiornithidae, a family of large predatory enantiornitheans from the Early Cretaceous.

In 2014, a second, even larger specimen was described. This second specimen (IVPP V17963) showed that the snout was relatively broad compared to other enantiornitheans, and also preserved several rock-like structures within the abdominal cavity. These were inferred to be large, rough-textured gastroliths. The presence of only a few large and rough gastroliths in birds and other dinosaurs usually indicates a mainly carnivorous diet, suggesting that B. guoi may have had a raptorial ecology. However, these structures were later found to be mineral concretions which formed after the animal had already died.
