= Shenqiornis =

Shenqiornis Temporal range: Early Cretaceous, 122 Ma

Scientific classification
- Domain: Eukaryota
- Kingdom: Animalia
- Phylum: Chordata
- Clade: Dinosauria
- Clade: Saurischia
- Clade: Theropoda
- Clade: Avialae
- Clade: †Enantiornithes
- Family: †Bohaiornithidae
- Genus: †Shenqiornis; Wang et al., 2010
- Species: †S. mengi

Binomial name
- †Shenqiornis mengi Wang et al., 2010

Extinct genus of dinosaurs

Shenqiornis is a genus of enantiornithean dinosaurs. It was found in the Qiaotou Member of the Huajiying Formation of Hebei Province, China, and is therefore of uncertain age. The Qiaotou Member may correlate with the more well-known Early Cretaceous Yixian Formation, and so probably is dated to the Aptian, around 122 million years ago.

The type species Shenqiornis mengi was in 2010 named and described by Wang Xuri, Jingmai O'Connor, Zhao Bo, Luis María Chiappe, Gao Chunling and Cheng Xiaodong. The generic name combines a reference to Shenzhou 7 with a Greek ornis, "bird". The specific name honours Meng Qingjin, the former director of the Dalian Natural History Museum. The holotype is DNHM D2950-2951, a plate and counterplate containing a largely complete skeleton of a subaldult.
