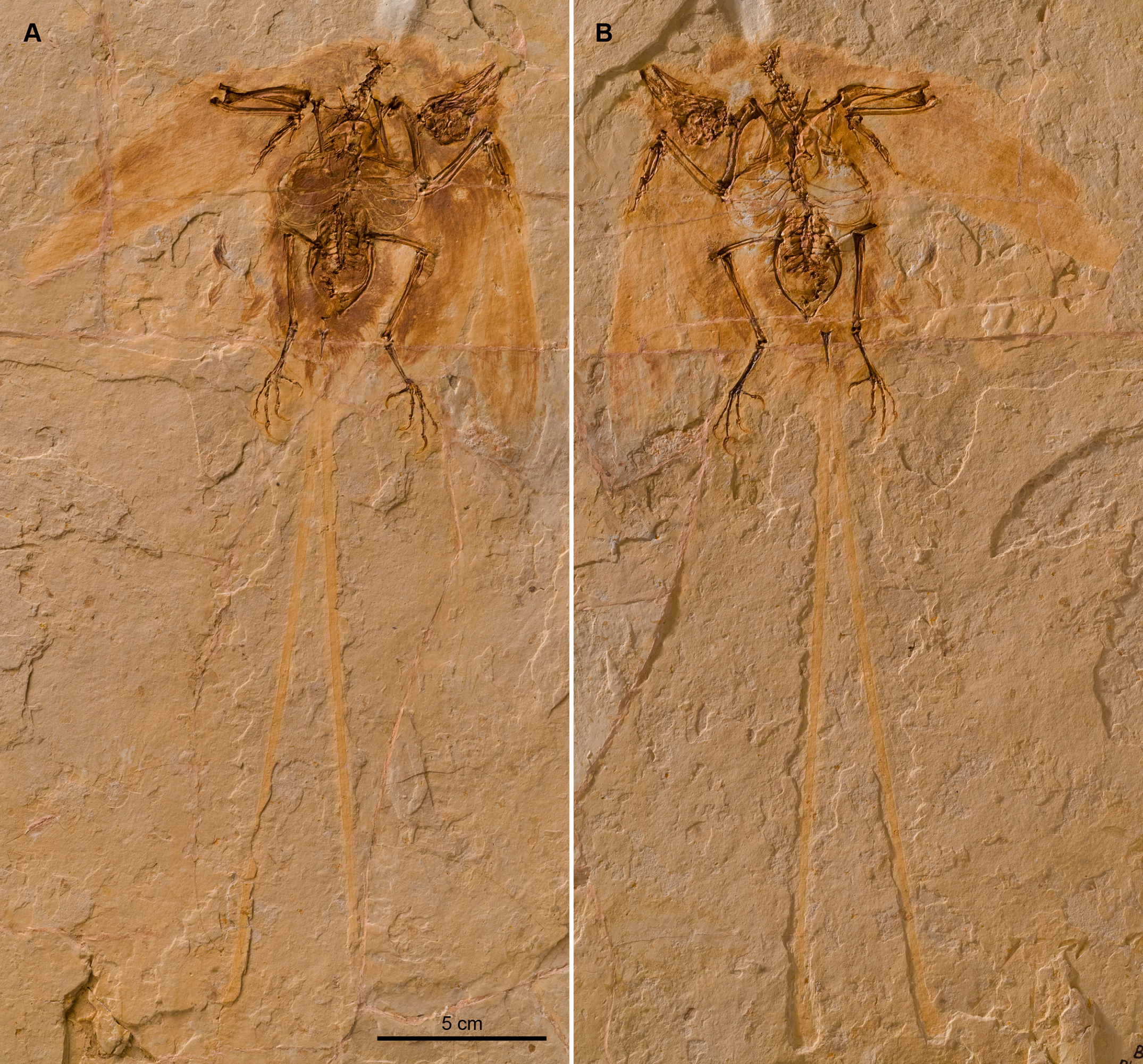
- Slab and counterslab of the holotype specimen

Scientific classification
- Kingdom: Animalia
- Phylum: Chordata
- Class: Reptilia
- Clade: Dinosauria
- Clade: Saurischia
- Clade: Theropoda
- Clade: Avialae
- Clade: †Enantiornithes
- Genus: †Junornis; Liu et al., 2017

Type species
- †Junornis houi Liu et al., 2017

= Junornis =

Junornis Temporal range: Early Cretaceous, 126 Ma

Extinct genus of enantiornithean bird

Junornis is an extinct genus of enantiornithean bird that lived during the Early Cretaceous of what is now China.

It is known from a skeleton that includes traces of plumage, including elongated tail feathers. Such elongated feathers are common in the family Bohaiornithidae.

== Discovery ==
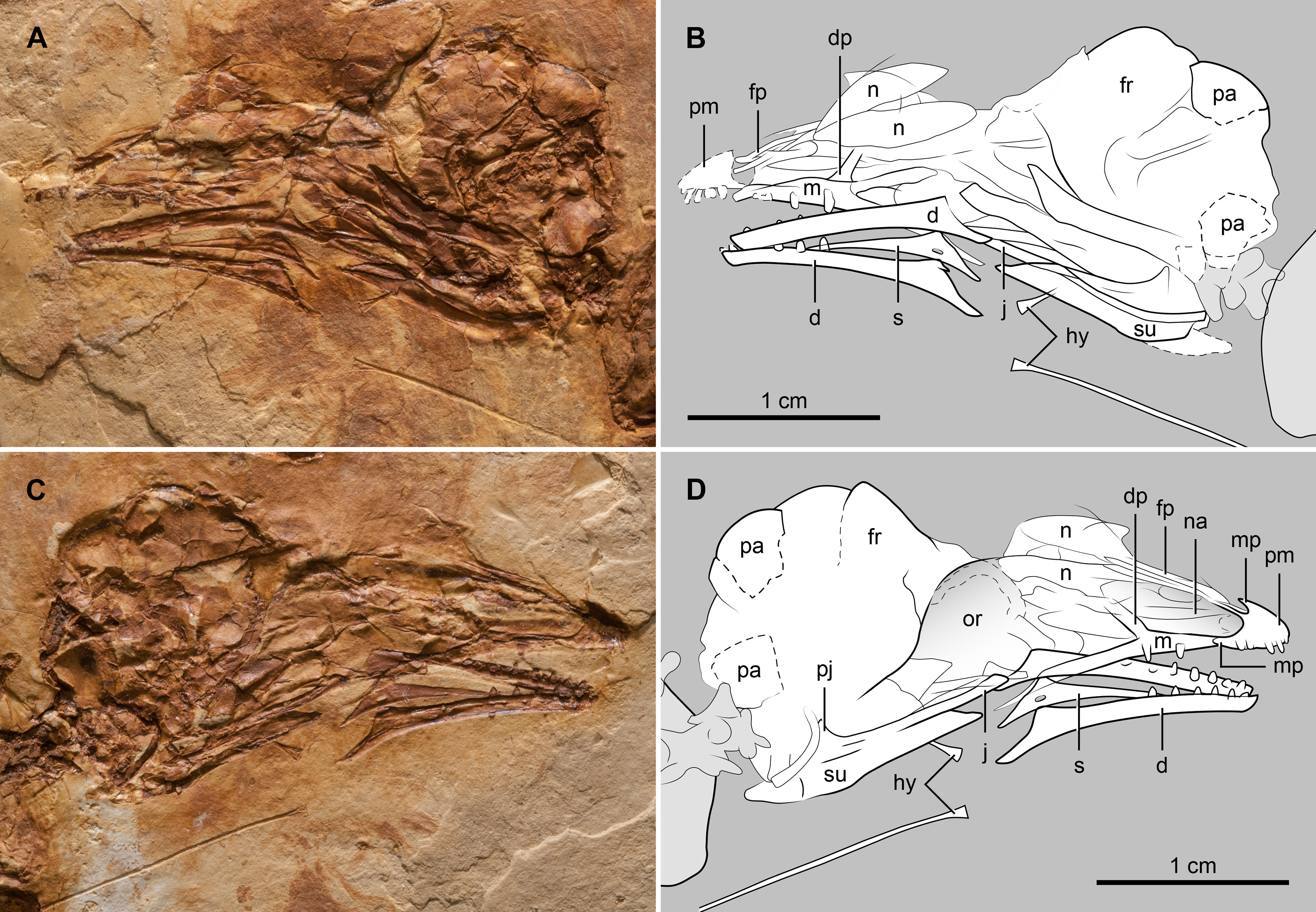
Skull

At Liutiaogou village, near the town of Daming in Ningcheng County, Inner-Mongolia, a bird skeleton was excavated that was acquired by the Beijing Museum of Natural History. It was further prepared by Maureen Walsh.

In 2017 Liu Di, Luis M. Chiappe, Francisco Serrano, Michael Habib, Zhang Yuguang and Meng Qinjing named and described the type species Junornis houi. The generic name is derived from Chinese jun, 俊, "beautiful", and Greek ornis, "bird". The specific name honours the Chinese paleoorntithologist Hou Lianhai.

The holotype, BMNHC-PH 919, was found in a layer of the Yixian Formation that is roughly 126 million years old. It consists of a skeleton with skull, compressed on a plate and counterplate. The skeleton is largely associated, though the skull is detached. Bone conservation is excellent. Extensive remains of the plumage have been preserved.
