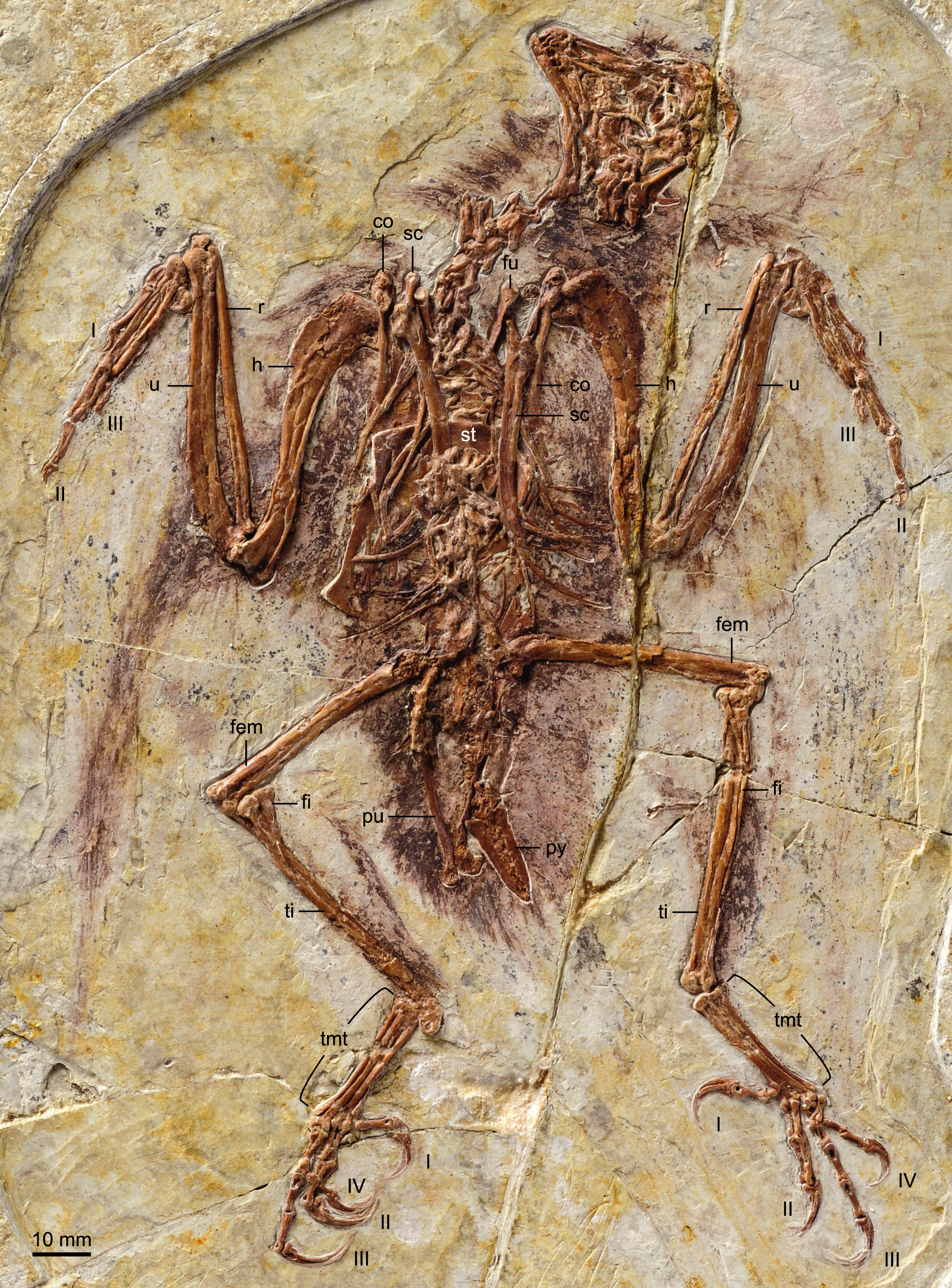
- Holotype specimen

Scientific classification
- Kingdom: Animalia
- Phylum: Chordata
- Class: Reptilia
- Clade: Dinosauria
- Clade: Saurischia
- Clade: Theropoda
- Clade: Avialae
- Clade: †Enantiornithes
- Family: †Bohaiornithidae
- Genus: †Zhouornis; Zhang et al., 2013

Type species
- †Zhouornis hani Zhang et al., 2013

= Zhouornis =

Zhouornis Temporal range: Early Cretaceous

Extinct genus of dinosaurs

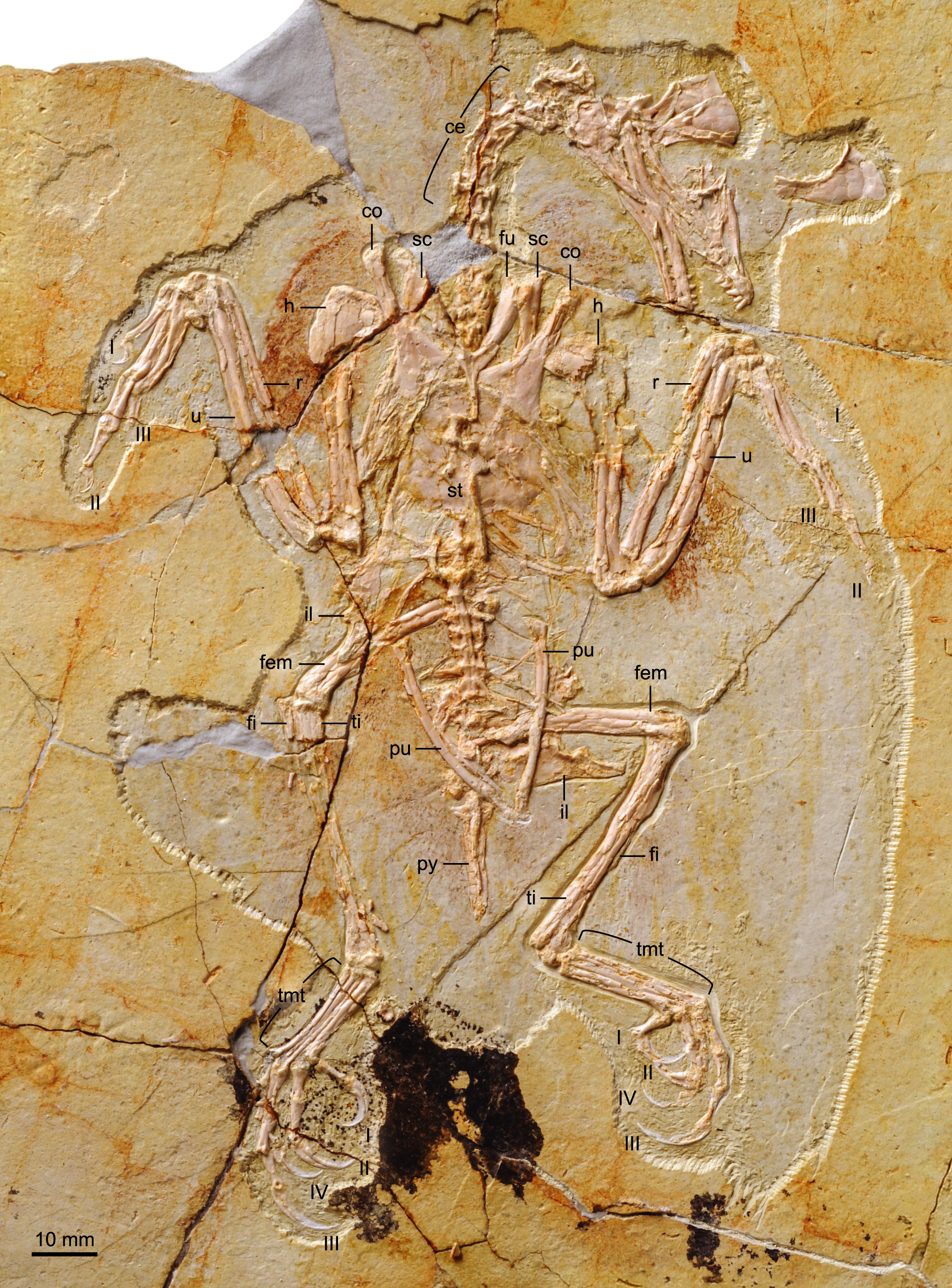
Referred specimen

Zhouornis is an extinct genus of enantiornithean dinosaurs known from the Early Cretaceous Jehol Group (Aptian stage) of western Liaoning Province, northeastern China. Zhouornis was first named by Zhang Zihui, Luis María Chiappe, Gang Han and Anusuya Chinsamy in 2013 and the type species is Zhouornis hani.
