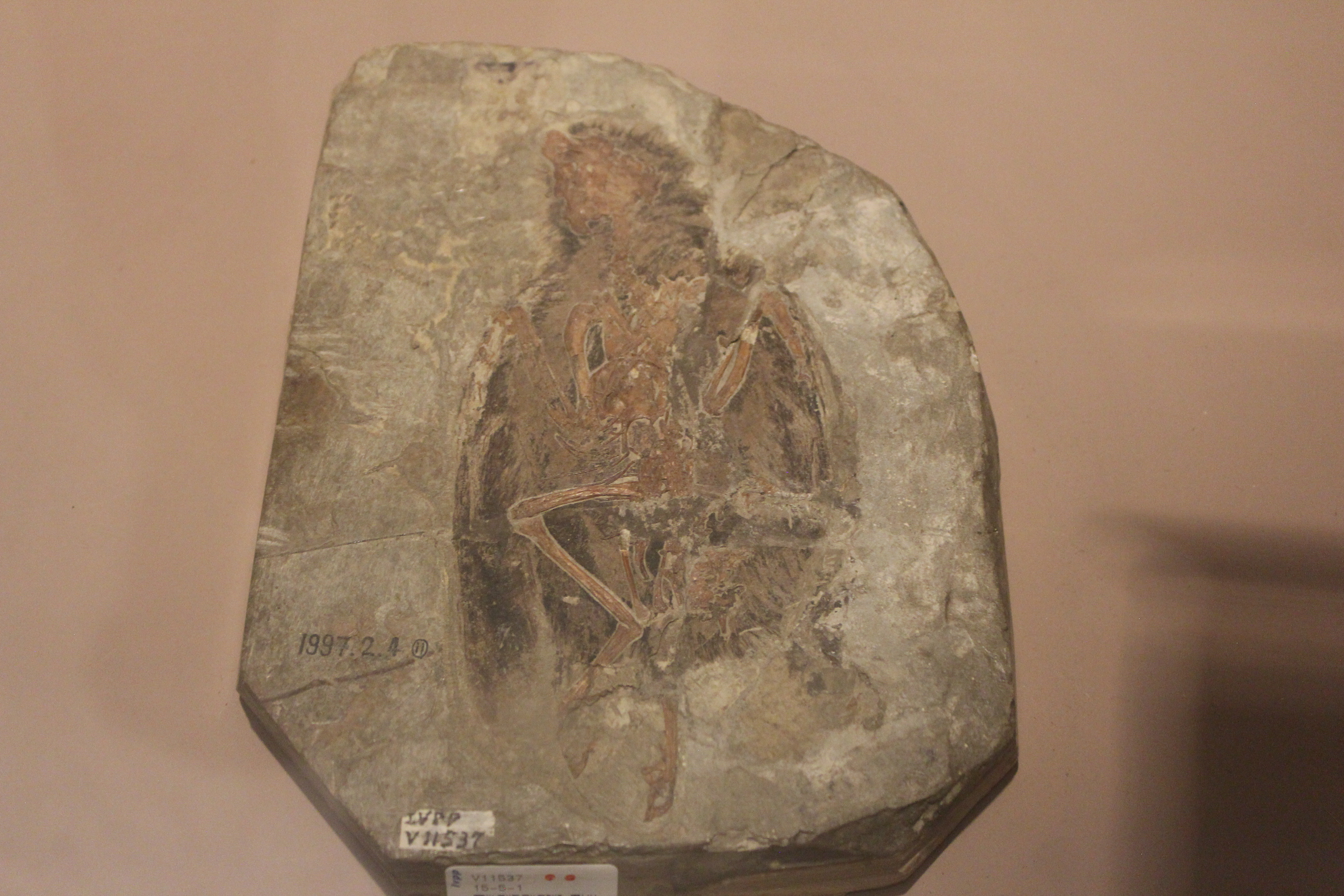
- Holotype specimen, Paleozoological Museum of China

Scientific classification
- Kingdom: Animalia
- Phylum: Chordata
- Class: Reptilia
- Clade: Dinosauria
- Clade: Saurischia
- Clade: Theropoda
- Clade: Avialae
- Clade: †Enantiornithes
- Order: †Eoenantiornithiformes; Hou et al., 1999
- Family: †Eoenantiornithidae; Hou et al., 1999
- Genus: †Eoenantiornis; Hou et al., 1999
- Species: †E. buhleri

Binomial name
- †Eoenantiornis buhleri Hou et al., 1999

= Eoenantiornis =

Eoenantiornis Temporal range: Early Cretaceous, 124.6 Ma

Extinct genus of birds

Eoenantiornis is a genus of enantiornithean birds which lived during the early Cretaceous period (124.6 Ma ago). It is known from a single fossil specimen found in the Yixian Formation in Liaoning province, China.

In 1999, the type species Eoenantiornis buhleri was named and described by Hou Lianhu, Larry Martin, Zhou Zhonghe and John Alan Feduccia. The generic name combines a Greek ἠώς, èos, "dawn" with Enantiornis, in reference to a presumed more basal position in relation to that genus. The specific name honours the late German paleornithologist Paul Bühler.

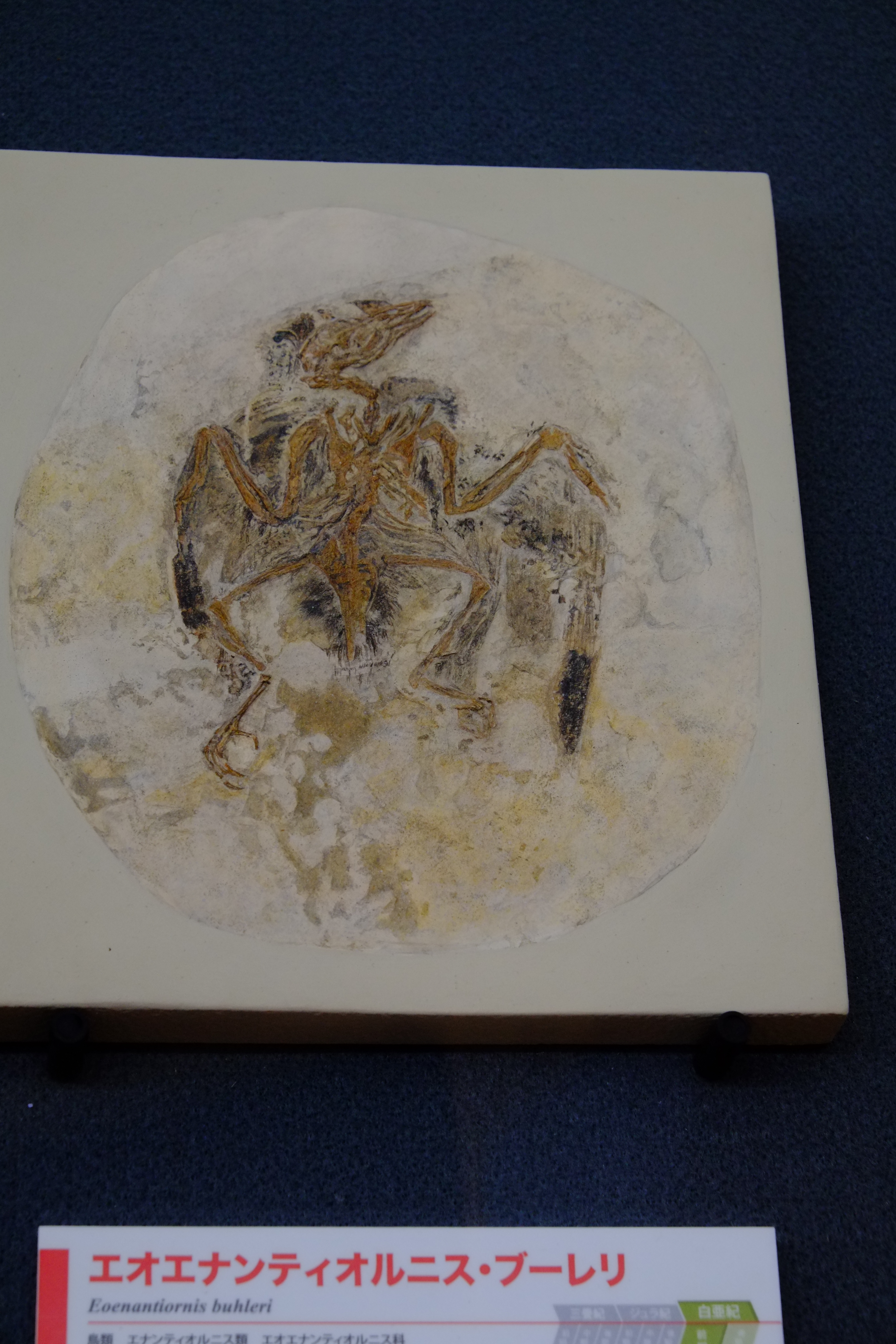
Fossil

The holotype, IVPP V11537, was found at Heitizigou in Liaoning in a layer of the lower Yixian Formation dating from the early Aptian. It consists of a nearly complete and articulated skeleton with skull compressed on a plate, preserving most of the feather integument. It represents a not fully grown individual.

In 2005, Eoenantiornis was completely redescribed.

Originally, the species was placed in a "family" Eoenantiornithidae and even an "order" Eoenantiornithiformes. In 2005, these concepts were abandoned and it was concluded that the position was in the clade Euenantiornithes. It is one of the oldest known derived enantiornithines.
