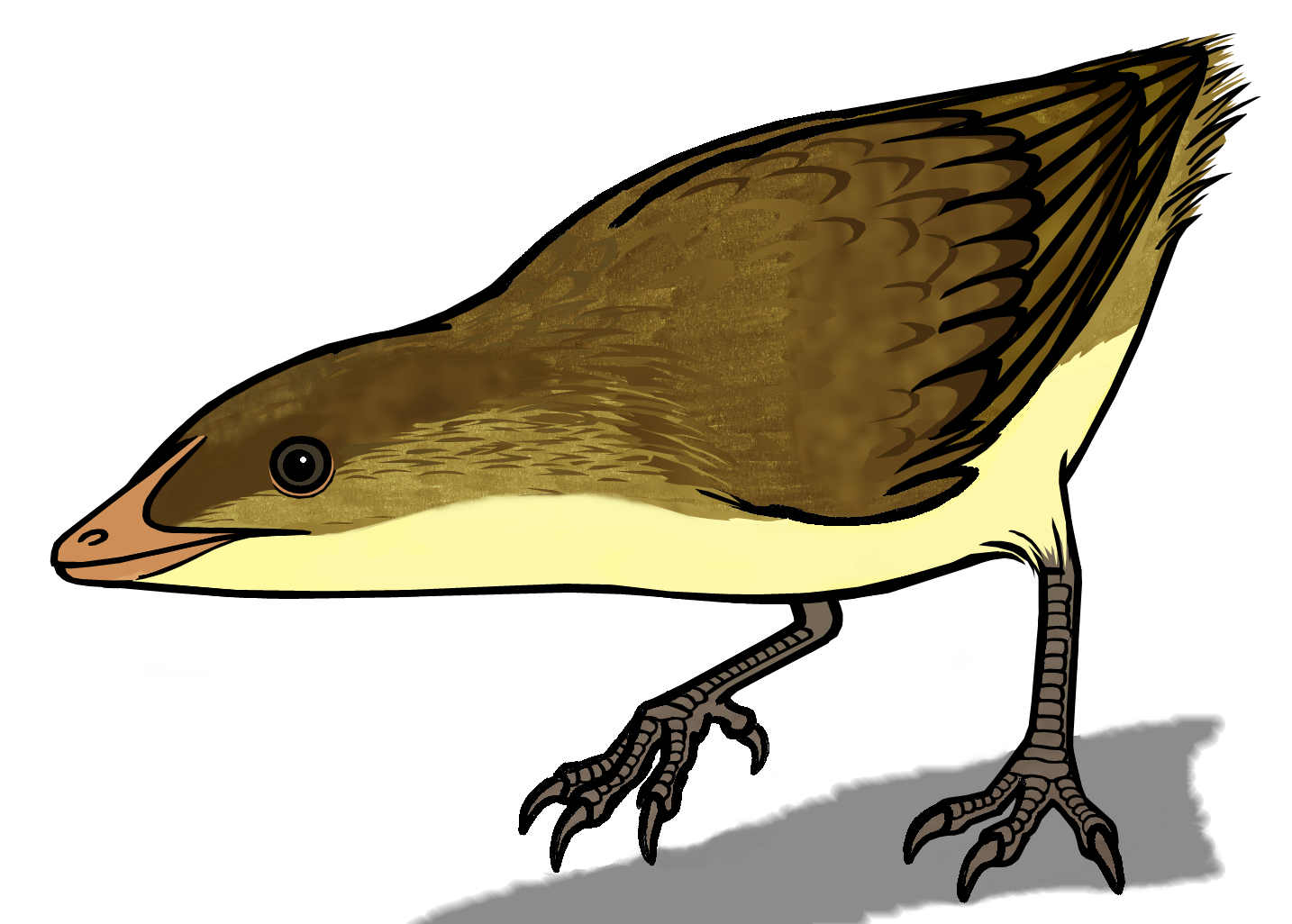
- Life restoration.

Scientific classification
- Kingdom: Animalia
- Phylum: Chordata
- Class: Reptilia
- Clade: Dinosauria
- Clade: Saurischia
- Clade: Theropoda
- Clade: Avialae
- Clade: †Enantiornithes
- Genus: †Eoalulavis; Sanz et al., 1996
- Species: †E. hoyasi

Binomial name
- †Eoalulavis hoyasi Sanz et al., 1996

= Eoalulavis =

Eoalulavis Temporal range: Early Cretaceous, 125 Ma

Extinct genus of birds

Eoalulavis (from the Ancient Greek: Éōs, "dawn"; alula, "bastard wing"; avis, "bird") is a monotypic genus of enantiornithean bird that lived during the Barremian, in the Lower Cretaceous around 125 million years ago. The only known species is Eoalulavis hoyasi.

== Discovery ==
Its remains came from the Konservat-Lagerstätte of Las Hoyas, Cuenca, Spain. The holotype (LH13500), housed in the collection of Museo de las Ciencias de Castilla-La Mancha, consists on both slab and counterslab preserving mainly the thoracic region, part of the neck and both almost complete forelimbs of an adult specimen. It also preserves remains of the body, primary, secondary feathers and a bastard wing which have been covered by layers of limonite as a result of the fossilization process. The preservation is consistent with the taphonomic processes associated with obruption, stagnation and the action of microbial mats in the locality that have yielded a wide variety of examples of soft-tissue preservation (e.g., connective tissues in fishes and theropods or insect wings). Most of the osteological features of the holotype became apparent only after its acid preparation and transference to a resin cast.

== Description ==
=== Size ===
According to its initial description, E. hoyasi was roughly the size of a european goldfinch (Carduelis carduelis), with the bony elements of its wings approximately 17 centimeters (7 inches) in length. Later studies estimated that it had a weight of approximately 45 grams (1.6 ounces) and total wingspan (including feathers) of about 26 centimeters (10 inches), giving it proportions similar to those of a common kingfisher (Alcedo atthis).

=== Characteristics ===
One of the most unusual features of this genus lies in the shape of its bony sternum (breastplate). While most early birds had wide sternums, Eoalulavis had a very thin one, with an expanded front end tapering to a point as well as a rear tip with outward-pointing extensions. This form has been described as "spear-shaped" or "fish-shaped" by some.

The morphology of the forelimb in Eoalulavis is remarkably primitive compared with that of other genera of enantiornithean birds. The alular and major digits both bear a large ungual phalanx and the minor one bears two phalanx. Also the alular digit extends until the distal end of the major metacarpal, which is considered a primitive trait within the clade Enantiornithes.

At the time of its discovery, it was the earliest bird known to possess an alula, a batch of feathers on the alular (first) digit that in modern birds can be separately moved to improve stability at low flight speeds. Later, more enantiornithean specimens were discovered with alula and this fact has consequently strengthened the hypothesis that these animals were able to develop a highly complex and active flight. The wide presence of this trait in both Enantiornithes and Ornithuromorpha, the clade which comprises modern birds along with their fossil counterparts, suggest that the development of the alula, and the flight capabilities that it implies, occur early in the avian evolution, presumably in the base of Ornithothoraces.

== Paleobiology and Paleoecology ==
=== Flight ===
The presence of alula and a complete set of aerodynamic asymmetric feathers arranged forming a modern wing, indicate well develop flight capabilities, as in many other enantiornithean taxa. Its hindlimb morphology remain uncertain as no material of this kind referable to the genus has been found to date. A 2018 study analyzed the proportions of Eoalulavis and Concornis to determine the optimal flight pattern for those genera. The study found that they likely engaged in bounding flight, a form of flight popular among modern small and short-winged birds. A bird engaging in bounding flight alternates between upward-thrusting flaps and short dives with folded wings. The study also found that they were capable of continuous flapping flight, but were likely unable to glide due to having a high body mass to wingspan ratio. The study concluded that Eolalulavis, Concornis, and likely many other enantiornitheans alternated between the fast bounding flight and the slower but more efficient flapping flight depending on the circumstances, similar to modern songbirds and woodpeckers.

=== Diet ===
The holotype preserves concentrated remains of crustacean cuticles in the area of the abdomen, interpreted as its last meal. It provided the first direct evidence of feeding behaviour in Enantiornithes and in Mesozoic birds in general, though, since then, more examples of undigested food associated with enantiornithine specimens have been discovered reporting a wide variety of feeding habits. This fact has been interpreted as evidence of an ecological role in Eoalulavis similar to that of extant waders; living mainly in the shore seeking for little invertebrates in a similar way of modern turnstones.

=== Environment ===
The locality of Las Hoyas was in the Barremian a seasonal subtropical wetland ecologically dominated by fully aquatic organisms (e.g.: holostean fishes). The avifauna of the locality includes so far two more enantiornithean taxa: the sparrow-sized Iberomesornis romerali and the starling-sized Concornis lacustris. Eoalulavis hoyasi is believed to be the most linked to a semi-aquatic environment of the three.

== Classification ==
The phylogenetic relationships within Enantiornithes are largely unsolved so far whilst several phylogenetic analyses have been performed in the last decades. However, some groups of Enantiornithes seem to have fairly strong statistical support. In the last cladistic analysis Eoalulavis groups with the Chinese genus Liaoningornis forming a monophyletic group of derived Enantiornithes. Nevertheless, this concrete grouping has not a high statistical support and the enantiornithean status of Liaoningornis remains currently controversial.

Eoalulavis hoyasi presents numerous synapomorphies that justifies the inclusion of the taxon within Enantiornithes and the less inclusive clade Euenantiornithes. These traits include a groove in the inter-osseous surface of radius or a conspicuous foramen in the dorsal surface of the strut-like coracoids.
