= Chromeornis =

Chromeornis Temporal range: Early Cretaceous (Aptian), 120 Ma

Scientific classification
- Kingdom: Animalia
- Phylum: Chordata
- Class: Reptilia
- Clade: Dinosauria
- Clade: Saurischia
- Clade: Theropoda
- Clade: Avialae
- Clade: †Enantiornithes
- Family: †Longipterygidae
- Clade: †Longipteryginae
- Genus: †Chromeornis; O'Connor et al., 2025
- Species: †C. funkyi

Binomial name
- †Chromeornis funkyi O'Connor et al., 2025

Extinct bird genus

Chromeornis (croh-mee-OR-niss; lit. 'Chromeo bird') is an extinct genus of longipterygid enantiornithean bird known from the Early Cretaceous (Aptian age) Jiufotang Formation of China. The genus contains a single species, Chromeornis funkyi, known from most of an articulated skeleton preserved on a slab and counterslab. This specimen was found with a mass of gastroliths in the esophagus, but these were likely not the gizzard stones expected in the gizzard of some birds. Instead, they may have been the result of an illness, with the animal dying after attempting to regurgitate them.

== Discovery and naming ==
The Chromeornis fossil material was discovered in outcrops of the Jiufotang Formation near Lamadong Town of Liaoning Province, China. The specimen is housed in the Shandong Tianyu Museum of Nature in Shandong Province, China, where it is permanently accessioned as specimen STM7-156. The specimen consists of most of an articulated skeleton with associated feathers, belonging to a single individual preserved on a slab and counterslab. Most of the pelvis and the left pedal (foot) digits are not preserved, and the right forelimb and remaining pelvic material are disarticulated.

In 2025, Jingmai O'Connor and colleagues described Chromeornis funkyi as a new genus and species of enantiornthean bird based on these fossil remains, establishing STM7-156 as the holotype specimen. The generic name, Chromeornis, references Chromeo—an electro-funk group—and their music, combined with the Greek word ornis, meaning 'bird'. The specific name, funkyi, alludes to the two musicians of the group—Dave 1 and P-Thugg—together called the 'Funklordz'. The intended meaning of the full binomial name is 'funky Chromeo bird'.

== Description ==
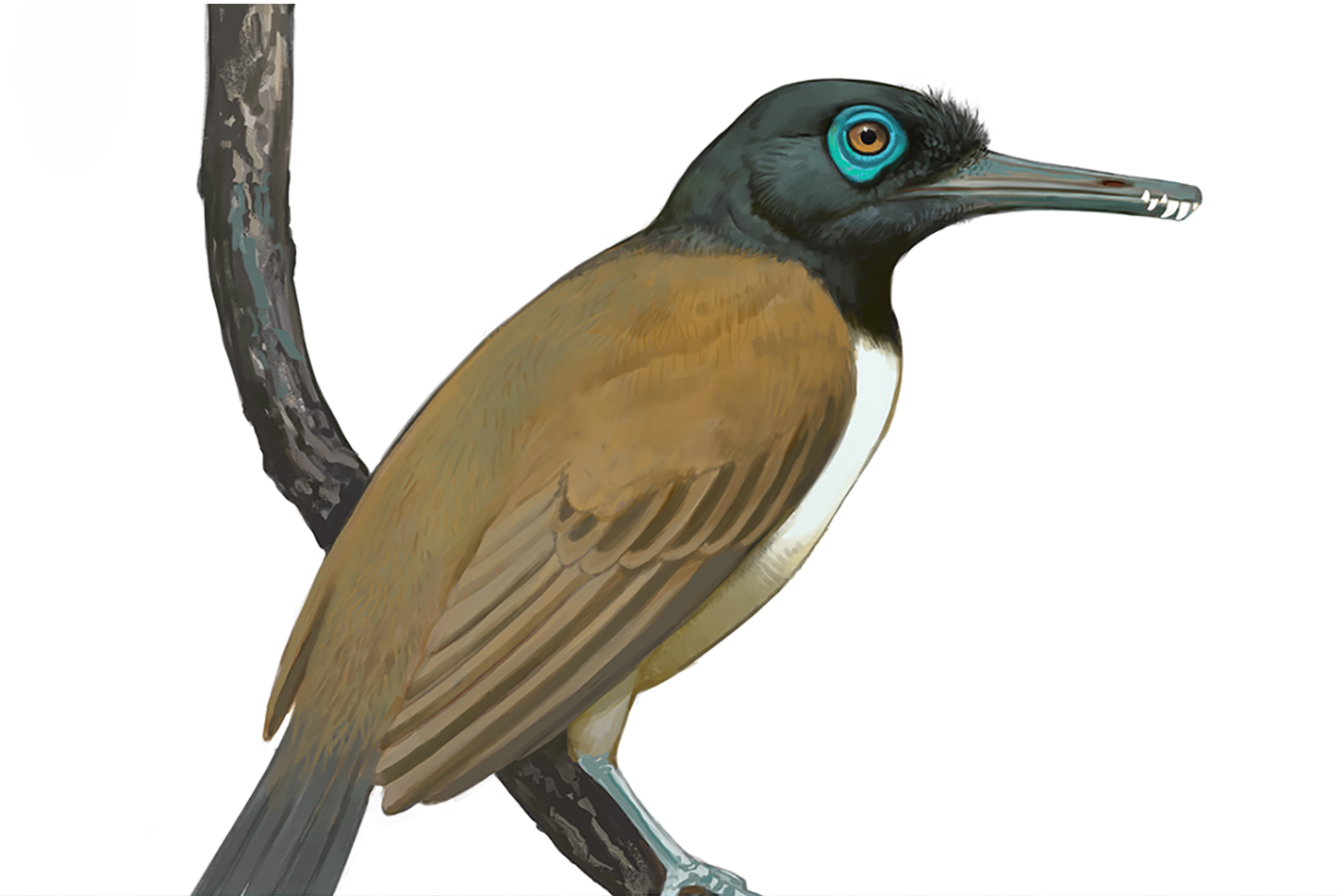
Speculative life restoration of the closely related Longipteryx

Chromeornis is a small member of the Longipterygidae, with an estimated body mass of 33.5 grams (0.074 lb). It can be identified as a member of this family due to the elongate rostrum with teeth restricted to the distalmost portion and the robust pygostyle longer than the tarsometatarsus, among other features. It has the smallest humerus of any longypterygid, but is similar in size to Longirostravis, Rapaxavis, and Shanweiniao, which are all members of the subgroup Longirostravinae. It can be distinguished from Longipteryx, its closest relative in the subgroup Longipteryginae, by the straight (rather than curved) ventral margin of the dentary and proportionally shorter forelimbs and smaller manual unguals (hand claws).

O'Connor and colleagues identified the holotype specimen as belonging to an individual at or near maturity, as the sternum is fully ossified, and the distal tarsals are fused to the metatarsals. Dark splotches within the preserved orbit of the holotype may be traces of the eye. Abundant feather traces are preserved around much of the skeleton. As many of them have a long, narrow morphology indicative of immature feathers, the holotype individual may have been in molt when it died. Various patches of fossilized skin are preserved around the neck, fore- and hindlimbs, and tail. These traces provide information about the animal's musculature.

== Paleobiology ==
A dense, large cluster of small stones is preserved in close proximity to the posterior (toward the rear) cervical (neck) vertebrae. Specks of carbonized organic material are also observable here. Some of these represent gastroliths, or ingested stones retained in the animal's digestive tract, while several clay balls are also preserved in the mass. The density, volume, and total number of these stones are different than those preserved in the ventriculus (gizzard) region of some ornithuromorphs in the Jehol Biota, including Archaeorhynchus and Iteravis. In the latter taxa and many other birds, these gastroliths function as 'gizzard stones' in the gastric mill, aiding in digestion. Based on these features and the placement of the gastroliths in the esophagus region rather than the gizzard, O'Connor and colleagues determined these gastroliths in Chromeornis are not gizzard stones. Furthermore, a gastric mill has not been identified in any other enantiornithean specimen, despite hundreds of specimens being known.

The gastroliths of Chromeornis are not comparable to other instances of stone ingestion in modern birds (for purposes distinct from the gastric mill), such as digestive tract cleaning in predatorial birds, ballasts in penguins, and nutritional or medicinal purposes in various birds. The researchers tentatively concluded that the mass of gastroliths was the result of abnormal behavior in the holotype individual, possibly ingesting them because of an illness. This individual was likely attempting to regurgitate the mass when it became lodged in the esophagus, resulting in the animal's death via asphyxiation.

== Classification ==
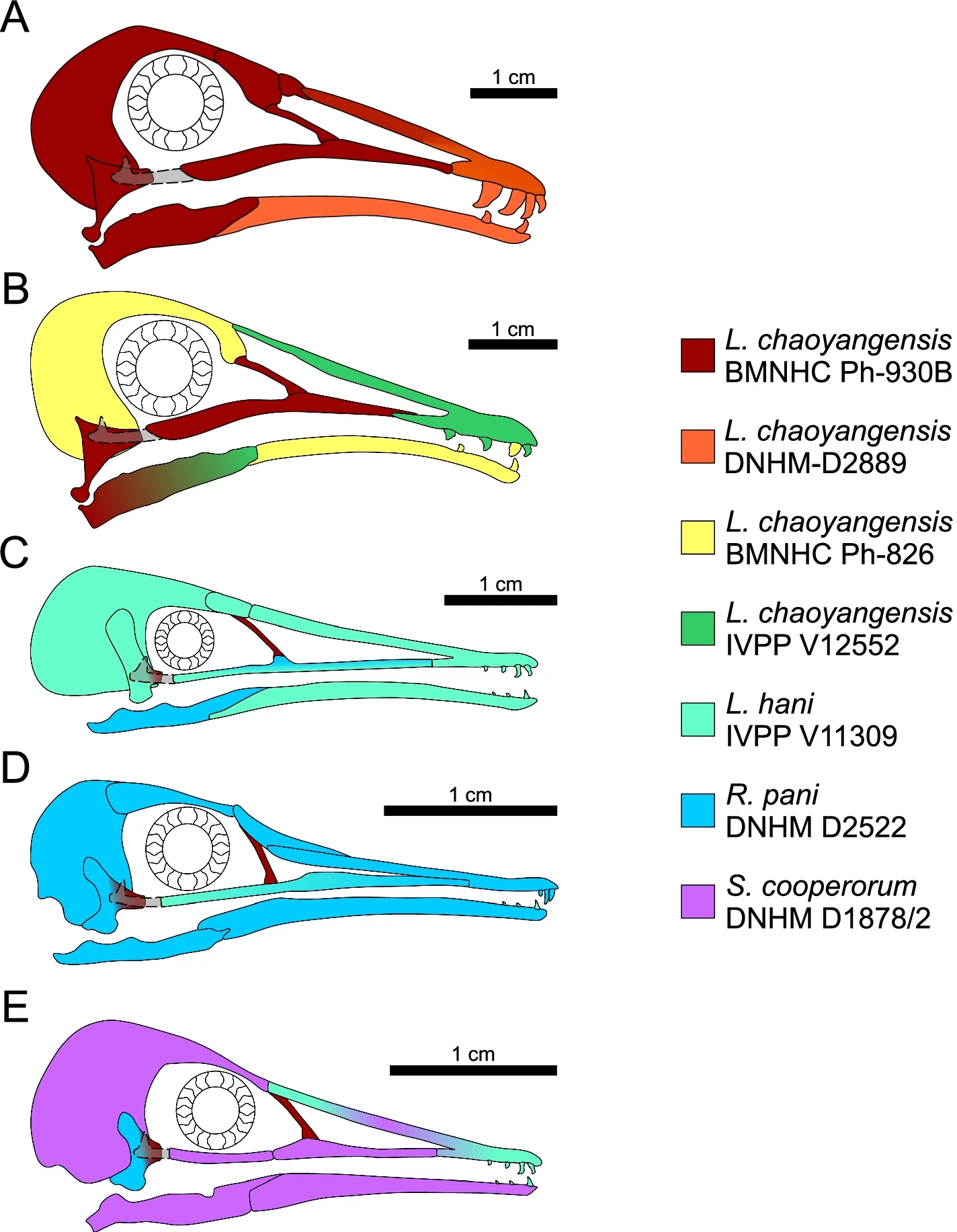
Reconstructed skulls of several longipterygids, illustrating their characteristic elongate snouts

In their 2025 phylogenetic analyses, O'Connor and colleagues recovered Chromeornis as the sister taxon to Longipteryx. In their 50% majority rule tree, these taxa formed the clade Longipteryginae, as the sister group to Longirostravinae within the more inclusive Longipterygidae. These results are displayed in the cladogram below:

- Ornithothoraces
  - Euornithes
  - †Enantiornithes
    - Protopteryx
    - - Elsornis
      - - - - Neuquenornis
            - Pengornis
          - - Eopengornis
            - Parapengornis
        - - Eoenantiornis
          - - - Gretcheniao
              - Neobohaiornis
              - Zhouornis
              - - Eocathayornis
                - Junornis
              - - Longusunguis
                - - Bohaiornis
                  - Parabohaiornis
            - - - Cathayornis
                - Concornis
                - Eoalulavis
              - - - Gobipteryx
                  - Longipterygidae
                    - Longipteryginae
                      - Chromeornis
                      - Longipteryx
                    - Longirostravinae
                      - Shanweiniao
                      - - Longirostravis
                        - Rapaxavis
                - - Fortunguavis
                  - - - Shenqiornis
                      - Sulcavis
                    - - Hebeiornis
                      - - Iberomesornis
                        - Orienantius
