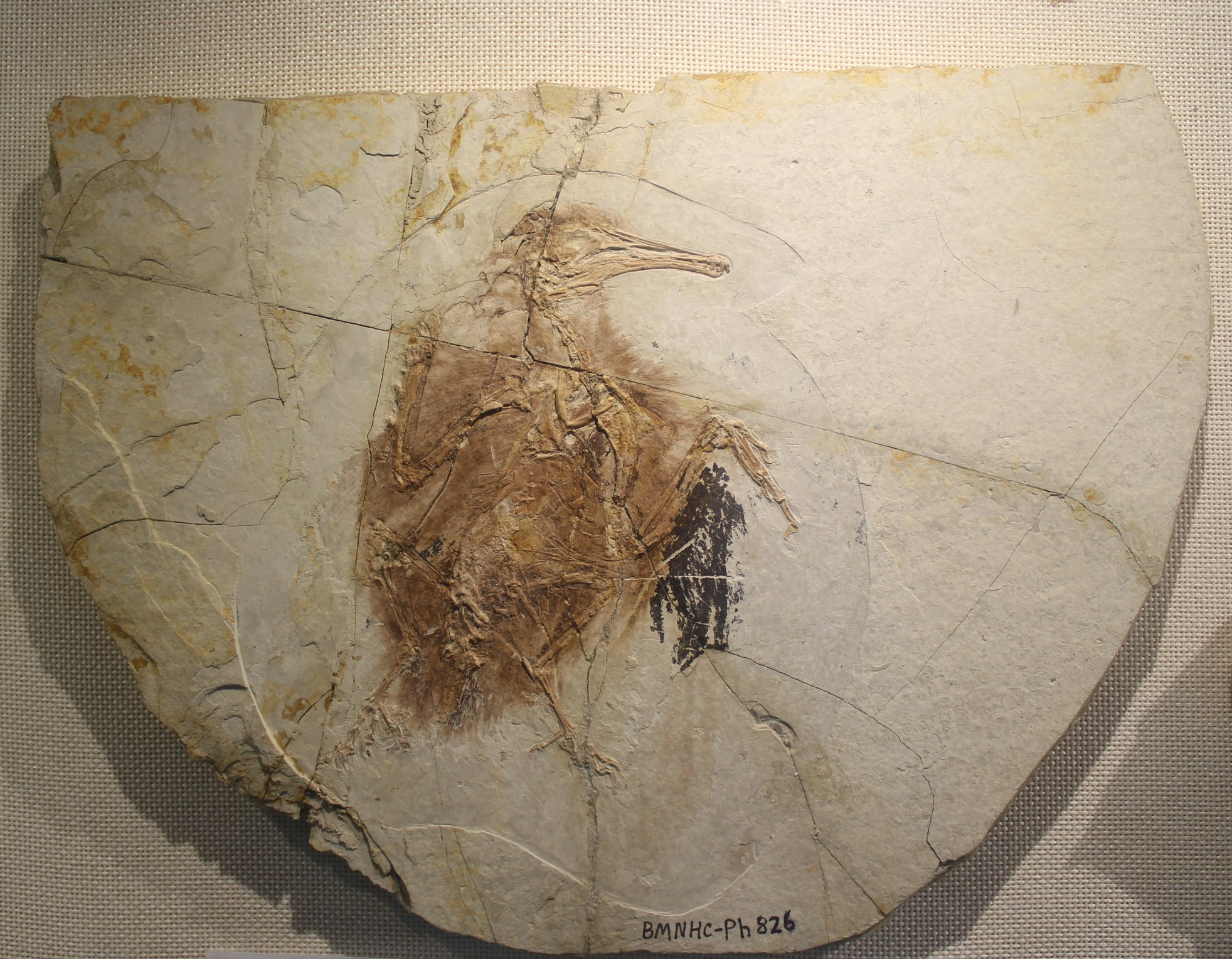
- Fossil specimen, Beijing Museum of Natural History

Scientific classification
- Kingdom: Animalia
- Phylum: Chordata
- Class: Reptilia
- Clade: Dinosauria
- Clade: Saurischia
- Clade: Theropoda
- Clade: Avialae
- Clade: †Enantiornithes
- Family: †Longipterygidae
- Genus: †Longipteryx; Zhang et al., 2001
- Species: †L. chaoyangensis

Binomial name
- †Longipteryx chaoyangensis Zhang et al., 2001

Synonyms
- Camptodontornis yangi (Li et al., 2010); Shengjingornis yangi Li et al., 2012

= Longipteryx =

Longipteryx Temporal range: Early Cretaceous, 120 Ma

Genus of birds

Longipteryx is a genus of prehistoric bird which lived during the Early Cretaceous (Aptian stage, 120.3 million years ago). It contains a single species, Longipteryx chaoyangensis. Its remains have been recovered from the Jiufotang Formation at Chaoyang in Liaoning Province, China. Apart from the holotype IVPP V 12325 - a fine and nearly complete skeleton — another entire skeleton (IPPV V 12552), some isolated bones (a humerus and furcula, specimens IPPV V 12553, and an ulna, IPPV V 12554) and many other specimens are known to date.

The name Longipteryx means "one with long feathers", from Latin longus, "long" + Ancient Greek pteryx (πτέρυξ), "wing", "feather" or "pinion". The specific name chaoyangensis is from the Latin for "from Chaoyang".

== Description ==
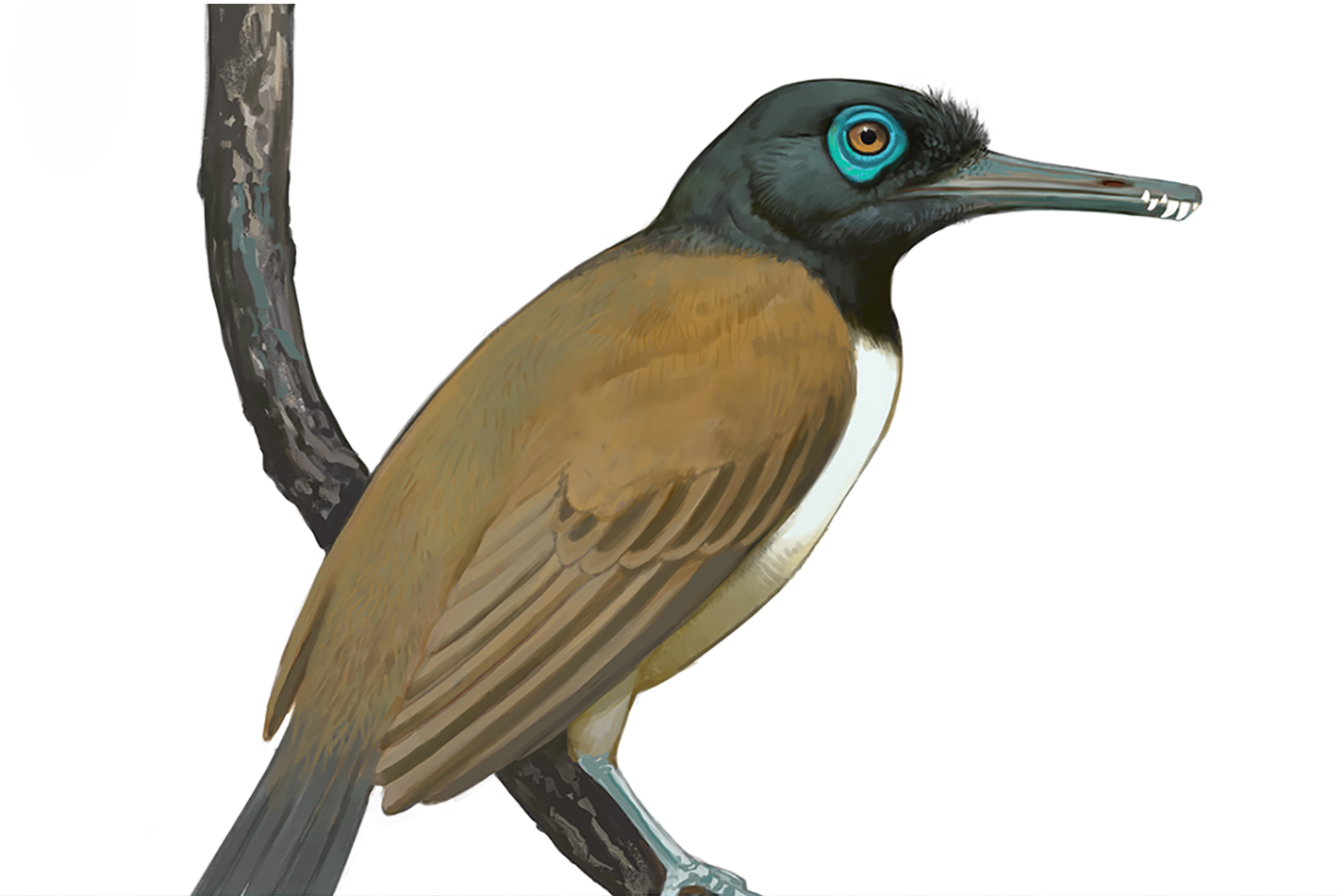
Life restoration of Longipteryx based on specimen DNHM D2889

The holotype of Longipteryx had an estimated wingspan of 46.3 cm (1.52 ft) and body mass of 193 g (6.8 oz). It had a long snout — longer than the rest of the head — with a few hooked teeth at the tip, and, as the name implies, proportionally long and strong wings. Although it was basal to the extent that it had two long separate fingers with claws and a stubby thumb, the flight apparatus was generally quite well developed, and unlike most other birds of its time it possessed uncinate processes which strengthened the ribcage. Its claws and toes were long and strong while the leg was quite short. Altogether, the ability to fly and to perch was quite sophisticated for its age, to the detriment of terrestrial locomotion: the humerus was 1.56 times the length of the femur.

=== Plumage ===
Plumage details of two L. chaoyangensis specimens

The holotype retains many feather impressions, though poorly preserved; remiges do not seem to have been preserved, and what feathers remain are apparently only body feathers, wing coverts and down. The end of the tail is destroyed in the holotype; no rectrices are preserved and while the pygostyle is complete in other skeletons, only halos of short feathers are preserved. While the related Shanweiniao and some other enantiornithines preserve two, four, or eight long display feathers on the tail, the absence of such feathers in any known specimen of Longipteryx probably indicates that they were absent in this species.

In 2026, Clark and colleagues described the plumage of Longipteryx in detail based on two new specimens. These allowed for the shape of the wings to be analyzed and compared to other taxa. The shape when folded may be comparable to Orienantius. At the time of this publication, 19 specimens had been confidently referred to this taxon, most of which preserve soft tissue traces, and none of them exhibit sexual dimorphism through tail feathers.

== Paleobiology ==
Longipteryx was frugivorous, indicated by the discovery of complete gymnosperm seeds and a lack of gastroliths within two specimens, STM8–86 and STM8–112. Initially, it was interpreted as a piscivore or an insectivore. The authors of the 2024 study who reported direct evidence of frugivory in Longipteryx suggested that researchers should be cautious when predicting the diets in extinct taxa based on "untested morphological proxies".

== Classification ==
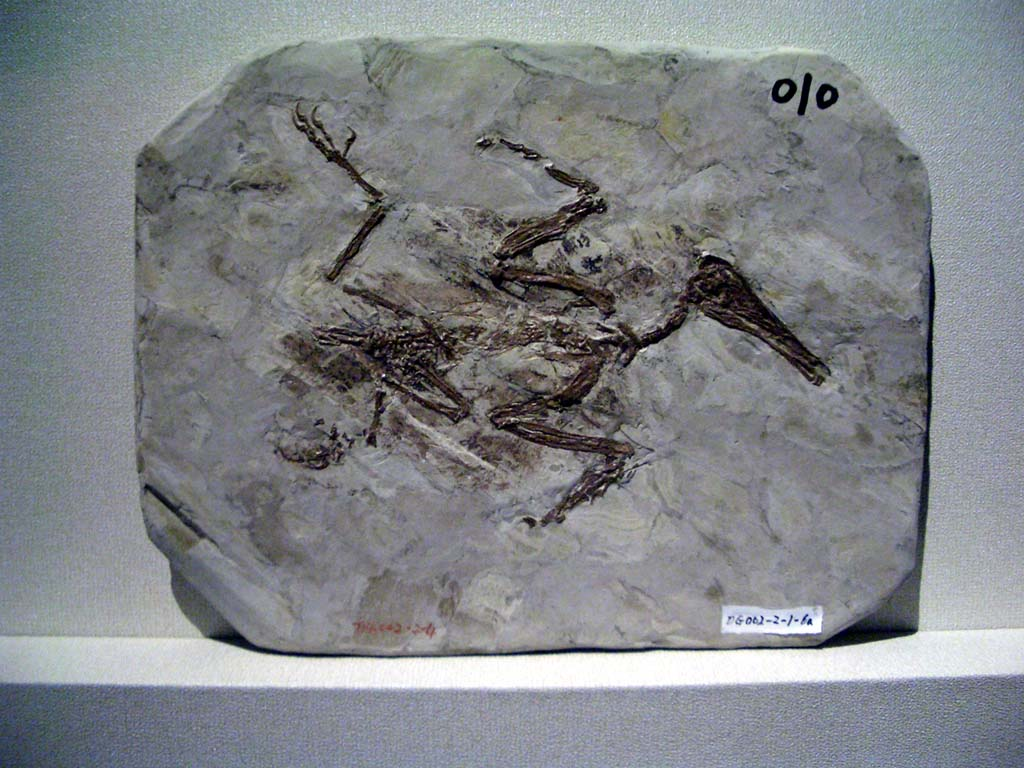
Fossil specimen, Hong Kong Science Museum

A distinct order (Longipterygiformes) and family (Longipterygidae) has been proposed for it. Given that neither its exact relationships nor any close relatives are presently known, not much can be said about the phylogenetic position of L. chaoyangensis. On the other hand, Longirostravis hani, described a few years after Longipteryx, appears to be phylogenetically closer to the present taxon than other Mesozoic birds and indeed they might constitute a clade of early specialized Euenantiornithes. If this is correct, they might well be considered as an order, in which case Longirostravisiformes and Longirostravisidae would become junior synonyms of Longipterygiformes and Longipterygidae, respectively.

In the 50% majority rule tree of the phylogenetic analysis published in their 2025 description of the longipterygid Chromeornis, O'Connor and colleagues recovered it as the sister taxon to Longipteryx, together forming the clade Longipteryginae, which is sister to the Longirostravinae. These results are displayed in the cladogram below:

- Ornithothoraces
  - Ornithuromorpha
  - †Enantiornithes
    - Protopteryx
    - - Elsornis
      - - - - Neuquenornis
            - Pengornis
          - - Eopengornis
            - Parapengornis
        - - Eoenantiornis
          - - - Gretcheniao
              - Neobohaiornis
              - Zhouornis
              - - Eocathayornis
                - Junornis
              - - Longusunguis
                - - Bohaiornis
                  - Parabohaiornis
            - - - Cathayornis
                - Concornis
                - Eoalulavis
              - - - Gobipteryx
                  - Longipterygidae
                    - Longipteryginae
                      - Chromeornis
                      - Longipteryx
                    - Longirostravinae
                      - Shanweiniao
                      - - Longirostravis
                        - Rapaxavis
                - - Fortunguavis
                  - - - Shenqiornis
                      - Sulcavis
                    - - Hebeiornis
                      - - Iberomesornis
                        - Orienantius
