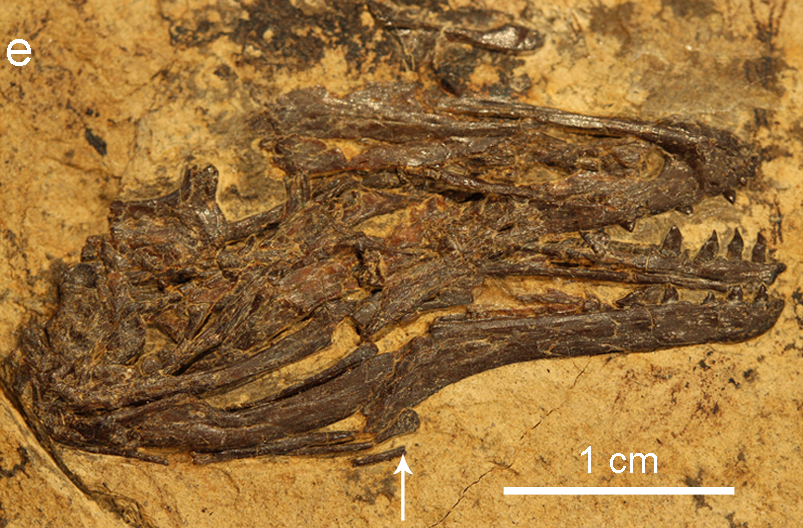
- Fossil skull

Scientific classification
- Domain: Eukaryota
- Kingdom: Animalia
- Phylum: Chordata
- Clade: Dinosauria
- Clade: Saurischia
- Clade: Theropoda
- Clade: Avialae
- Clade: †Enantiornithes
- Family: †Bohaiornithidae
- Genus: †Longusunguis; Wang et al., 2014

Type species
- †Longusunguis kurochkini Wang et al., 2014

= Longusunguis =

Longusunguis Temporal range: Early Cretaceous, 120.3 Ma

Extinct genus of dinosaurs

Longusunguis is an extinct genus of bohaiornithid enantiornithean dinosaur known from the Early Cretaceous of Liaoning Province, northeastern China. It contains a single species, Longusunguis kurochkini.

== Discovery ==
Longusunguis was first described and named by Min Wang, Zhong-He Zhou, Jingmai K. O'Connor and Nikita V. Zelenkov in 2014 and the type species is Longusunguis kurochkini. The generic name is derived from the Latin words longus, meaning "long", and unguis, meaning "claw", in reference to the distinctly elongated pedal unguals that this taxon shares with other bohaiornithids. The specific name, kurochkini, honors the late Prof. Evgeny Kurochkin, a prominent paleontologist, for his contributions to the study of fossil birds.

Longusunguis is known solely from the holotype IVPP V 17964, a complete and articulated skeleton and skull. It is preserved in a single slab and currently housed at the Institute of Vertebrate Paleontology and Paleoanthropology, Beijing. IVPP V 17964 was collected at deposits near the Lamadong Town, Jianchang County of the Liaoning Province, from the Jiufotang Formation, dated to the Aptian stage of the Early Cretaceous, approximately 120.3 million years ago.

== Description ==
Longusunguis differs from all other known bohaiornithid enantiornitheans by possessing a combination of traits, some of which are autapomorphies, i.e. unique. The maxilla of Longusunguis possesses an accessory fenestra on the jugal process. This trait is unique among bohaiornithids, as only Zhouornis possesses such fenestra, however on the dorsal process. Its lacrimal bone shows an elongate excavation on the caudal margin of its descending ramus. In Longusunguis, the lateral margin of the coracoid is more convex than in other bohaiornithids. In Longusunguis, the acromion process is strongly projecting dorsally (more than in Sulcavis), whereas in Parabohaiornis this process is straight, and is parallel to the scapular shaft. Finally, its pygostyle is longer than the tarsometatarsus. The holotype of Longusunguis came from a subadult individual, as evident by the absence of fusion in some compound bones, such as the carpometacarpus, tibiotarsus and tarsometatarsus.

== Phylogeny ==
The phylogenetic position of Longusunguis was explored by Wang et al. (2014) using a data matrix that includes 56 avialan taxa, scored based on 262 morphological traits. Longusunguis was recovered as an advanced bohaiornithid, closely related to Bohaiornis and Parabohaiornis whose specimens were collected at nearby localities, also near the Lamadong Town. The cladogram below shows the phylogenetic position of Longusunguis among the Enantiornithes following this analysis.

- Enantiornithes
  - Protopteryx
  - Elsornis
  - Iberomesornis
  - Euenantiornithes
    - Longipterygidae
      - - Boluochia
        - Longipteryx
      - - Shanweiniao
        - - Longirostravis
          - Rapaxavis
    - - - IVPP V 18631
        - Pengornis
      - - Eocathayornis
        - - - Cathayornis
            - - Neuquenornis
              - Gobipteryx
              - Vescornis
              - Eoalulavis
              - - Concornis
                - Qiliania
          - Eoenantiornithiformes
            - Eoenantiornis
            - Bohaiornithidae
              - - Shenqiornis
                - Sulcavis
              - - Zhouornis
                - - Longusunguis
                  - - Parabohaiornis
                    - Bohaiornis
