= Parabohaiornis =

Parabohaiornis Temporal range: Early Cretaceous, 120.3 Ma

Scientific classification
- Domain: Eukaryota
- Kingdom: Animalia
- Phylum: Chordata
- Clade: Dinosauria
- Clade: Saurischia
- Clade: Theropoda
- Clade: Avialae
- Clade: †Enantiornithes
- Family: †Bohaiornithidae
- Genus: †Parabohaiornis; Wang et al., 2014

Type species
- †Parabohaiornis martini Wang et al., 2014

Extinct genus of dinosaurs

Parabohaiornis is an extinct genus of bohaiornithid enantiornithean dinosaur known from the Early Cretaceous of Liaoning Province, northeastern China. It contains a single species, Parabohaiornis martini.

== Discovery ==
Parabohaiornis was first described and named by Min Wang, Zhong-He Zhou, Jingmai K. O'Connor and Nikita V. Zelenkov in 2014 and the type species is Parabohaiornis martini. The generic name combines the Latin prefix para, meaning "close to", with the generic name of Bohaiornis, the type genus of the Bohaiornithidae family, in reference to the morphological similarity between Parabohaiornis and other bohaiornithids. The specific name, martini, honors the late paleontologist Prof. Larry Dean Martin, for his contributions to the study of the evolution of birds.

Parabohaiornis is known from the holotype IVPP V 18691, a nearly complete and partially articulated skeleton and skull, and from the referred specimen IVPP V 18690, an articulated partial skeleton missing only the skull, ulna, radius and hands. Both specimens are preserved in single slabs and are currently housed at the Institute of Vertebrate Paleontology and Paleoanthropology, Beijing. The specimens were collected at deposits near the Lamadong Town, Jianchang County of the Liaoning Province, from the Jiufotang Formation, dating to the Aptian stage of the Early Cretaceous, approximately 120.3 million years ago.

== Description ==
Parabohaiornis differs from all other known bohaiornithid enantiornitheans by possessing a combination of traits. It has three and four teeth on the premaxilla and maxilla, respectively. Unlike Longusunguis, Zhouornis and Sulcavis, its nasal bone lacks a maxillary process. Unlike Sulcavis and Bohaiornis, it lacks an intercondylar incisure on the tibiotarsus. In Parabohaiornis, the acromion process is straight, and is parallel to the scapular shaft, whereas in Longusunguis and Sulcavis this process is deflected dorsally. Parabohaiornis has a distinctive length ratio of the pygostyle to the third metatarsal of 0.92–0.99, in comparison to 1.06 in Longusunguis, 0.79 in Sulcavis, 0.66 in Zhouornis and an estimated ratio of 0.82 in Bohaiornis. Finally, while in other bohaiornthids the proximal phalanx is more than 80% the length of the penultimate phalanx of the fourth digit, in Parabohaiornis it is much shorter (less than 70%). The referred specimen of Parabohaiornis is indistinguishable from the holotype in morphology, possessing all postcranial traits that distinguish this genus from other bohaiornithids. Both specimen came from subadult individuals, the referred being more mature than the holotype, as evident by the absence or degree of fusion in some compound bones, such as the carpometacarpus, tibiotarsus and tarsometatarsus.

== Phylogeny ==
The phylogenetic position of Parabohaiornis was explored by Wang et al. (2014) using a data matrix that includes 56 avialan taxa, scored based on 262 morphological traits. Parabohaiornis was recovered as an advanced bohaiornithid, closely related to Bohaiornis whose specimens were collected at a nearby locality, also near the Lamadong Town. The cladogram below shows the phylogenetic position of Parabohaiornis among the Enantiornithes following this analysis.

- Enantiornithes
  - Protopteryx
  - Elsornis
  - Iberomesornis
  - Euenantiornithes
    - Longipterygidae
      - - Boluochia
        - Longipteryx
      - - Shanweiniao
        - - Longirostravis
          - Rapaxavis
    - - - IVPP V 18631
        - Pengornis
      - - Eocathayornis
        - - - Cathayornis
            - - Neuquenornis
              - Gobipteryx
              - Vescornis
              - Eoalulavis
              - - Concornis
                - Qiliania
          - Eoenantiornithiformes
            - Eoenantiornis
            - Bohaiornithidae
              - - Shenqiornis
                - Sulcavis
              - - Zhouornis
                - - Longusunguis
                  - - Parabohaiornis
                    - Bohaiornis
