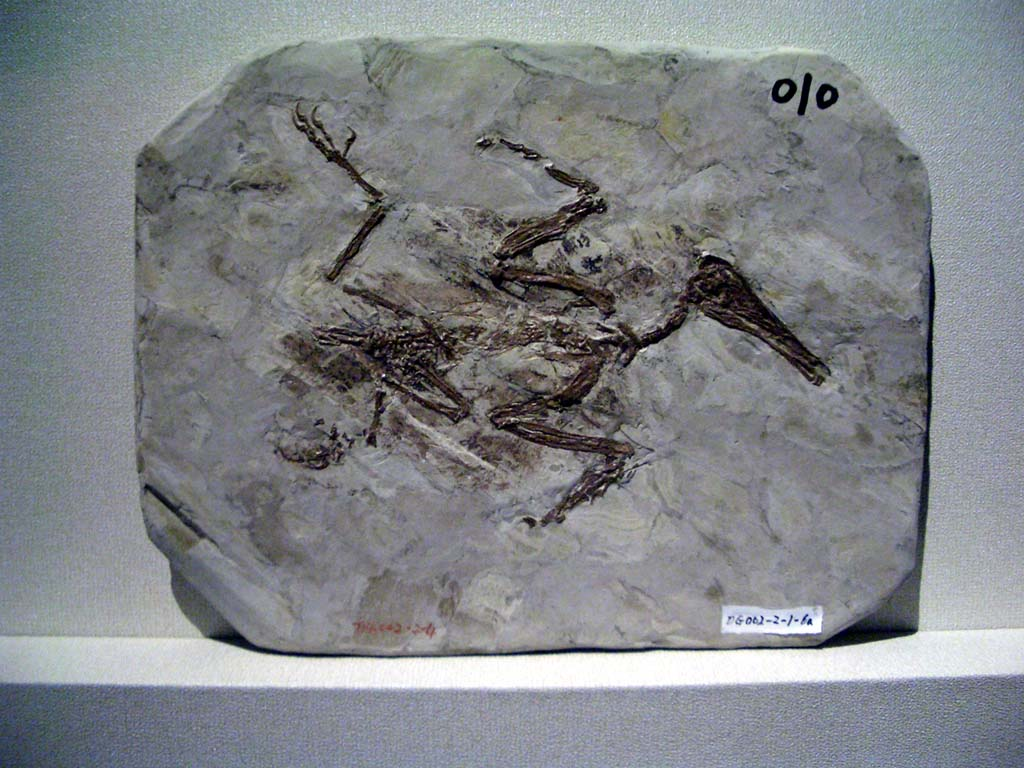
- Fossil specimen of Longipteryx chaoyangensis, Hong Kong Science Museum

Scientific classification
- Kingdom: Animalia
- Phylum: Chordata
- Class: Reptilia
- Clade: Dinosauria
- Clade: Saurischia
- Clade: Theropoda
- Clade: Avialae
- Clade: †Enantiornithes
- Family: †Longipterygidae; Zhang et al., 2001

Type species
- †Longipteryx chaoyangensis Zhang et al., 2001

Genera
- †Evgenavis?; †Gorgonavis?; †Longipteryginae; †Boluochia; †Chromeornis; †Longipteryx; †Longirostravinae; †Longirostravis; †Rapaxavis; †Shanweiniao

Synonyms
- Boluochidae Zhou & Zhang, 2006; Longipterygithidae Zhou & Zhang, 2006; Longirostravisidae Zhou & Zhang, 2006

= Longipterygidae =

Longipterygids Temporal range: Early Cretaceous, 125–120 Ma

Extinct family of avialans

Longipterygidae is an extinct family of early enantiornithean avialans from the Early Cretaceous epoch of China and possibly Spain. All definitive specimens of this family come from the Jiufotang Formation and Yixian Formation, dating to the early Aptian age, 125–120 million years ago.

== Description ==
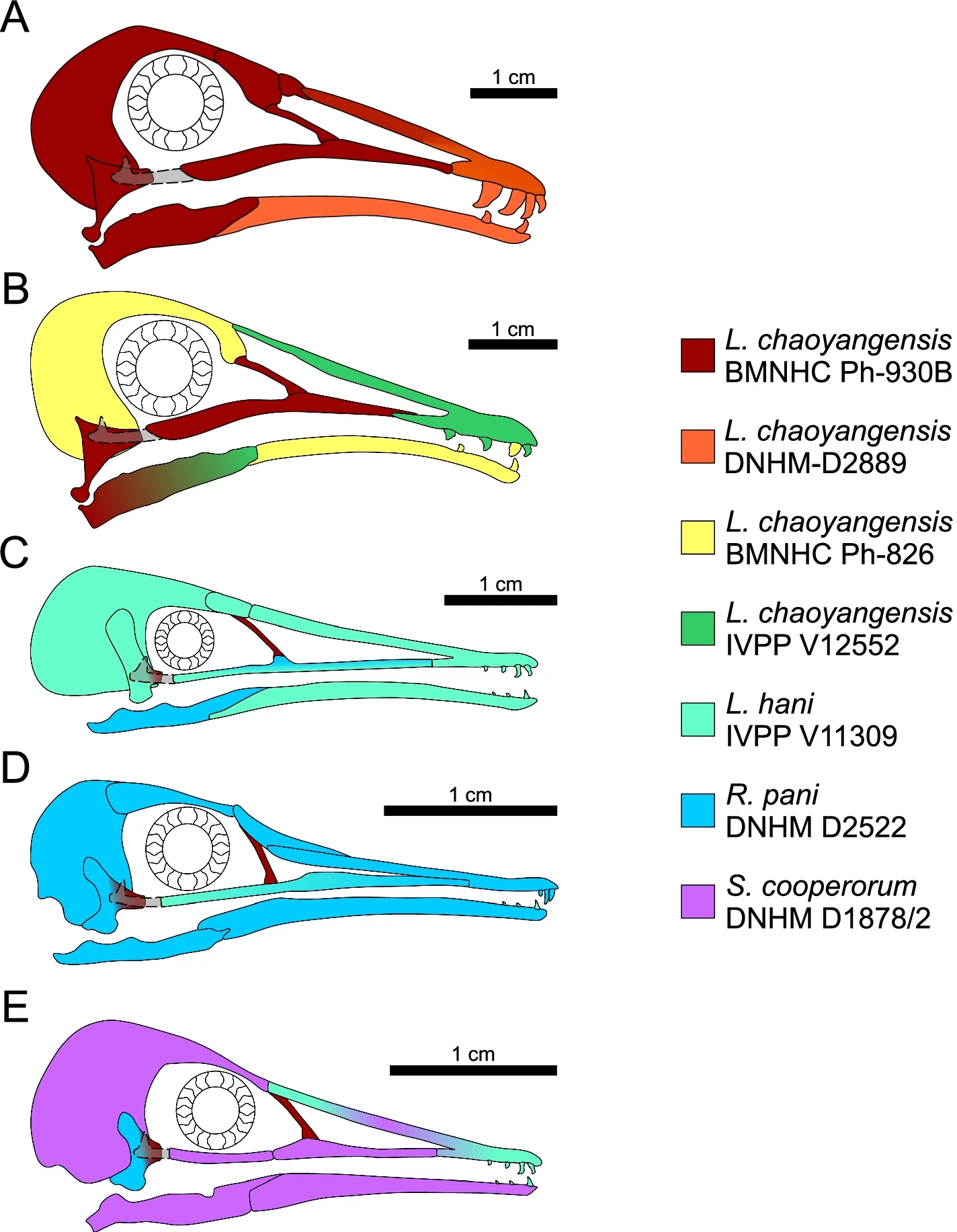
Reconstructions of the skulls of Longipteryx chaoyangensis, Longirostravis hani, Rapaxavis pani and Shanweiniao cooperorum

Longipterygids are characterized by an extremely long, toothed snout (making up over 60% of the total skull length), in which the teeth are restricted to the tips of the jaws. The snouts were straight but slightly concave at a point behind the nostrils, and the bones of the snout tip were solid. Their pygostyles, the series of fused vertebrae in the tail, were unusually large and longer than the foot bones. The feet of longipterygids were also specialized relative to other enantiornitheans. Where most enantiornitheans had a long middle toe with a "knuckle" (trochlea) that extended beyond the outer two, the toes of longipterygids were even in length, and attached to the rest of the foot at the same level. This configuration is also seen in some groups of modern birds and is usually considered an adaptation for advanced perching ability. It is likely that longipterygids lived primarily in trees. Previous interpretations of their diet are either piscivorous or insectivorous, but direct evidence from the gut content showed that Longipteryx was frugivorous, as indicated by the discovery of complete gymnosperm seeds and a lack of gastroliths within two specimens, STM8–86 and STM8–112.

== Classification ==
The Longipterygidae was first coined as a family of enantiornitheans by Zhang and colleagues in 2001. They included only the first known species, Longipteryx chaoyangensis, and placed the family in its own order, Longipterygiformes. While Longipterygiformes has never been formally defined, Longipterygidae was given a phylogenetic definition by O'Connor and colleagues in 2009. They defined the clade to include Longipteryx, Longirostravis, their most recent common ancestor, and all of its descendants. The cladogram below shows the results found in a phylogenetic analysis of O'Connor, Gao and Chiappe (2010).

- Longipterygidae
  - Longipteryx
  - Shanweiniao
  - - Rapaxavis
    - Longirostravis

In the 50% majority rule tree published in their 2025 description of the longipterygid Chromeornis, O'Connor and colleagues recovered this taxon and Longipteryx as members of the Longipteryginae (which also likely included Boluochia), while Longirostravis, Rapaxavis, and Shanweiniao were recovered in a sister group, called the Longirostravinae. These results are displayed in the cladogram below:

- Ornithothoraces
  - Ornithuromorpha
  - †Enantiornithes
    - Protopteryx
    - - Elsornis
      - - - - Neuquenornis
            - Pengornis
          - - Eopengornis
            - Parapengornis
        - - Eoenantiornis
          - - - Gretcheniao
              - Neobohaiornis
              - Zhouornis
              - - Eocathayornis
                - Junornis
              - - Longusunguis
                - - Bohaiornis
                  - Parabohaiornis
            - - - Cathayornis
                - Concornis
                - Eoalulavis
              - - - Gobipteryx
                  - Longipterygidae
                    - Longipteryginae
                      - Chromeornis
                      - Longipteryx
                    - Longirostravinae
                      - Shanweiniao
                      - - Longirostravis
                        - Rapaxavis
                - - Fortunguavis
                  - - - Shenqiornis
                      - Sulcavis
                    - - Hebeiornis
                      - - Iberomesornis
                        - Orienantius
