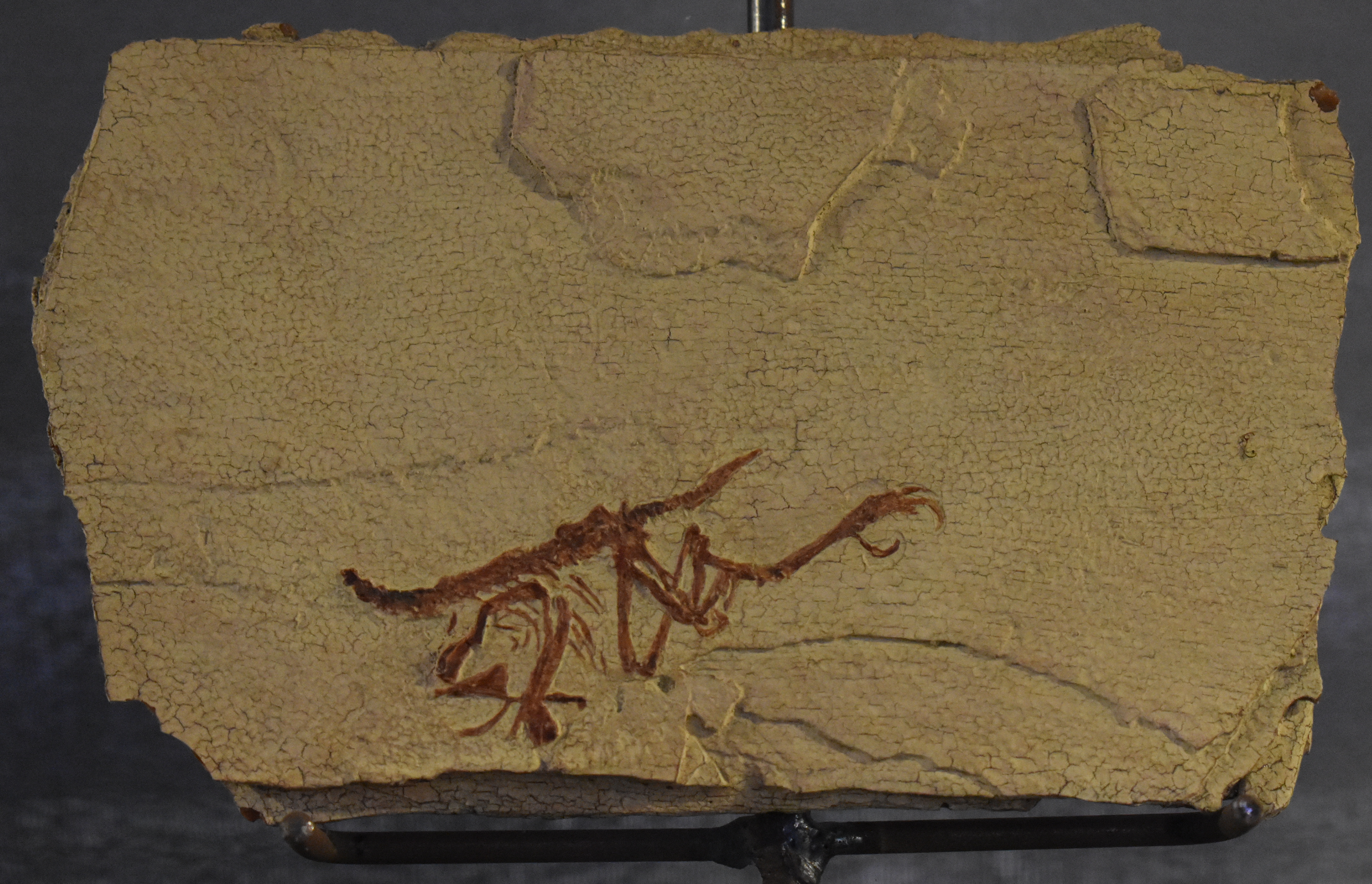
- Cast of the holotype

Scientific classification
- Kingdom: Animalia
- Phylum: Chordata
- Class: Reptilia
- Clade: Dinosauria
- Clade: Saurischia
- Clade: Theropoda
- Clade: Avialae
- Clade: †Enantiornithes
- Order: †Iberomesornithiformes
- Family: †Iberomesornithidae
- Genus: †Iberomesornis; Sanz & Bonaparte, 1992
- Species: †I. romerali

Binomial name
- †Iberomesornis romerali Sanz & Bonaparte, 1992

= Iberomesornis =

Iberomesornis Temporal range: Early Cretaceous, 125 Ma

Extinct genus of birds

Iberomesornis ("Iberian intermediate bird") is a monotypic genus of enantiornithine bird of the Cretaceous of Spain.

== Discovery ==
In 1985 the fossil of Iberomesornis was discovered by Armando Díaz Romeral in the Early Cretaceous Calizas de La Huérguina Formation at Las Hoyas, Cuenca Province, east central Spain, which dates to the late Barremian, roughly 125 million years ago. The find was first reported in 1988. In 1992 the type species Iberomesornis romerali was named and described by José Luis Sanz and José Fernando Bonaparte. The generic name is derived from Iberia and Ancient Greek μέσος, mesos, "middle", and ὄρνις, ornis, "bird", in reference to the intermediate status between the most basal and the modern birds. The specific name honours Romeral.

The holotype specimen, LH-22, part of the Las Hoyas Collection, consists of a compressed articulated partial skeleton of an adult individual lacking the skull, the anterior neck and most of the hands. A second specimen, LH-8200, was referred to a Iberomesornis sp. in 1994, consisting of the left foot of an individual similar in size to the holotype. After further preparation of the fossil, the species was redescribed by Paul Sereno in 2000.

== Biology and ecology ==
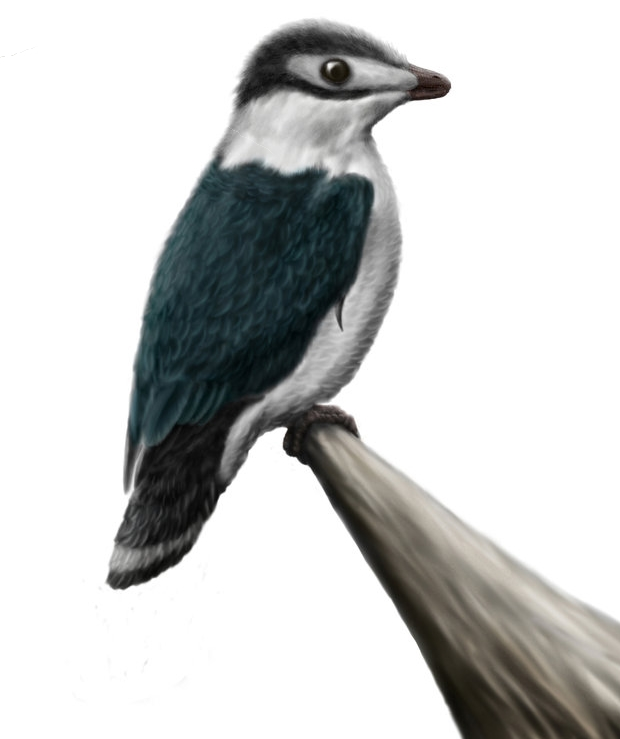
Restoration

Iberomesornis was quite small, no bigger than a large modern sparrow. On the assumption it had relatively short wings, the wingspan was about twenty centimetres; its weight has been estimated at fifteen to twenty grammes. It bore a single claw on each wing. The preserved axial column length is eighty-seven millimetres. Its ribcage was not strengthened by ossified uncinate processes but cartilaginous processes were likely present.

The Las Hoyas Unit 3 site was once a forest surrounding a lake; the climate was warm with a distinct dry season. Since the skull is not known, the diet of Iberomesornis remains a subject of guesswork. It perhaps hunted insects and other small animals, plucking them out of the air or from the ground. It may have preferred to live near lakes, catching insects from the water's surface. When resting, it used its strong, clawed feet to perch on branches; the toes are long with curved claws and a low and long hallux improved the grasping ability.

== Phylogeny ==
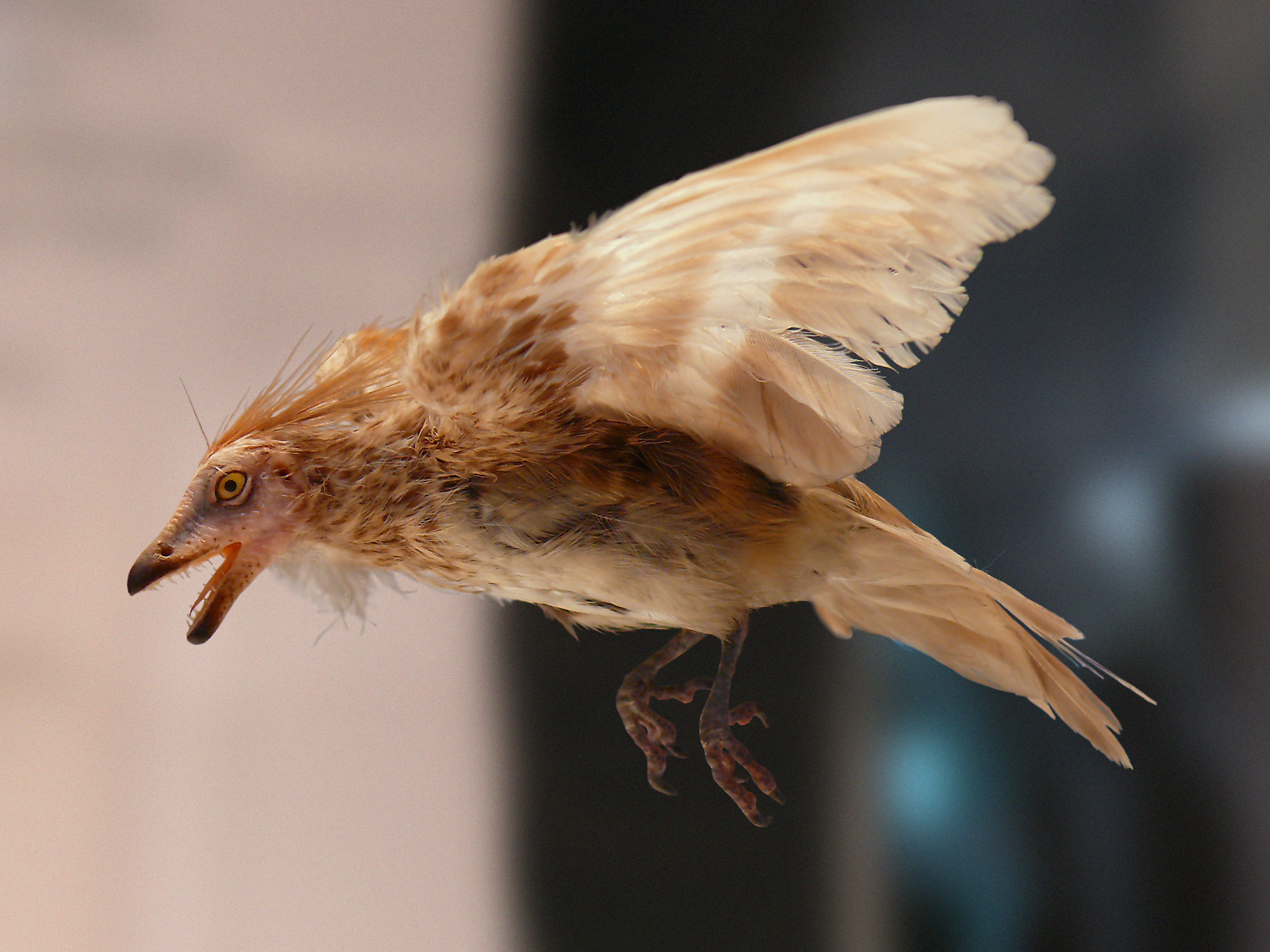
The outdated model, Museo Nacional de Ciencias Naturales, Madrid

Iberomesornis romerali was more derived physically than Archaeopteryx. The basal characteristic of a long tail had been lost and the coracoid was longer. The vertebrate column of Iberomesornis ended in a pygostyle: a splint of bone made of fused tail vertebrae that supports the tail feathers. The shorter tail and the higher position of the shoulder indicated by the strut-like coracoid — allowing for a greater wing amplitude — improved manoeuvrability, turning and swooping at speed. Flying speed may have been impaired due to the lack of a bony keel on the sternum as attachment for the flight muscles; it is uncertain whether a true foramen triosseum was present, through which a tendon could elevate and supinate the wing.

In 1992 Iberomesornis was assigned to the Iberomesornithidae. At that time it was considered to possibly have been very basal, outside of the clade Ornithothoraces, as is reflected by its generic name. However, since the discovery of Iberomesornis, many more bird fossils have come to light in the quarries of Liaoning province, China. Well preserved specimens of Chinese species such as Sinornis and Confuciusornis have permitted scientists to better understand the birds' early fossil history. Today, Iberomesornis is seen as positioned within Ornithothoraces, as a basal member of the Enantiornithes.

Below is a phylogeny showing the position of Iberomesornis within Enantiornithes according to Castro-Terol et al., 2025:

- - Dromaeosauridae
  - Aves
    - Archaeopteryx
    - - Jeholornis
      - Pygostylia
        - Confuciusornithiformes
          - Eoconfuciusornis
          - - Changchengornis
            - Confuciusornis
        - Sapeornis
        - Ornithothoraces
          - Enantiornithes
            - Pengornithidae
              - Eopengornis
              - - Pengornis
                - Chiappeavis
            - - - Vescornis
                - - Parabohaiornis
                  - Bohaiornis
              - - Enantiophoenix
                - - - Qiliania
                    - - - Feitianius
                        - Shenqiornis
                      - - Neuquenornis
                        - Elsornis
                  - - - Yuornis
                      - Gobipteryx
                    - - Eoenantiornis
                      - - - Concornis
                          - - Eocathayornis
                            - - Eoalulavis
                              - Cathayornis
                        - - Iberomesornis
                          - Longipterygidae
                            - - Shanweiniao
                              - Longipteryx
                            - - Rapaxavis
                              - Longirostravis
          - Ornithuromorpha
            - Archaeorhynchus
            - - - Schizooura
                - Patagopteryx
              - - Mengciusornis
                - - - Longicrusavis
                    - Yanornis
                  - - Eogranivora
                    - - Dingavis
                      - - Gansus
                        - - - Xinghaiornis
                            - Apsaravis
                          - - Hesperornis
                            - - Ichthyornis
                              - Neornithes
                                - Gallus
                                - Anas

== Sources ==
- Haines, Tim; Chambers, Paul (2006). The Complete Guide to Prehistoric Life. Canada: Firefly Books.
