= Evolution of birds =

Derivation of birds from a dinosaur precursor

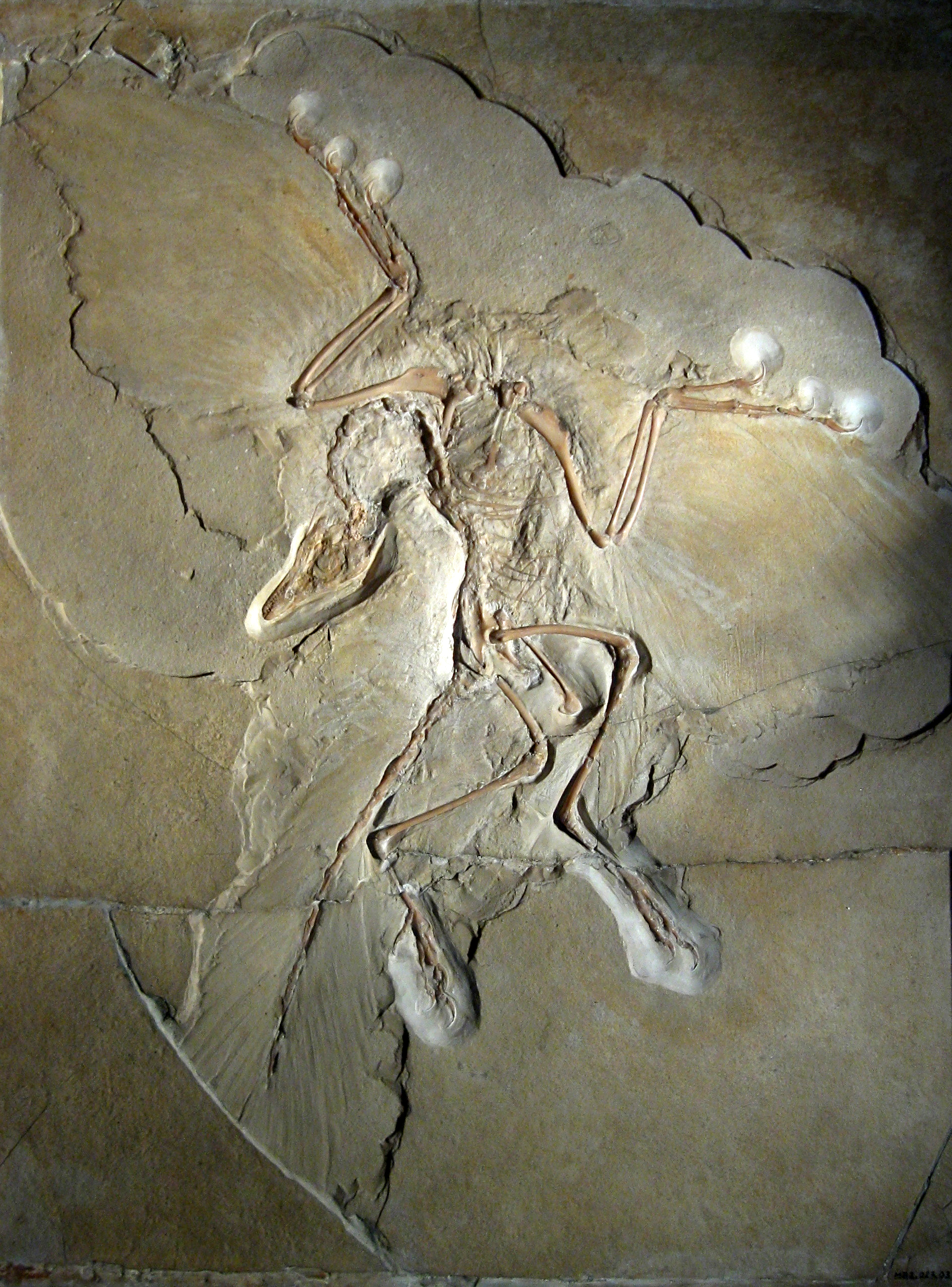
Archaeopteryx, a basal member of Avialae

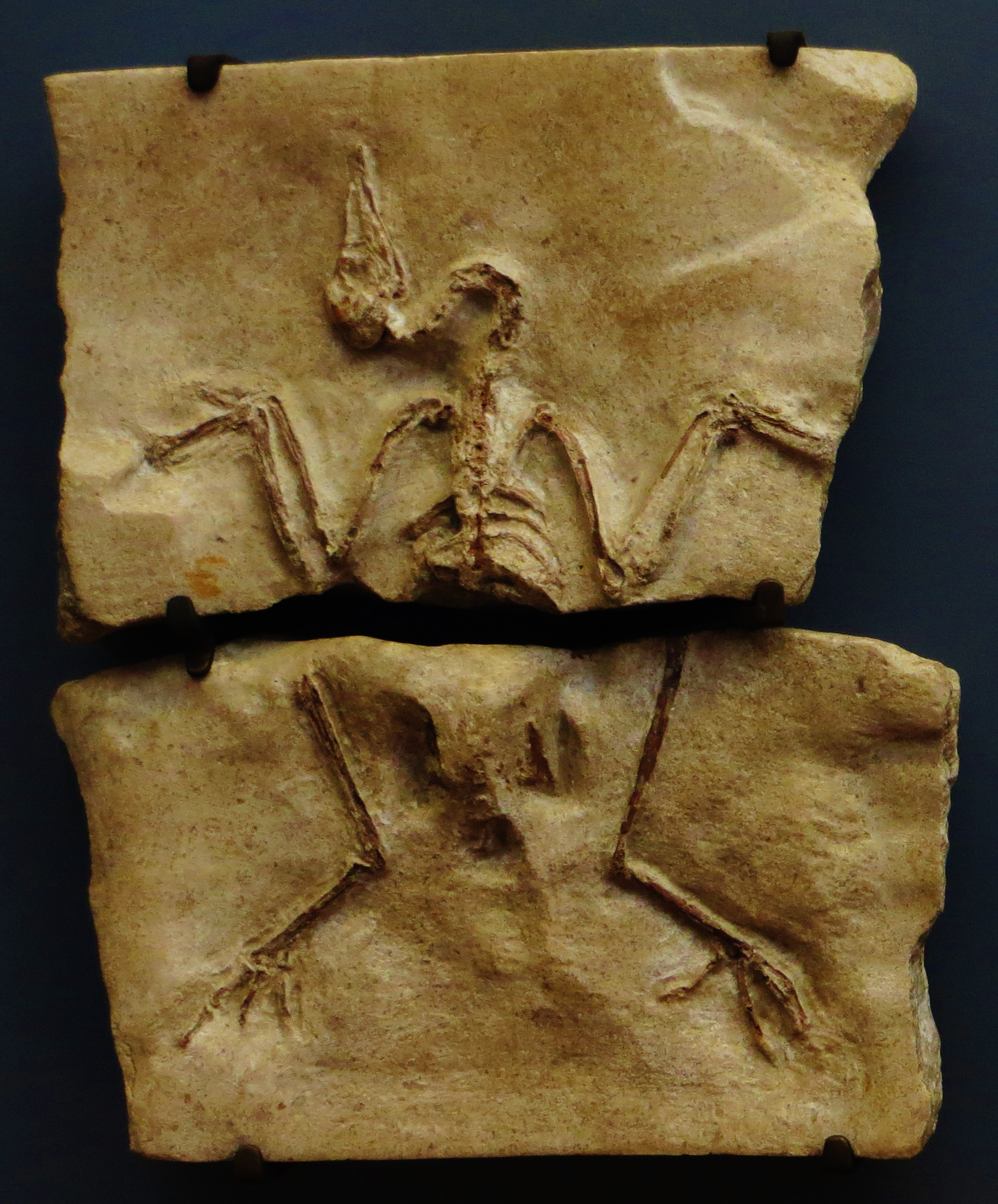
Ludiortyx, a fossil bird genus of the Cenozoic

The evolution of birds began in the Jurassic Period, with the earliest birds derived from a clade of theropod dinosaurs named Paraves. Birds are categorized as a biological class, Aves. For more than a century, the small theropod dinosaur Archaeopteryx lithographica from the Late Jurassic period was considered to have been the earliest bird. Modern phylogenies place birds in the dinosaur clade Theropoda. According to the current consensus, Aves and a sister group, the order Crocodilia, together are the sole living members of an unranked reptile clade, the Archosauria. Four distinct lineages of bird survived the Cretaceous–Paleogene extinction event 66 million years ago, giving rise to ostriches and relatives (Palaeognathae), waterfowl (Anseriformes), ground-living fowl (Galliformes), and "modern birds" (Neoaves).

Phylogenetically, Aves is usually defined as all descendants of the most recent common ancestor of a specific modern bird species (such as the house sparrow, Passer domesticus), and either Archaeopteryx, or some prehistoric species closer to Neornithes (to avoid the problems caused by the unclear relationships of Archaeopteryx to other theropods). If the latter classification is used then the larger group is termed Avialae. Currently, the relationship between non-avian dinosaurs, Archaeopteryx, and modern birds is still under debate.

== Origins ==
There is significant evidence that birds emerged within theropod dinosaurs, specifically, that birds are members of Maniraptora, a group of theropods which includes dromaeosaurs and oviraptorids, among others. As more non-avian theropods that are closely related to birds are discovered, the formerly clear distinction between non-birds and birds becomes less so. This was noted in the 19th century, with Thomas Huxley writing:

We have had to stretch the definition of the class of birds so as to include birds with teeth and birds with paw-like fore limbs and long tails. There is no evidence that Compsognathus possessed feathers; but, if it did, it would be hard indeed to say whether it should be called a reptilian bird or an avian reptile.

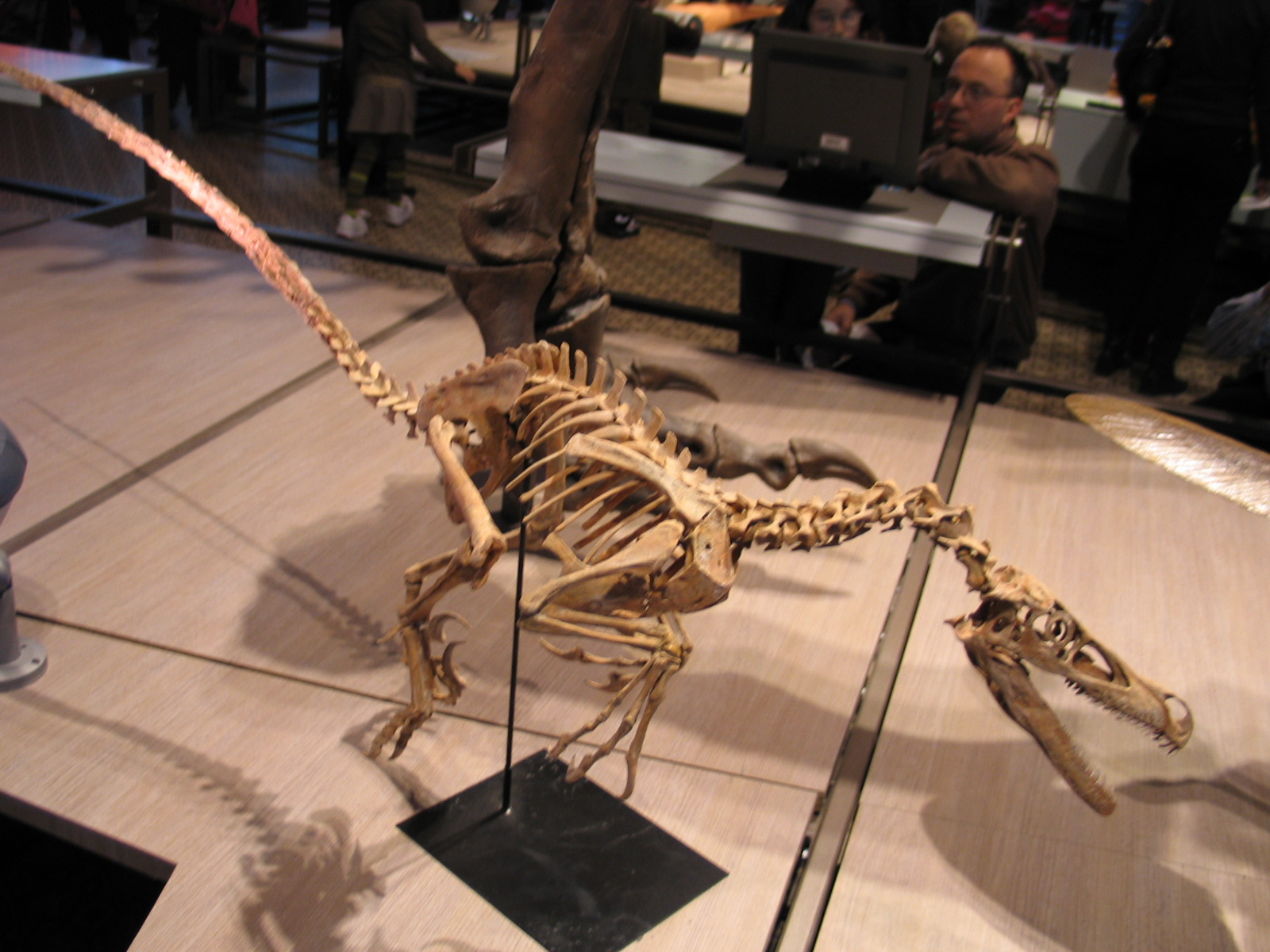
The mounted skeleton of a Velociraptor, showing the very bird-like quality of the smaller theropod dinosaurs

Discoveries in northeast China (Liaoning Province) demonstrate that many small theropod dinosaurs did indeed have feathers, among them the compsognathid Sinosauropteryx and the microraptorian dromaeosaurid Sinornithosaurus. This has contributed to this ambiguity of where to draw the line between birds and reptiles. Cryptovolans, a dromaeosaurid found in 2002 (which may be a junior synonym of Microraptor) was capable of powered flight, possessing a sternal keel and ribs with uncinate processes. Cryptovolans seems to make a better "bird" than Archaeopteryx which lacks some of these modern bird features. Because some basal members of Dromaeosauridae, including Microraptor, were capable of powered flight, some paleontologists have suggested that dromaeosaurids are actually derived from a flying ancestor, and that the larger members became secondarily flightless, mirroring the loss of flight in modern paleognaths like the ostrich. The discoveries of further basal dromaeosaurids potentially capable of powered flight, such as Xiaotingia, has provided more evidence for the theory that flight was first developed in the bird line by early dromaeosaurids rather than later by Aves as was previously supposed.

Although ornithischian (bird-hipped) dinosaurs share the same hip structure as birds, birds actually originated from the saurischian (lizard-hipped) dinosaurs if the dinosaurian origin theory is correct. They thus arrived at their hip structure condition independently. In fact, a bird-like hip structure also developed a third time among a peculiar group of theropods, the Therizinosauridae.

An alternate theory to the dinosaurian origin of birds, espoused by a few scientists, notably Larry Martin and Alan Feduccia, states that birds (including maniraptoran "dinosaurs") evolved from early archosaurs like Longisquama. This theory is contested by most other paleontologists and experts in feather development and evolution.

== Mesozoic birds ==
The basal bird Archaeopteryx, from the Jurassic, is well known as one of the first "missing links" to be found in support of evolution in the late 19th century. Though it is not considered a direct ancestor of modern birds, it gives a fair representation of how flight evolved and how the very first bird might have looked. It may be predated by Protoavis texensis, though the fragmentary nature of this fossil leaves it open to considerable doubt whether this was a bird ancestor. The skeleton of all early bird candidates is basically that of a small theropod dinosaur with long, clawed hands, though the exquisite preservation of the Solnhofen Plattenkalk shows Archaeopteryx was covered in feathers and had wings. While Archaeopteryx and its relatives may not have been very good fliers, they would at least have been competent gliders, setting the stage for the evolution of life on the wing.

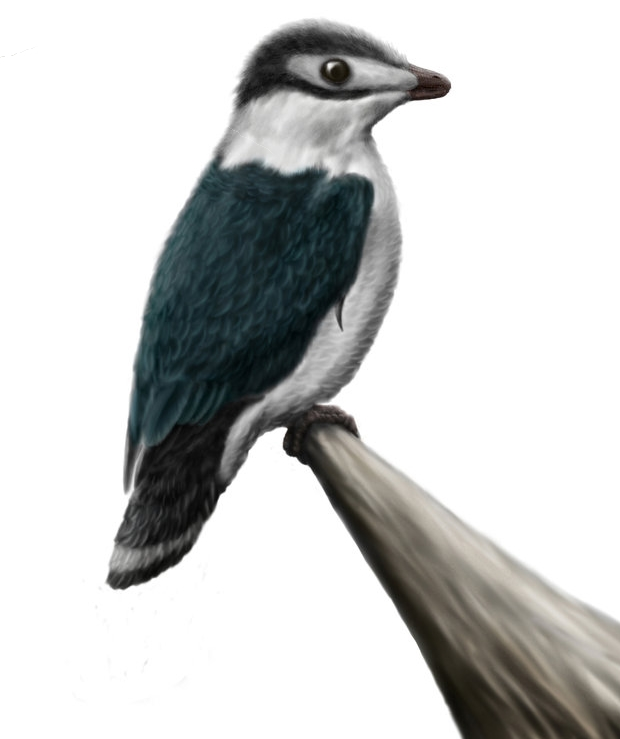
Reconstruction of Iberomesornis romerali, a toothed enantiornithine

The evolutionary trend among birds has been the reduction of anatomical elements to save weight. The first element to disappear was the bony tail, being reduced to a pygostyle and the tail function taken over by feathers. Confuciusornis is an example of their trend. While keeping the clawed fingers, perhaps for climbing, it had a pygostyle tail, though longer than in modern birds. A large group of birds, the Enantiornithes, evolved into ecological niches similar to those of modern birds and flourished throughout the Mesozoic. Though their wings resembled those of many modern bird groups, they retained the clawed wings and a snout with teeth rather than a beak in most forms. The loss of a long tail was followed by a rapid evolution of their legs which evolved to become highly versatile and adaptable tools that opened up new ecological niches.

The Cretaceous saw the rise of more modern birds with a more rigid ribcage with a carina and shoulders able to allow for a powerful upstroke, essential to sustained powered flight. Another improvement was the appearance of an alula, used to achieve better control of landing or flight at low speeds. They also had a more derived pygostyle, with a ploughshare-shaped end. An early example is Yanornis. Many were coastal birds, strikingly resembling modern shorebirds, like Ichthyornis, or ducks, like Gansus. Some evolved as swimming hunters, like the Hesperornithiformes – a group of flightless divers resembling grebes and loons. While modern in most respects, most of these birds retained typical reptilian-like teeth and sharp claws on the manus.

The modern toothless birds evolved from the toothed ancestors in the Cretaceous. Meanwhile, the earlier primitive birds, particularly the Enantiornithes, continued to thrive and diversify alongside the pterosaurs through this geologic period until they became extinct due to the K–T extinction event. All but a few groups of the toothless Neornithes were also cut short. The surviving lineages of birds were the comparatively primitive Palaeognathae (ostrich and its allies), the aquatic duck lineage, the terrestrial fowl, and the highly volant Neoaves.

== Radiation of modern birds ==
Modern birds probably originated at the end of Early Cretaceous or at the beginning of the Late Cretaceous. They are split into the paleognaths and neognaths. The paleognaths include the tinamous (grouse-like birds, found only in Central and South America) and the ratites, which nowadays are found almost exclusively in the Southern Hemisphere. The ratites are large flightless birds, and include ostriches, rheas, cassowaries, kiwis and emus. The ratites are a paraphyletic (artificial) grouping because tinamous are part of their evolutionary clade and they have likely lost the ability to fly independently, becoming an example of convergent evolution. However, the evidence about their evolution is still ambiguous, partly because there are no uncontroversial fossils from the Mesozoic and partly because their phylogenetic relationships are still uncertain.

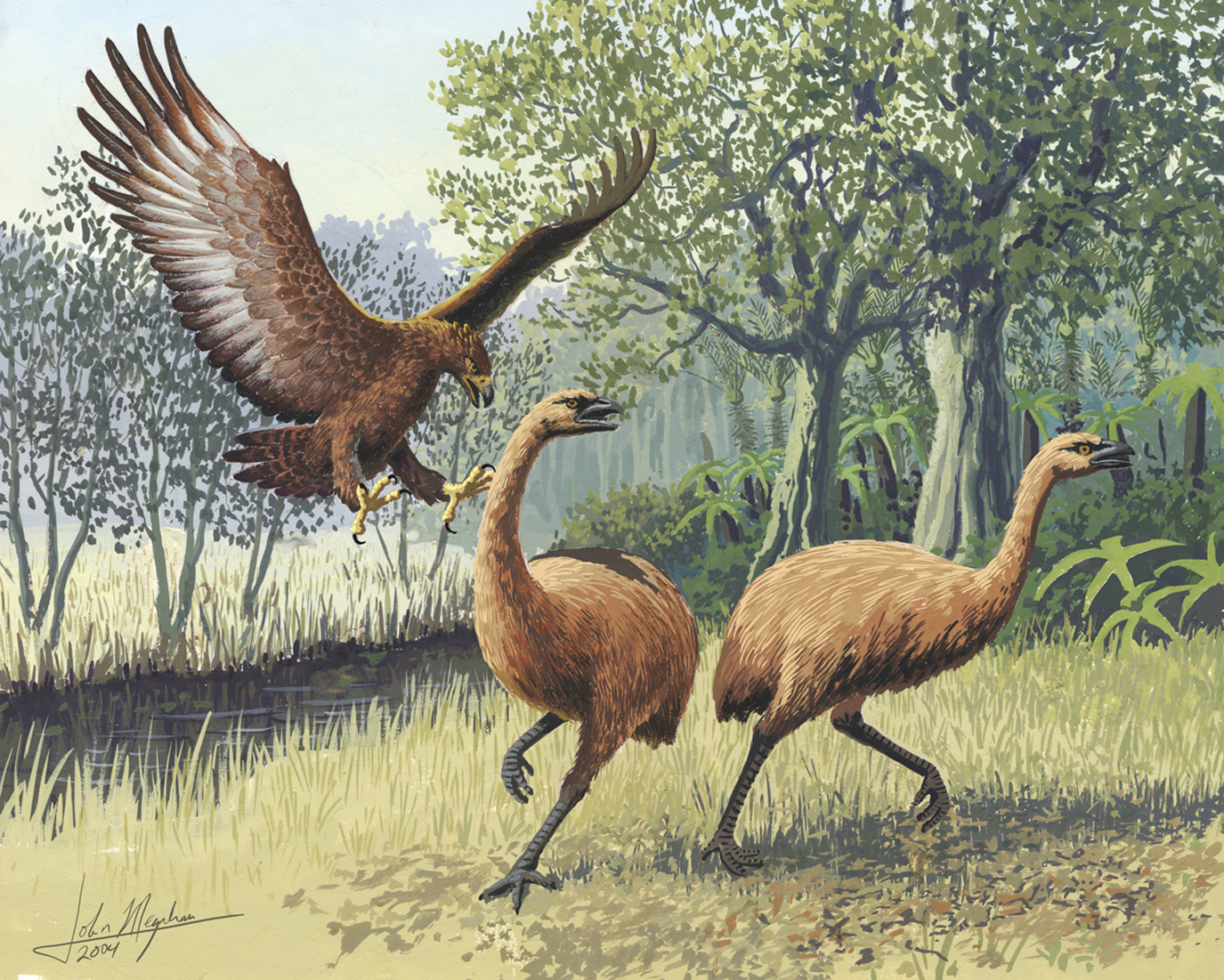
Haast's eagle and moa in New Zealand; the eagle is a neognath, the moa are paleognaths.

The basal divergence within Neognathes is between Galloanserae and Neoaves.

The timing of divergence of these major groups are a matter of debate. It is agreed that modern birds originated in the Cretaceous and that the split between Galloanserae and Neoaves occurred before the Cretaceous–Paleogene extinction event, but there are different opinions about whether the radiation of the remaining neognaths occurred before or after the extinction event. This disagreement is in part caused by a divergence in the evidence, with molecular dating suggesting a Cretaceous radiation and the fossil record suggesting a Paleogene radiation. A 2015 study attempting to reconcile the molecular and fossil evidence estimated the most recent common ancestor of modern birds at 95 million years ago and the split between Galloanseres and Neoaves at 85 million years ago. Notably, these studies show that the rapid proliferation of lineages in Neoaves seems to coincide with the Cretaceous–Paleogene extinction event, suggesting a role for ecological opportunity stimulating diversification in the aftermath of the mass extinction.

In contrast, a 2024 genomic study suggests that the Galloanserae and Neoaves diverged around the Early-Late Cretaceous boundary (100.5 million years ago), with the paleognaths and neognaths diverging even earlier (around 130 million years ago), and that most terrestrial neoavian orders gradually diverged from one another throughout the Late Cretaceous, roughly in sync with the concurrent radiation of flowering plants. This would suggest that a majority of all terrestrial avian orders coexisted with the non-avian dinosaurs and are K-Pg extinction survivors. In contrast, most major radiations of seabirds and shorebirds (as well as in paleognaths, despite their ancient origins) were found to have only occurred after the K-Pg extinction event, and primarily after the Paleocene–Eocene Thermal Maximum. This clashes with previous studies that found a very rapid radiation of avian orders only after the K-Pg extinction. The results of this study have been disputed by other researchers, due to a lack of fossil evidence to support its conclusions.

The birds that survived the end-of-Cretaceous extinction were likely ground-dwelling (not arboreal) and thus persisted despite the worldwide destruction of forests.

An analysis of the variation of diversification rates through time further revealed a potential effect of climate on the evolution diversification rates in birds in which the generation of new lineages accelerates during periods of global cooling. This can be the result of climate cooling fragmenting tropical biomes and producing widespread allopatric speciation plus an effect of some lineages diversifying in the expanding arid and cool biomes.

Bird skull evolution decelerated compared with the evolution of their dinosaur predecessors after the Cretaceous–Paleogene extinction event, rather than accelerating as often believed to have caused the cranial shape diversity of modern birds.

== Classification of modern species ==
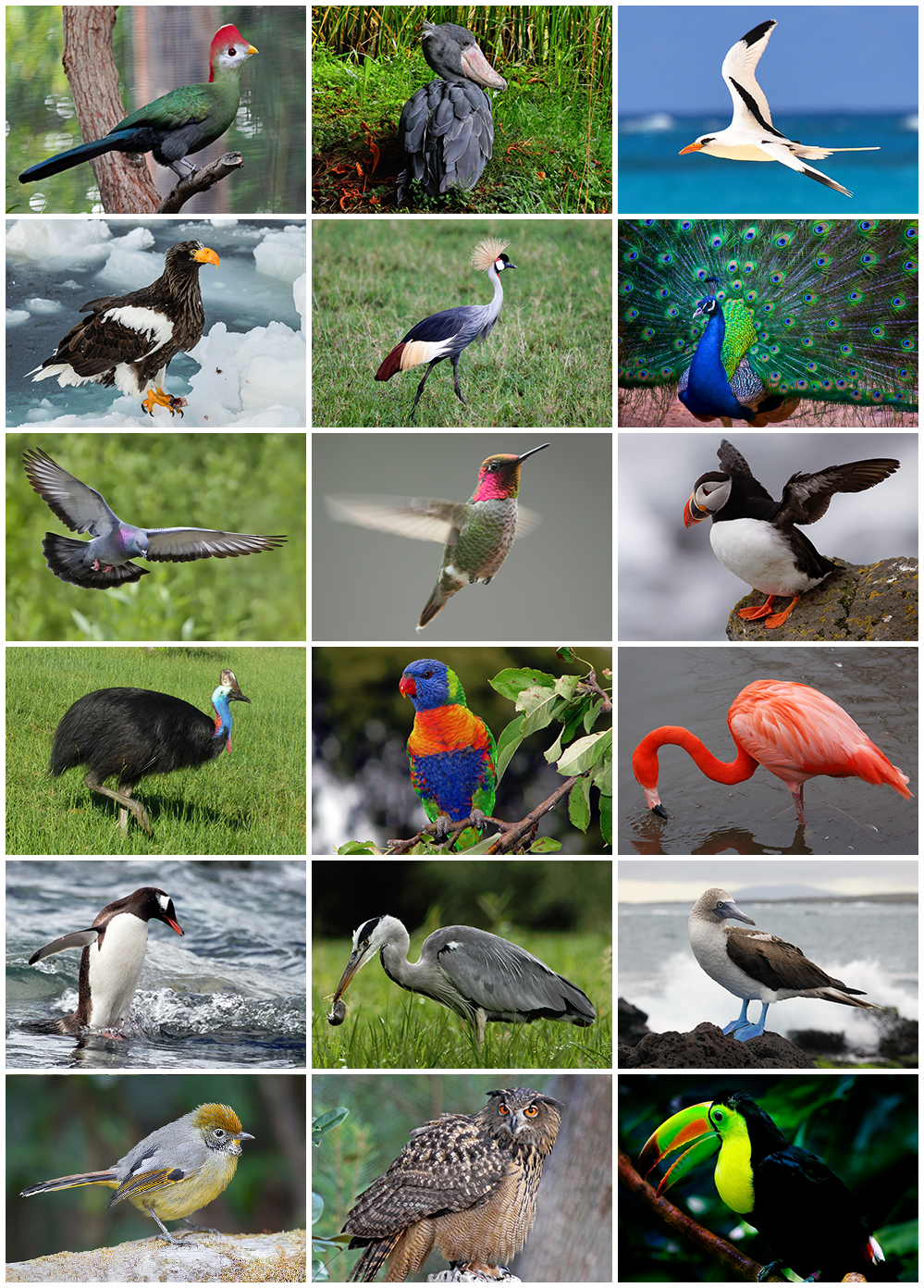
The diversity of modern birds

The phylogenetic classification of birds is a contentious issue. Sibley & Ahlquist's Phylogeny and Classification of Birds (1990) is a landmark work on the classification of birds (although frequently debated and constantly revised). A preponderance of evidence suggests that most modern bird orders constitute good clades. However, scientists are not in agreement as to the precise relationships between the main clades. Evidence from modern bird anatomy, fossils and DNA have all been brought to bear on the problem but no strong consensus has emerged.

Structural characteristics and fossil records have historically provided enough data for systematists to form hypotheses regarding the phylogenetic relationships between birds. Imprecisions within these methods is the main factor for why a lack of exact knowledge with regards to the orders and families of birds exists. Expansions in the study of computer-generated DNA sequencing and computer generated phylogenetics has provided a more accurate method for classifying bird species - although DNA data studying can only go so far, and questions are still unanswered.

== Current evolutionary trends in birds ==
Evolution generally occurs at a scale far too slow to be witnessed by humans. However, bird species are currently going extinct at a far greater rate than any possible speciation or other generation of new species. The disappearance of a population, subspecies, or species represents the permanent loss of a range of genes.

Another concern with evolutionary implications is a suspected increase in hybridization. This may arise from human alteration of habitats enabling related allopatric species to overlap. Forest fragmentation can create extensive open areas, connecting previously isolated patches of open habitat. Populations that were isolated for sufficient time to diverge significantly, but not sufficient to be incapable of producing fertile offspring may now be interbreeding so broadly that the integrity of the original species may be compromised. For example, the many hybrid hummingbirds found in northwest South America may represent a threat to the conservation of the distinct species involved.

Several species of birds have been bred in captivity to create variations on wild species. In some birds this is limited to color variations, while others are bred for larger egg or meat production, for flightlessness or other characteristics.

In December 2019 the results of a joint study by Chicago's Field Museum and the University of Michigan into changes in the morphology of birds were published in Ecology Letters. The study uses bodies of birds which died as a result of colliding with buildings in Chicago, Illinois, since 1978. The sample is made up of over 70,000 specimens from 52 species and spans the period from 1978 to 2016. The study shows that the length of birds' lower leg bones (an indicator of body sizes) shortened by an average of 2.4% and their wings lengthened by 1.3%. The findings of the study suggest the morphological changes are the result of climate change, demonstrating an example of evolutionary change following Bergmann's rule.

== See also ==
- Dinosaur renaissance
- Aurornis
- Yi (dinosaur)
- Scansoriopterygidae
- Lack's principle
- Origin of avian flight
- Origin of birds
- Survival of the fittest
- Genomic evolution of birds
