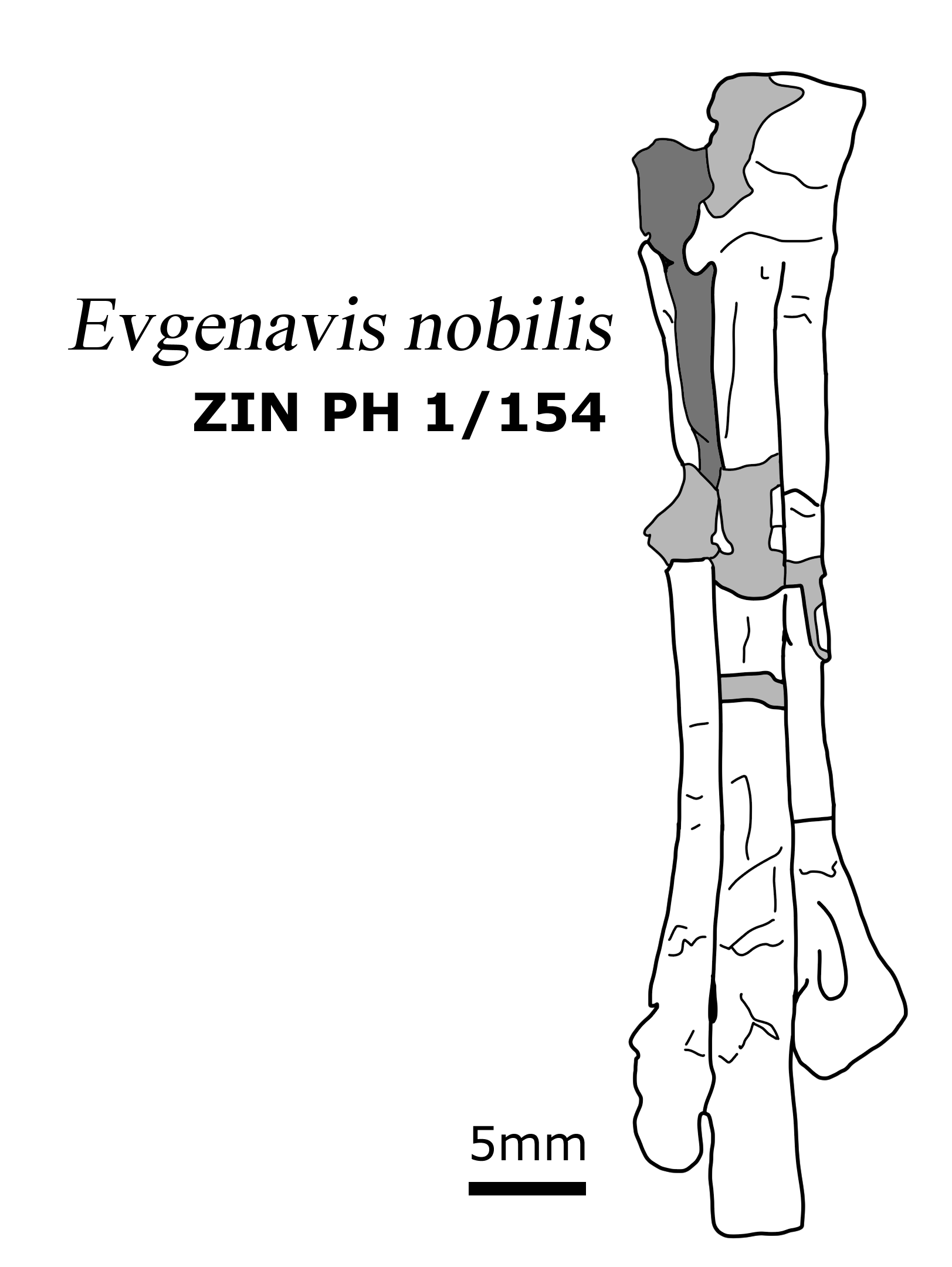
- Illustration of the type specimen of Evgenavis, a tarsometatarsus

Scientific classification
- Kingdom: Animalia
- Phylum: Chordata
- Class: Reptilia
- Clade: Dinosauria
- Clade: Saurischia
- Clade: Theropoda
- Clade: Avialae
- Clade: Avebrevicauda
- Clade: Pygostylia
- Genus: †Evgenavis; O'Connor et al., 2014

Type species
- †Evgenavis nobilis O'Connor et al., 2014

= Evgenavis =

Evgenavis Temporal range: Barremian–Aptian

Extinct genus of avialans

Evgenavis (named after the Russian paleontologist Evgeny Kurochkin) is a genus of pygostylian avialan that lived from the Barremian to the Aptian. The type specimen, ZIN PH 1/154, is an isolated tarsometatarsus found in the Ilek Formation (Shestakovo locality), Western Siberia. Evgenavis is anatomically similar to members of the Confuciusornithiformes, which would make it the only member of this clade known outside the Jehol Biota. However, a phylogenetic analysis instead resolved it as a member of the Enantiornithes. A cladogram within a 2019 study involving a wide range of theropods included Evgenavis as the sister taxon to Longirostravis, generally regarded as a member of the family Longipterygidae.
