= Cuban kestrel =

Cuban kestrel Temporal range: Late Quaternary

Conservation status
- Extinct

Scientific classification
- Kingdom: Animalia
- Phylum: Chordata
- Class: Aves
- Order: Falconiformes
- Family: Falconidae
- Genus: Falco
- Species: †F. kurochkini

Binomial name
- †Falco kurochkini Suarez & Olson, 2001

Extinct species of bird

The Cuban kestrel (Falco kurochkini) was a species of small falcon in the family Falconidae that was formerly endemic to the island of Cuba. It was described from fossil remains from late Quaternary deposits from several sites throughout the island.

It was intermediate in size between two extant species of falcon known from Cuba, the American kestrel (F. sparverius) and the merlin (F. columbarius). The species' most distinctive trait is its very long legs, possibly the longest of any species in the genus Falco. With these traits, F. kurochkini was likely a terrestrial bird of open areas, chasing prey on foot not unlike a small caracara. Due to the lack of mammalian predators aside from small insectivores, it also likely nested on the ground or in crevices.

Fossil evidence indicates that F. kurochkini was sympatric with the endemic Cuban subspecies of American kestrel (F. sparverius sparverioides), which remains extant today. F. kurochkini likely went extinct due to its terrestrial habits, which made it vulnerable to fires set by Paleo-Indians as well as invasive species introduced by Europeans. It may have become extinct as late as the 17th century, following European colonization of the area.

The specific epithet kurochkini honours Evgeny Kurochkin, who discovered the type specimen.
