= Evgeny Kurochkin =

Russian paleornithologist

Yevgeny Nikolayevich Kurochkin
- Born: July 12, 1940; Moscow
- Died: December 13, 2011 (aged 71); Moscow
- Education: Doctor of Science (1994); Professor
- Alma mater: Moscow State University (1964)
- Scientific career
- Fields: Paleontology
- Workplaces: Paleontological Institute
- Thesis: The main stages of the evolution of the class of birds
- Doctoral advisor: Georgi Dementiev

Yevgeny Nikolayevich Kurochkin (Евгений Николаевич Курочкин; 12 July 1940 - 13 December 2011) was a Russian paleornithologist at the Paleontological Institute of the Russian Academy of Sciences. He served as President of the Menzbier Ornithological Society.

He graduated from the Moscow State University in 1964. Most of his field work was done in Central Asia, Mongolia, Cuba, and Vietnam. In 1982, Kurochkin described Ambiortus, which he thought to be the oldest ornithurine (modern-type bird). Kurochkin named the new species after his peer Georgi Petrovich Dementyev (1898-1969). In 2011, Kurochkin and Gareth J. Dyke described Eostrix tsaganica found in Mongolia, the first find of this primitive owl in Asia.

Opposing the theropod origin of modern birds, Kurochkin maintained that archosaurs and dinosaurs were two distinct lineages. He repeatedly questioned the assumption that Archaeopteryx and Enantiornithes were early birds. According to Kurochkin, those moderately derived theropods became extinct without leaving any descendants. He also supported the Protoavis hypothesis by Sankar Chatterjee.

The Aquila kurochkini Boev 2013, an extinct eagle from Bulgaria, is named after Yevgeny Kurochkin, as is the Longusunguis kurochkini Wang, Zhou, O’Connor et Zelenkov, 2014(first described in 2014). Other bird species named after Yevgeny Kurochkin are: Anas kurochkini Zelenkov et Panteleyev, 2014, Palaelodus kurochkini Zelenkov, 2013, Zheroia kurochkini Nessov, 1988, Falco kurochkini Suárez et Olson, 2001, Glaucidium kurochkini Campbell et Bocheński, 2012, Euronyctibius kurochkini Mourer-Chauviré, 1989 and Evgenavis nobilis O'Connor et al., 2014.
