= Boluochia =

Boluochia Temporal range: Early Cretaceous, 120 Ma

Scientific classification
- Kingdom: Animalia
- Phylum: Chordata
- Class: Reptilia
- Clade: Dinosauria
- Clade: Saurischia
- Clade: Theropoda
- Clade: Avialae
- Clade: †Enantiornithes
- Family: †Longipterygidae
- Genus: †Boluochia; Zhou, 1995
- Species: †B. zhengi

Binomial name
- †Boluochia zhengi Zhou, 1995

Extinct genus of birds

Boluochia is an extinct genus of enantiornithean bird. It lived during the Early Cretaceous in the time span 121.6-110.6 mya (late Aptian-early Albian) and is known from fossils found in the Jiufotang Formation of Liaoning province, People's Republic of China. Boluochia was first described by Zhou in 1995. A re-analysis of the specimen by Jingmai O'Connor and colleagues found that it was closely related to Longipteryx and could be assigned to the family Longipterygidae.

While it was originally described as having a hooked, raptorial beak, the specimen is badly preserved, and further research suggested that it instead had a normal, toothed, and probably elongated snout like other longipterygids. Though the only known specimen is very poorly preserved, in nearly all features that can be compared between the two, Boluochia is indistinguishable from a juvenile specimen of Longipteryx. Jingmai O'Connor and colleagues, in a 2010 re-study of the specimen, could find only one concrete feature to distinguish them: in Boluochia, the fourth metatarsal diverges significantly from the others, causing the outer toe to be separated from the rest when perched. The researchers who noted this characteristic argued that it was not likely to be a deformity because it was present on both feet, and that it was not a juvenile characteristic, as it is not seen in known juvenile specimens of Longipteryx.
