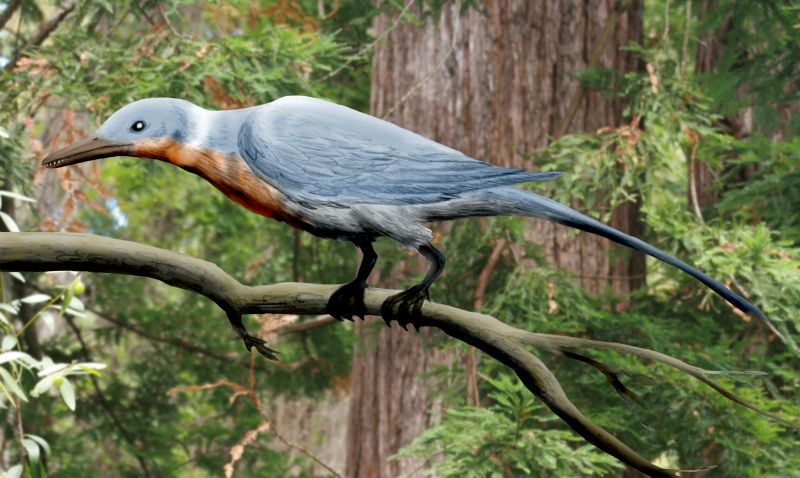
- Life restoration

Scientific classification
- Kingdom: Animalia
- Phylum: Chordata
- Class: Reptilia
- Clade: Dinosauria
- Clade: Saurischia
- Clade: Theropoda
- Clade: Avialae
- Clade: †Enantiornithes
- Family: †Longipterygidae
- Genus: †Shanweiniao; O'Connor et al., 2009
- Species: †S. cooperorum

Binomial name
- †Shanweiniao cooperorum O'Connor et al., 2009

= Shanweiniao =

Shanweiniao Temporal range: Early Cretaceous, 122 Ma

Extinct genus of birds

Shanweiniao is a genus of long-snouted enantiornithean birds from Early Cretaceous China. One species is known, Shanweiniao cooperorum. There is one known fossil, a slab and counterslab. The fossil is in the collection of the Dalian Natural History Museum, and has accession number DNHM D1878/1 and DNHM1878/2. It was collected from the Lower Cretaceous Dawangzhengzi Beds, middle Yixian Formation, from Lingyuan in the Liaoning Province, China.

O'Connor et al. (2010) found that Shanweiniao is a close relative of Longipteryx, Longirostravis, and Rapaxavis, which together form a clade of long-beaked enantiornithean birds, the Longipterygidae.

The genus name Shanweiniao (simplified Chinese: 扇尾鸟; traditional Chinese: 扇尾鳥) means "fan-tailed bird" in Chinese. The authors report that Shanweiniao is the only known enantiornithean bird with a tail surface capable of generating lift, as in modern birds. They also report that only one other Mesozoic bird, Yixianornis grabaui, which is a basal ornithuran, has been reported with this fan-shaped tail feather morphology.

In a subsequent publication O'Connor et al. (2016) stated that interpretations of the tail morphology of this species are speculative due to incomplete preservation of the feathers of the holotype specimen. The authors noted that longipterygid enantiornithines like Shanweiniao had very robust pygostyles even by enantiornithine standards, while birds preserving clear evidence for aerodynamic rectricial arrangements (Sapeornis, Chiappeavis, members of Ornithuromorpha) had relatively more delicate pygostyles. O'Connor et al. (2016) also reported presence of narrow spaces visible between some of the tail feathers of the holotype specimen of Shanweiniao cooperorum. The authors considered it more likely that Shanweiniao had rachis-dominated tail feathers similar to feathers present in Paraprotopteryx.

The specific name, cooperorum, is after Carl and Lynn Cooper who donated funds to support the study of Mesozoic birds in China.

Though originally interpreted as an arboreal bird, it appears to have been terrestrial in habits, ranking with taxa like megapodes and larks.
