= Uncinate processes of ribs =

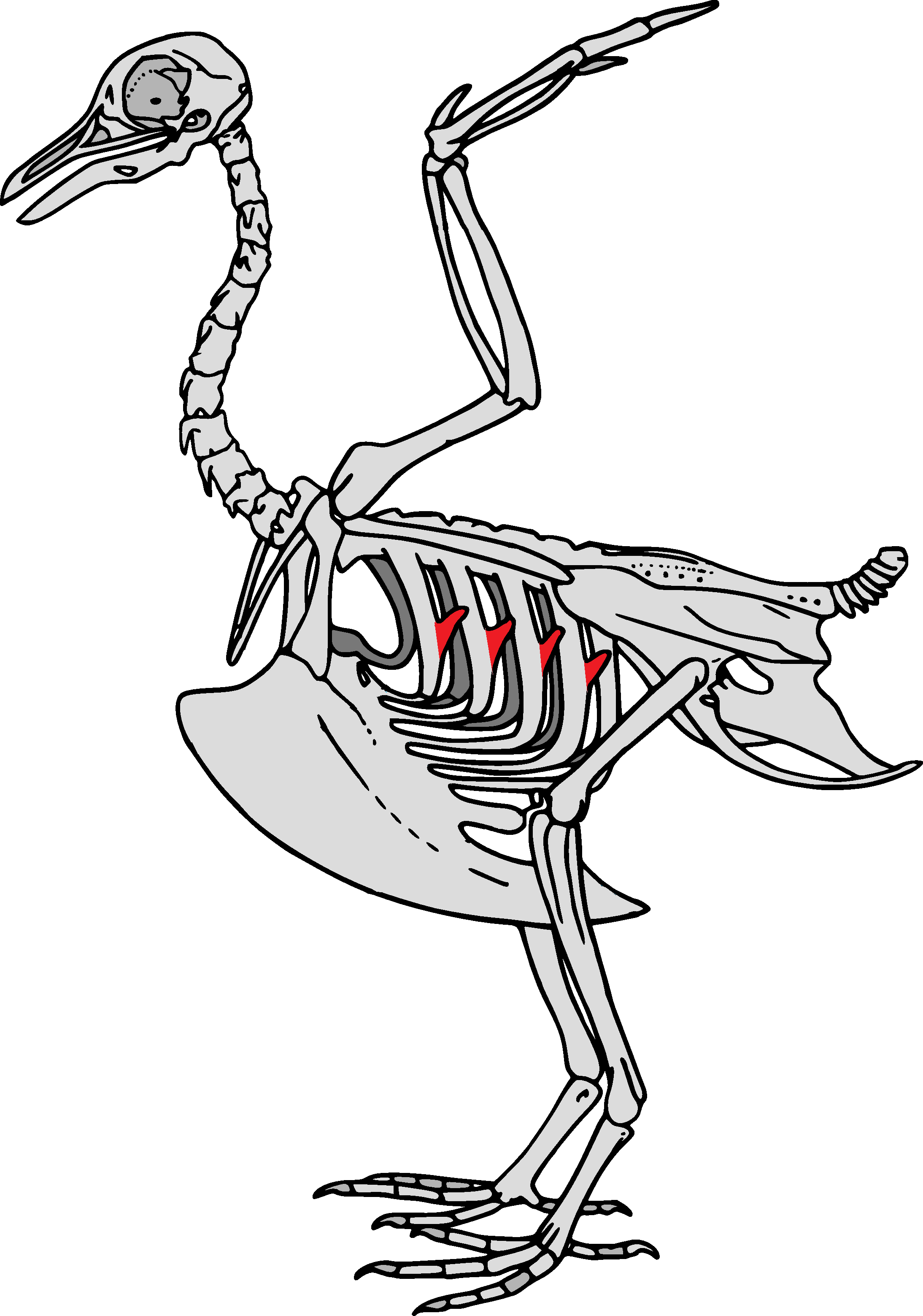
This stylised bird skeleton highlights the uncinate processes

The uncinate processes of the ribs are extensions of bone that project caudally from the vertical segment of each rib. (Uncinate means hooked from Latin uncinatus, from uncinus, barb, from uncus, hook.) They are found in birds (except for screamers), reptiles, and the early amphibian Ichthyostega.

These processes can serve to attach scapula muscles, and help to strengthen the rib cage overlapping with the rib behind them. They are also shown to have a role in respiration by increasing the effectiveness of muscles involved in inspiration including the appendicocostal muscles. The processes are short in walking birds and long in diving species and are of intermediate length in non-specialist birds. The screamers (Anhimidae) are unique in lacking this process. The process has also been noted in some enantiornitheans. Although among living vertebrates, bony uncinate processes are unique to birds, cartilaginous uncinate processes are present in crocodiles. The uncinate process has also been reported in Sphenodon and fossil vertebrates including Caudipteryx, oviraptorids, dromaeosaurids, Confuciusornis, Chaoyangia, and Longipteryx; however it apparently does not occur in Archaeopteryx, though Codd et al. (2007) reported uncinate processes in Archaeopteryx.
