= Orienantius =

Orienantius Temporal range: Early Cretaceous, 130.7 Ma
- Paratype specimen (BMNHC Ph 1154a), National Natural History Museum of China

Scientific classification
- Kingdom: Animalia
- Phylum: Chordata
- Class: Reptilia
- Clade: Dinosauria
- Clade: Saurischia
- Clade: Theropoda
- Clade: Avialae
- Clade: †Enantiornithes
- Genus: †Orienantius; Liu et al., 2019
- Species: †O. ritteri

Binomial name
- †Orienantius ritteri Liu et al., 2019

Extinct genus of birds

Orienantius ritteri is an extinct genus of enantiornithean bird from the Lower Cretaceous of China.

== Description ==
Orienantius is known from the holotype specimen BMNHC Ph 1156a/b and the referred specimen BMNHC Ph 1154a/b. Both specimens of Orienantius come from the Huajiying Formation of Hebei Province. BMNHC Ph 1156a/b consists of a nearly complete, articulated skeleton with extensive feather impressions on a slab and counterslab. BMNHC Ph 1154a/b is also known from a nearly complete, articulated skeleton with body, wing, and tail feathers preserved in a slab and counterslab. Both individuals were estimated by the authors to be about the same size as the Eurasian Skylark. The lack of fusion in the carpometacarpus, tibiotarsus, tarsometatarsus, and other compound bones lead the authors to suggest that the holotype of Orienantius was not skeletally mature at the time of death. Fossils of Orienantius preserves extensive non-plumage soft tissues of the neck, hindlimbs, forelimbs, and visceral region, an exceptional state of preservation for fossil birds. The soft tissues of Orienantius allowed researchers to better estimate the flight capabilities of basal Enantiornithes; Orienantius showed evidence that it was capable of high manoeuvrability and intermittent flap-gliding.

== Etymology ==
The name Orienantius is composed of the prefix "Oriens-", meaning "east", "dawn", and the suffix "-enantius", meaning "opposite" and used here after its clade, the Enantiornithes. The specific name, ritteri, honours the German scientist Johann Wilhelm Ritter.
