= Fortunguavis =

Fortunguavis Temporal range: Aptian

Scientific classification
- Kingdom: Animalia
- Phylum: Chordata
- Class: Reptilia
- Clade: Dinosauria
- Clade: Saurischia
- Clade: Theropoda
- Clade: Avialae
- Clade: †Enantiornithes
- Genus: †Fortunguavis
- Species: †F. xiaotaizicus

Binomial name
- †Fortunguavis xiaotaizicus Wang et al., 2014

Extinct genus of enantiornithean theropod

Fortunguavis is an extinct monotypic genus of enantiornithean theropod that lived during the Aptian stage of the Early Cretaceous epoch.

== Palaeobiology ==
=== Locomotion ===
The extreme curvature of the pedal unguals of Fortunguavis xiaotaizicus suggests that it was highly specialised for scansorial locomotion.
