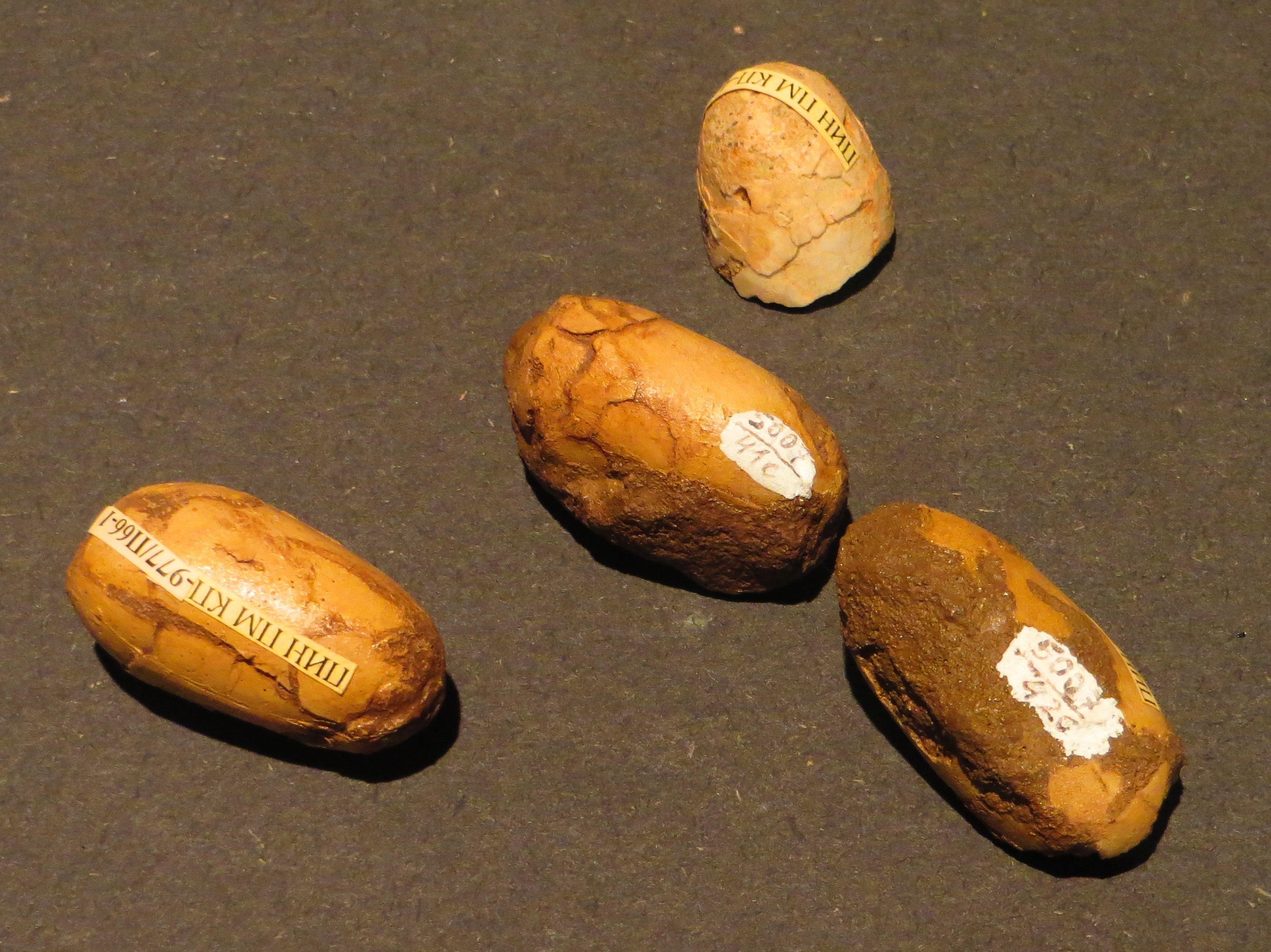
- Eggs of Gobipteryx minuta

Scientific classification
- Kingdom: Animalia
- Phylum: Chordata
- Class: Reptilia
- Clade: Dinosauria
- Clade: Saurischia
- Clade: Theropoda
- Clade: Avialae
- Clade: †Enantiornithes
- Family: †Gobipterygidae
- Genus: †Gobipteryx; Elżanowski, 1974
- Species: †G. minuta

Binomial name
- †Gobipteryx minuta Elżanowski, 1974

Synonyms
- Nanantius valifanovi Kurochkin, 1996

= Gobipteryx =

Gobipteryx Temporal range: Late Cretaceous, 75–71 Ma

Extinct genus of birds

Gobipteryx (from "Gobi" [referring to the Gobi Desert where it was first discovered], and Greek pteryx "wing") is a genus of prehistoric bird from the Campanian Age of the Late Cretaceous Period. It is not known to have any direct descendants. Like the rest of the enantiornithes clade, Gobipteryx is thought to have gone extinct near the end of the Cretaceous.

== Description ==
Based on a skull length of 45 millimeters, Gobipteryx has been estimated to be approximately the size of a partridge. Its bones are fibrolamellar.

The skull's general shape is gradually tapering toward the front. Gobipteryx has a toothless beak formed from the fusion of the premaxillae bones. The skull is characterized as being rhynchokinetic with the pterygoid bones articulating with both the vomers and the palatine. The nares are tear shaped and the choana is located below them, more rosteral than in most modern birds. The nares are smaller than the antorbital fenestrae, a basal feature for ornithurae birds. In addition, Gobipteryx's skull has an articulated rostrum. The jaw hinge is associated with the articulation of the quadrate with the pterygoid processes. The articular region of the mandible contains internal and retroarticular processes and has uniform symphysis. This animal has a large, uniform, and sutureless braincase.

The vertebral column consists of at least 19 presacral vertebrae, the last six of these being dorsals. The neural spines of the twelfth and thirteenth vertebrae form the nuchal blade, which represents the point of greatest elevation in the vertebral column.

The scapula contains a prominent glenoid labrum and tapers backward, ending as thin rods. The coracoids are slightly concave anteriorly and are separate from the scapulae dorsally. They also stick out from the neck on either side. Gobipteryx's clavicles curve in a way that is consistent with that of other birds.

The humerus is posteriorly convex (a normal trait for birds) and the head is comma-shaped. Gobipteryx's ulna is about twice as thick as the radius. Metacarpals II and III have been found in embryonic fossils and are observed to be about equal size and are in close contact with each other.

== Paleobiology ==
=== Flight ===
Gobipteryx is believed to have been capable of flight. The scapula is long, and therefore, well suited for flight by having more area for muscle attachment. In addition, the forelimb of Gobipteryx is more than twice the length of the thorax, falling within the acceptable range observed in flying birds.

=== Development ===
Gobipteryx, along with other enantiornithes, is thought to have superprecocial development, in which it was capable of flying upon hatching. Evidence for this comes from the fact that the forelimbs and shoulders of advanced embryos are almost completely ossified. In addition, the growth of G. minuta has been shown to slow down immediately following hatching. This suggests that it was highly mobile in its life, since locomotion has been shown to slow the growth of young birds by focusing energy and resources elsewhere. This onset of flight so early in life is not seen in most modern birds, which begin flying when they have reached or are close to full size.

== History ==
The first specimens were two damaged skulls discovered as part of the 1971 Polish-Mongolian Paleontological Expedition to the Gobi Desert by Dr. Teresa Maryańska, however, at the time, it was not immediately recognized that both of these skulls belonged to Gobipteryx. It was first found in the sandstones of the Lower Nemegt Beds of the Barun Goyot Formation of the Nemegt Basin. The holotype specimen is housed at the Institute of Paleobiology of the Polish Academy of Sciences in Warsaw, Poland and was first described by Dr. Andrzej Elżanowski using a single damaged skull. Initially, Gobipteryx was classified as a member of the clade Palaeognathae on the basis of its jaw and palate. However, in 1981, Dr. Cyril Walker defined the clade enantiornithes and Gobipteryx was reclassified as an enantiornithes bird.

In 1996, Evgeny Kurochkin described a new bird known as Nanantius valifanovi also from the Barun Goyot Formation. However, it was later discovered that N. valifanoi was actually a new misidentified specimen of Gobipteryx minuta. The mistake was, at least in part, due to a misidentification of the maxilla and dentary bones of the skull.

In 1994, an expedition to the Gobi Desert was conducted by the American Museum of Natural History and the Mongolian Academy of Sciences, where a well preserved Gobiptetyx minuta skull was found in the Nemegt Basin. This new specimen provided further evidence for the placement of Gobipteryx into enantiornithes. In addition, it allowed for the reconstruction of the palate, which was poorly understood in Mesozoic birds.

Also during the 1971 Polish-Mongolian Paleontological Expedition to the Gobi Desert, in which the first specimens were found, advanced embryos of Gobipteryx minuta were found. Seven specimens in total were found, including two skeletons in the redbeds of Khermeen Tsav in Mongolia's Gobi Desert. These embryos made up the second confirmed embryonic fossils from before the Quaternary Period as well as the first confirmed postcranial fossils of G. minuta found.

== See also ==
- Archaeopteryx
- Evolution of Birds
