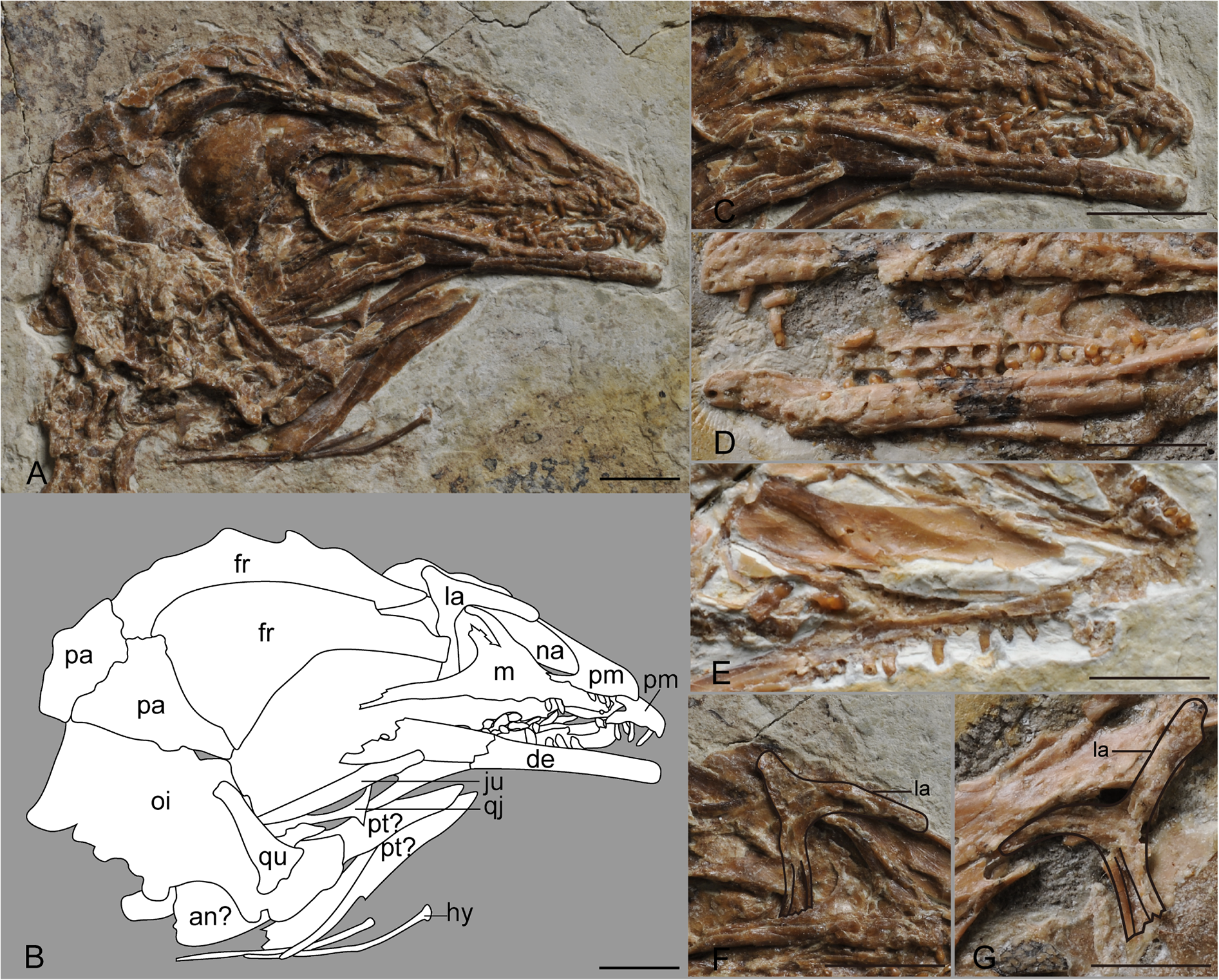
- Parapengornis skull

Scientific classification
- Kingdom: Animalia
- Phylum: Chordata
- Class: Reptilia
- Clade: Dinosauria
- Clade: Saurischia
- Clade: Theropoda
- Clade: Avialae
- Clade: †Enantiornithes
- Family: †Pengornithidae
- Genus: †Eopengornis
- Species: †E. martini

Binomial name
- †Eopengornis martini Wang et al., 2014

= Eopengornis =

Eopengornis Temporal range: Hauterivian

Extinct genus of birds

Eopengornis is an extinct genus of pengornithid that lived in China during the Hauterivian. It contains the species E. martini.
