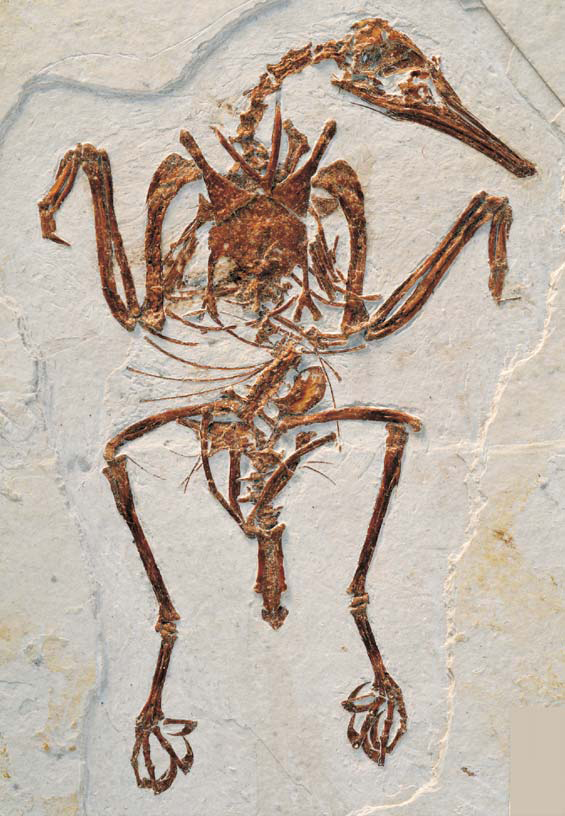
- Holotype

Scientific classification
- Domain: Eukaryota
- Kingdom: Animalia
- Phylum: Chordata
- Clade: Dinosauria
- Clade: Saurischia
- Clade: Theropoda
- Clade: Avialae
- Clade: †Enantiornithes
- Family: †Longipterygidae
- Genus: †Rapaxavis; Morschhauser et al., 2009
- Species: †R. pani

Binomial name
- †Rapaxavis pani Morschhauser et al., 2009

= Rapaxavis =

Rapaxavis Temporal range: Early Cretaceous, 113 Ma

Extinct genus of birds

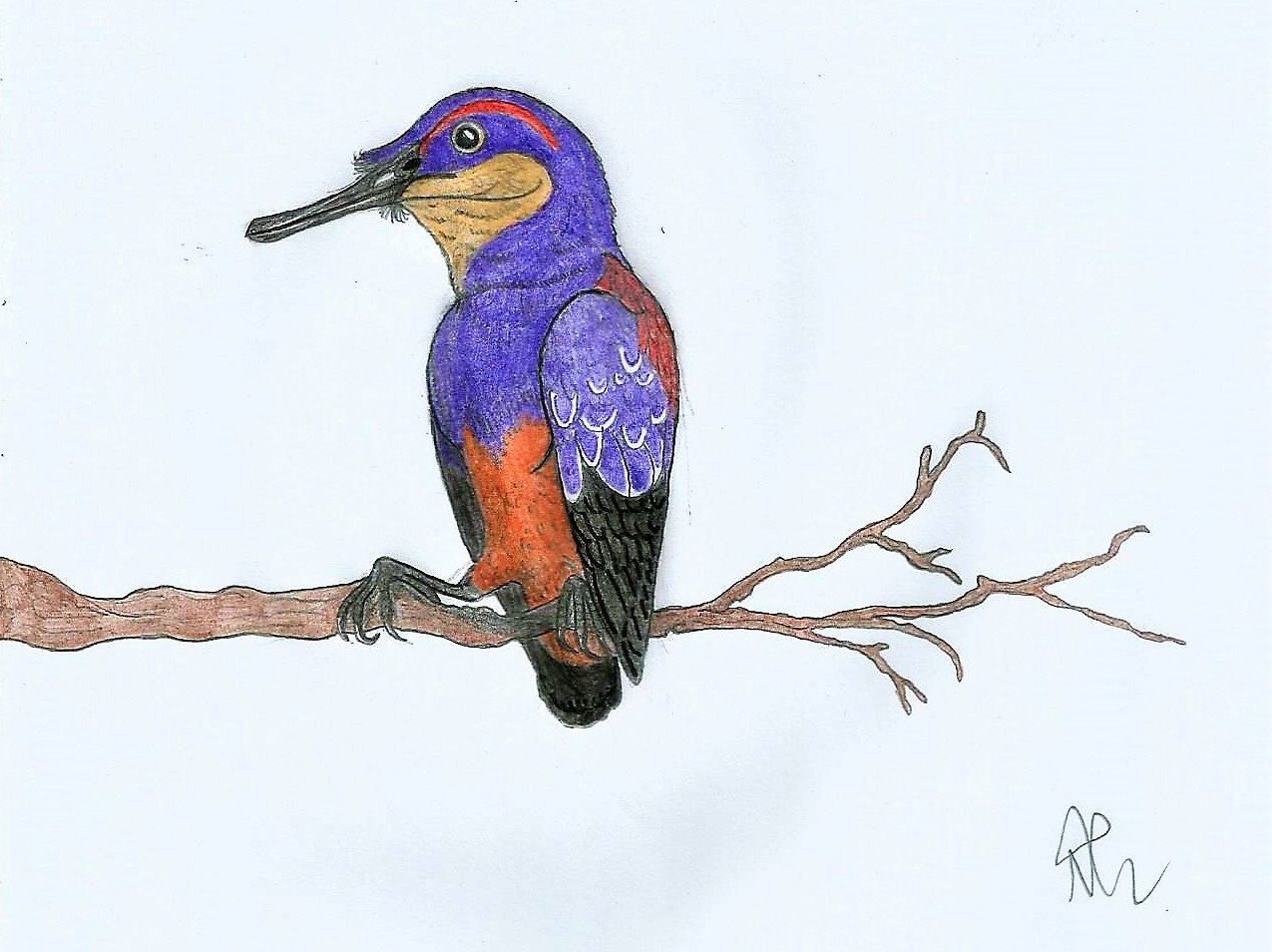
Speculative life restoration of Rapaxavis pani

Rapaxavis a genus of enantiornithean bird. It has been found in the Jiufotang Formation in Liaoning, People's Republic of China.

In 2006 a specimen was reported, discovered by Pan Lijun at Xiaioyugou near the town of Lianhe, and referred to Longirostravis.

In 2009 this specimen was named and described as the type species Rapaxavis pani by Eric M. Morschhauser, David Varricchio, Gao Chunling, Liu Jinyuan, Wang Xuri, Cheng Xiadong and Meng Qingjin. The generic name combines the Latin rapax, "grasping", with avis, "bird", in reference to the special grasping function of the foot. The specific name honours Pan as discoverer. It is also an allusion to Pan, the god of the forests, because the species was assumed to have been arboreal.

The holotype, DMNH D2522, was found in a layer of the Jiufotang Formation dating from the early Albian. It consists of a nearly complete skeleton with skull, on a slab. When the slab was split from its counterplate, the bones did not split with them, preserving them perfectly. The specimen was in 2009 described after having been observed without any preparation. It represents a subadult individual. Later it was prepared but in an unprofessional way, damaging the skeleton, especially the skull where the entire right jugal bone was removed. Subsequently, it was sent to the Natural History Museum of Los Angeles County where a further preparation took place, which managed to repair some of the damage. The knowledge gained during this process was the basis for a more detailed redescription in 2011.
