= Elsornis =

Elsornis Temporal range: Late Cretaceous, 80 Ma

Scientific classification
- Kingdom: Animalia
- Phylum: Chordata
- Class: Reptilia
- Clade: Dinosauria
- Clade: Saurischia
- Clade: Theropoda
- Clade: Avialae
- Clade: †Enantiornithes
- Genus: †Elsornis; Chiappe et al., 2007
- Species: †E. keni

Binomial name
- †Elsornis keni Chiappe et al., 2007

Extinct genus of birds

Elsornis is a genus of enantiornithean bird. Only one species has been named, Elsornis keni. It lived during the Late Cretaceous. It is known from a partially articulated fossil skeleton found in the Gobi Desert in Mongolia.

The holotype fossil has been given the catalogue number MPD - b 100/201. It is in the collection of the Mongolian Palaeontological Center. The fossil was collected at Togrogiin Shiree, South Gobi Aimak, Mongolia; Djadokhta Formation, Late Cretaceous, Campanian.

The fossil is extremely well preserved in three dimensions. It preserves a pneumatized Furcula, which was a character previously unknown in enantiornitheans. Chiappe et al. (2007) conclude from the proportions of Elsornis ' pectoral skeleton that it was flightless or nearly so. It may have glided like Archaeopteryx, climbing in trees to pounce on its prey on the ground. However, if this is not the case, it may have hunted on the ground, snatching up small vertebrates and bugs. Like the other members of Avisauridae, it probably had small non-serrated teeth it used for hunting, and possibly scavenged the carcasses left by other, more formidable carnivores.

A study by Atterholt et al. in 2018 places Elsornis in the family Avisauridae.

== Etymology ==
The genus name Elsornis is derived from the Mongolian word "els", meaning "sand", and "ornis", the Greek word for "bird". The specific name "keni" honors Mr. Ken Hayashibara.
