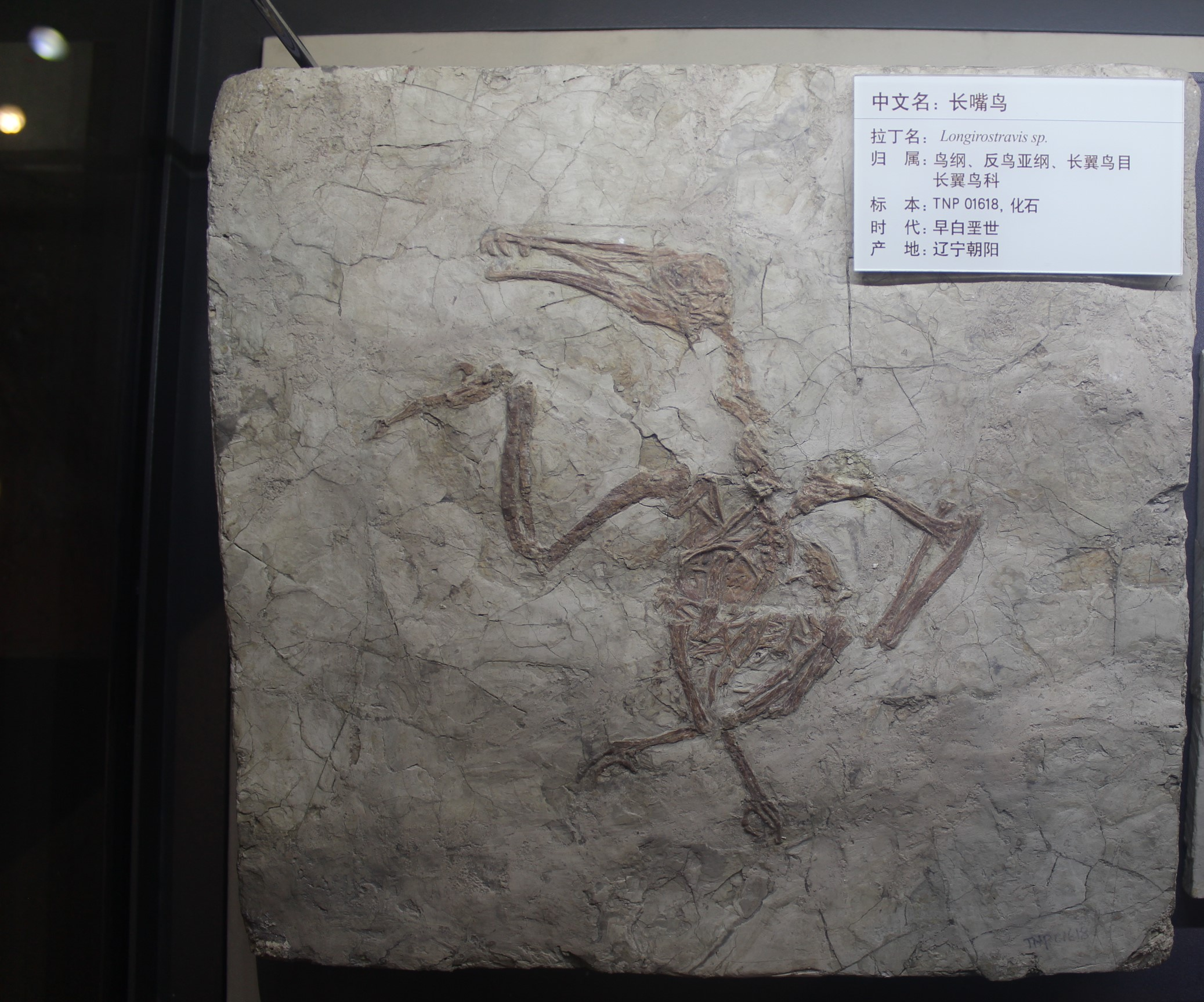
- Fossil specimen, Tianjin Natural History Museum

Scientific classification
- Kingdom: Animalia
- Phylum: Chordata
- Class: Reptilia
- Clade: Dinosauria
- Clade: Saurischia
- Clade: Theropoda
- Clade: Avialae
- Clade: †Enantiornithes
- Family: †Longipterygidae
- Genus: †Longirostravis; Hou et al., 2004
- Species: †L. hani

Binomial name
- †Longirostravis hani Hou et al., 2004

= Longirostravis =

Longirostravis Temporal range: Early Cretaceous, 125 Ma

Extinct genus of birds

Longirostravis is a genus of enantiornithean birds which existed during the early Cretaceous period (around 125 million years ago) and is known from fossils found in the middle or upper Yixian Formation in Yixian County, People's Republic of China. It is known from a single specimen housed in the collections of the Institute of Vertebrate Paleontology and Paleoanthropology (specimen number IVPP V 11309) representing the type species Longirostravis hani.

Based on this specimen, L. hani appears to have been a "quail-sized" bird with a long, tapering and slightly curved snout tipped with five pairs of small, conical teeth. The long, narrow snout may have been used for mud probing, an ecology similar to modern oystercatchers. L. hani had an unusually-shaped breast bone (sternum) with a pair of three-pronged projections shaped somewhat like moose horns on either side. Feathers were preserved around the entire body but seem to have been absent on the feet and snout. The wing feathers were strongly asymmetrical, with the leading edge of the feather five times narrower than the trailing edge. The primary wing feathers were up to 8 centimetres (3.1 in) in length. As in some other enantiornitheans, the tail sported a single pair of long feathers.
