= 1992 in paleontology =

Paleontology or palaeontology is the study of prehistoric life forms on Earth through the examination of plant and animal fossils. This includes the study of body fossils, tracks (ichnites), burrows, cast-off parts, fossilised feces (coprolites), palynomorphs and chemical residues. Because humans have encountered fossils for millennia, paleontology has a long history both before and after becoming formalized as a science. This article records significant discoveries and events related to paleontology that occurred or were published in the year 1992.

== Plants ==
=== Cycads ===
Name	Novelty	Status	Authors	Age	Type locality	Location	Notes	Images
Eostangeria ruzinciniana	Sp nov	valid	Palamarev, Petkova, & Uzunova	Miocene	Krivodol Formation	Bulgaria	An eostangerioid zamiaceous cycad.	

=== Conifers ===
Name	Novelty	Status	Authors	Age	Unit	Location	Notes	Images
Pseudolarix arnoldii	Sp nov.	jr synonym	Gooch	Ypresian	Allenby Formation	Canada; British Columbia	A golden larch species, first described as Pseudolarix americana in part, combined into Pseudolarix amabilis in 1995	
Pseudolarix wehrii	Sp nov	valid	Gooch	Eocene	Klondike Mountain Formation	USA; Washington	A golden larch, first described as Pseudolarix americana in part, also found as mummified fossils from the Buchanan Lake Formation	Pseudolarix wehrii

=== Angiosperms ===
Name	Novelty	Status	Authors	Age	Type locality	Location	Notes	Images
Ethela	Gen et sp nov	valid	Erwin & Stockey	Eocene; Ypresian	Okanagan Highlands; Princeton Chert	Canada; British Columbia	A cyperaceous or juncaceous poalean monocot The type species is E. sargentiana	
Florissantia ashwillii	Sp nov	valid	Manchester	Middle Eocene	Clarno Formation	United States; Oregon	A mallow relative	
Florissantia quilchenensis	comb nov	valid	(Mathewes & Brooke) Manchester	Eocene; Ypresian	Okanagan Highlands; Coldwater Beds	Canada; British Columbia	A mallow relative, moved from Holmskioldia quilchenensis (1971)	
Florissantia sikhote-alinensis	comb nov	valid	(Lesquereux) Manchester	Late Eocene	Florissant Formation	United States; Colorado	A mallow relative, moved from Holmskioldia speirii (1953)	
Palaeocarpinus joffrensis	Sp nov	Valid	Sun & Stockey	Paleocene; Tiffanian	Paskapoo Formation; Lacombe member	Canada; Alberta	A betulaceous fruit	

== Arthropods ==
=== Insects ===
Name	Novelty	Status	Authors	Age	Unit	Location	Notes	Images
Anonychomyrma constricta	Comb nov	jr synonym	(Mayr)	Lutetian	Baltic amber	Europe	A Dolichoderin ant, jr syn of Yantaromyrmex constricta	Yantaromyrmex constricta
Anonychomyrma samlandica	Comb nov	Jr synonym	(Wheeler)	Lutetian	Baltic amber	Europe	A Dolichoderin ant jr synonym of Yantaromyrmex samlandica	Yantaromyrmex samlandica
Cretomerobius	Gen et sp nov.	valid	Ponomarenko	Aptian	Bon-Tsagan	Mongolia	A hemerobiid lacewing, type species, C. disjunctus	
Liometopum goepperti	Comb nov	Jr synonym	(Mayr, 1868)	Middle Eocene	Baltic amber	Europe	Fossil Dolichoderine ant, moved to Ctenobethylus goepperti in 1997	Ctenobethylus goepperti
Miotingis	Gen et sp nov	valid	Nel	Messinian	Foufouilloux outcrop	France	A lacebug, type species M. cantalensis	Miotingis cantalensis
Neides oligocenicus	Sp nov	Valid	Nel	Chattian	Niveau du gypse d'Aix Formation	France	A thread bug	Neides oligocenicus
Panfilovia adamsi	Sp nov	jr synonym	Martins-Neto	Aptian	Crato Formation	Brazil	A Kalligrammatid lacewing, syn of Makarkinia adamsi	
Spatalistiforma	Gen. et sp. nov	Valid	Skalski	Lutetian	Baltic amber	Europe	A moth of uncertain placement. The type species is S. submerga.	Spatalistiforma submerga
Termitaradus protera	sp. nov	valid	Poinar & Doyen	Late Oligocene - Early Miocene	Mexican amber	Mexico	first fossil species of Termitaradus	

== Archosauromorphs ==
- During the 1992 field season a concerted effort was undertaken by the Royal Tyrell Museum to recover the remains of young hadrosaurs. The researchers describe the acquisition that season of 43 specimens as being a success. Most of the recovered fossils were of dentaries missing their teeth, bones from limbs and feet, as well as vertebral centra.
- Jack Horner speculated that transitional species evolved in the uppermost part of the Two Medicine Formation during the Bearpaw Transgression. This was during a half-million year span as the transgression inundated the Judith River Formation and, later, the Two Medicine area, gradually destroying the local dinosaurs' preferred habitats. Horner cited certain ceratopsid and pachycephalosaurid species as possible evidence for his hypothesis.

=== Newly named non-avian dinosaurs ===
Data courtesy of George Olshevsky's dinosaur genera list.

Name	Status	Authors	Age	Unit	Location	Notes	Images
Archaeornithoides	Valid taxon	Elzanowski Peter Wellnhofer	Campanian	Djadokhta Formation	Mongolia		Udanoceratops "Maleevosaurus"
Chinshakiangosaurus	Valid taxon	Ye vide Dong	Hettangian	Fengjiahe Formation	China		Udanoceratops "Maleevosaurus"
Dyslocosaurus	Valid taxon	McIntosh, Coombs & Dale A. Russell	Kimmeridgian	Morrison Formation	USA Wyoming	Exact provenance unknown, may actually be from the Lance Formation	Udanoceratops "Maleevosaurus"
Edmarka	Synonym of Torvosaurus	Robert Bakker, Kralis, Siegwarth and Filla	Kimmeridgian	Morrison Formation	USA Wyoming		Udanoceratops "Maleevosaurus"
Gigantspinosaurus	Valid taxon	Ouyang	Oxfordian	Upper Shaximiao Formation	China		Udanoceratops "Maleevosaurus"
Kunmingosaurus	Nomina nuda	Zhao X. (as Chao S.)	Hettangian	Fengjiahe Formation	China		Udanoceratops "Maleevosaurus"
Maleevosaurus	Junior synonym of Tarbosaurus	Kenneth Carpenter	Maastrichtian	Nemegt Formation	Mongolia		Udanoceratops "Maleevosaurus"
Neuquensaurus	Valid taxon	Jaime Eduardo Powell	Campanian	Anacleto Formation	Argentina		Udanoceratops "Maleevosaurus"
Udanoceratops	Valid taxon	Sergei Kurzanov	Campanian	Djadokhta Formation	Mongolia		Udanoceratops "Maleevosaurus"
Wakinosaurus	Nomen dubium	Okazaki	Valanginian-Barremian	Sengoku Formation	Japan		Udanoceratops "Maleevosaurus"

=== Newly named birds ===
Name	Status	Novelty	Authors	Age	Unit	Location	Notes	Images
Anneavis anneae	Valid	Gen. nov. et Sp. nov.	Peter W. Houde Storrs L. Olson	Early Eocene	Late Wasatchian, Green River Formation	USA: Wyoming	A Coliiformes, Sandcoleidae Houde et Olson, 1992, this is the type species of the new genus.	
Archaealectrornis sibleyi	Valid	Gen. nov. et Sp. nov.	Timothy M. Crowe Lester L. Short	Middle-Late Oligocene	Brule Formation	USA: Nebraska	Described in the Gallinuloididae Lucas, 1900, but transferred to the Cracidae.	
Archaeoganga pinguis	Valid	Gen. nov. et Sp. nov.	Cécile Mourer-Chauviré	Eocene or Oligocene	Phosphorites du Quercy, MP 16 or 28	France	A Pteroclidae.	
Balearica exigua	Valid	Sp. nov.	Alan Feduccia Michael R. Voorhies	Late Miocene	Ash Hollow Formatie	USA: Nebraska	A Gruidae.	
Bucephala cereti	Valid	Sp. nov.	Odile Boeuf Cécile Mourer-Chauviré	Late Pliocene	MN 17	France	An Anatidae.	
Cathayornis yandica	Valid	Gen. nov. et Sp. nov.	Zhou Zhonghe Fan Jin Jiang Yong Zhang	Early Cretaceous	Valanginian, Jiufotang Formation	China	An Enantiornithes Walker, 1981, Cathayornithiformes Zhou, Jin et Zhang, 1992, Cathayornithidae Zhou, Jin et Zhang, 1992, this is the type species of the new genus.	
Chascacocolius oscitans	Valid	Gen. nov. et Sp. nov.	Peter W. Houde Storrs L. Olson	Early Eocene	Early Wasatchian, Willwood Formation	USA: Wyoming	A Coliiformes, Chascacocoliidae Zelenkov et Dyke, 2008, this is the type species of the new genus.	
Ciconia stehlini	Valid	Sp. nov.	Dénes Jánossy	Late Pleistocene	MN 16	Hungary	A Ciconiidae.	
Columbina prattae	Valid	Sp. nov.	Jonathan J. Becker Pierce Brodkorb	Early Miocene	Fissure fillings in Early Eocene Cristal River Limestone	USA: Florida	A Columbidae, in 2008 David W. Steadman made it the type species of his new genus Arenicolumbina.	
Concornis lacustris	Valid	Gen. nov. et Sp. nov.	José L. Sanz Angela D. Buscalioni	Early Cretaceous	Neocomian	Spain: Castilla–La Mancha	An Enantiornithes Walker, 1981, Iberomesornithiformes Sanz et J. F. Bonaparte, 1992, Concornithidae Kurochkin, 1996, this is the type species of the new genus.	
Foro panarium	Valid	Gen. nov. et Sp. nov.	Storrs L. Olson	Late Early Eocene	Green River Formation	USA: Wyoming	An Opisthocomiformes, Foratidae Olson, 1992.	
Gallicolumba nui	Valid	Sp. nov.	David W. Steadman	Holocene	Ua Huka	French Polynesia	A Columbidae.	
Gastornis russelli	Valid	Sp. nov.	Larry D. Martin	Late Paleocene	MP 6	France	A Gastornithidae Fürbringer, 1888.	
Helonetta brodkorbi	Valid	Gen. nov. et Sp. nov.	Steven D. Emslie	Late Pliocene	Blancan, Tamiami Formation	USA: Florida	An Anatidae, this is the type species of the new genus.	
Iberomesornis romerali	Valid	Gen. nov. et Sp. nov.	José L. Sanz José F. Bonaparte	Early Cretaceous	Hauterivian-Early Barremian	Spain: Castilla–La Mancha	An Enantiornithes, Iberomesornithiformes Sanz et J. F. Bonaparte, 1992, Iberomesornithidae Sanz et J. F. Bonaparte, 1992.	
Kuszholia mengi	Valid	Gen. nov. et Sp. nov.	Lev A. Nessov	Early Cretaceous	Turonian-Coniacian, Bissekty Formation	Uzbekistan	An Enantiornithes Walker, 1981, this is the type species of the new genus.	
Macranhinga paranensis	Valid	Gen. nov. et Sp. nov.	Jorge I. Noriega	Late Miocene	Mesopotamiense, Ituzaingó Formation	Argentina	A big Anhingidae.	
Macropygia arevarevauupa	Valid	Sp. nov.	David W. Steadman	Holocene	Huahine, Society Islands	French Polynesia	A Columbidae.	
Macropygia heana	Valid	Sp. nov.	David W. Steadman	Holocene	Ua Huka	French Polynesia	A Columbidae.	
Megalodytes morejohni	Valid	Gen. nov. et Sp. nov.	Hildegarde Howard	Middle Miocene	Sharktooth Hill Bonebed	USA: California	An Anatidae.	
Messelornis nearctica	Valid	Sp. nov.	Angelika Hesse	Early Eocene	Green River Formation	USA: Wyoming	A Ralliformes, Messelornithidae Hesse, 1988.	
Oxyura hulberti	Valid	Sp. nov.	Steven D. Emslie	Late Pliocene	Blancan, Tamiami Formation	USA: Florida	An Anatidae.	
Palaeoglaux artophoron	Valid	Sp. nov.	Dieter S. Peters	Middle Eocene	MP 11	Germany: Hessen	A Strigiformes, Palaeoglaucidae Mourer-Chauviré, 1987.	
Patagopteryx deferrariisi	Valid	Gen. nov. et Sp. nov.	Herculano M. F. de Alvarenga José F. Bonaparte	Late Cretaceous	Coniacian, Rio Colorado Formation	Argentina	An Ornithuromorphae Chiappe, Ji, Ji et Norell, 1999, Patagopterygiformes Alvarenga et J. F. Bonaparte, 1992, Patagopterygidae Alvarenga et J. F. Bonaparte, 1992, this is the type species of the new genus.	
Platanavis nana	Valid	Gen. nov. et Sp. nov.	Lev A. Nessov	Late Cretaceous	Coniacian	Uzbekistan	An Ornithuromorphae Chiappe, Ji, Ji et Norell, 1999, this is the type species of the new genus.	
Quercymegapodius brodkorbi	Valid	Sp. nov.	Cécile Mourer-Chauviré	Late Eocene	Phosphorites du Quercy	France	A Craciformes Sibley, Ahlquist et Monroe, 1988, Quercymegapodiidae Mourer-Chauviré, 1992.	
Quercypsitta ivani	Valid	Sp. nov.	Cécile Mourer-Chauviré	Late Eocene	MP 17	France	A Psittaciformes, Quercypsittidae Mourer-Chauviré, 1992.	
Quercypsitta sudrei	Valid	Gen. nov. et Sp. nov.	Cécile Mourer-Chauviré	Late Eocene	MP 17	France	A Psittaciformes, Quercypsittidae Mourer-Chauviré, 1992, this is the type species of the new genus.	
Sandcoleus copiosus	Valid	Gen. nov. et Sp. nov.	Peter W. Houde Storrs L. Olson	Early Eocene	Middle Clarkforkian, Willwood Formation	USA: Wyoming	A Coliiformes, Sandcoleidae Houde et Olson, 1992, this is the type species of the new genus.	
Sinornis santensis	Valid	Gen. nov. et Sp. nov.	Paul C. Sereno Rao Chenggang	Early Cretaceous	Valanginian	China	An Enantiornithes Walker, 1981, Cathayornithiformes Zhou, Jin et Zhang, 2006, Cathayornithidae Zhou, Jin et Zhang, 2006, this is the type species of the new genus.	
Tetrastes dalianensis	Valid	Sp. nov.	Hou Lian-Hai	Late Pliocene	Dalian	China	A Phasianidae, transferred to the genus Bonasa Stephen, 1819.	
Zhyraornis logunovi	Valid	Gen. nov. et Sp. nov.	Lev A. Nessov	Early Cretaceous	Turonian-Coniacian, Bissekty Formation	Uzbekistan	An Enantiornithes Walker, 1981.	

== Lepidosauromorphs ==
Name	Status	Authors	Age	Unit	Location	Notes	Images
Indophis sahnii	Valid	Rage & Prasad	Maastrichtian	Intertrappean Beds	India	A snake	

== Synapsids ==
=== Newly named mammals ===
Name	Novelty	Status	Authors	Age	Unit	Location	Notes	Images
Eurodon	Gen et sp nov	Valid	Estravís & Russell	Early Eocene	Silveirinha Formation	Portugal	Originally described as a taeniodont, type species is E. silveirinhensis	
Gobiopithecus	Gen et sp nov	Valid	Dashzeveg & Russell	Late Eocene	Ergilin Dzo Formation	Mongolia	A pantolestid, type species is G. khan	
Paschatherium marianae	Sp nov	Valid	Estravís & Russell	Early Eocene	Silveirinha Formation	Portugal	A hyopsodontid	

== Other Animals ==
Name	Status	Authors	Age	Unit	Location	Notes	Images
Dickinsonia rex	Synonym of Dickinsonia tenuis	Jenkins	Ediacaran		Australia		
