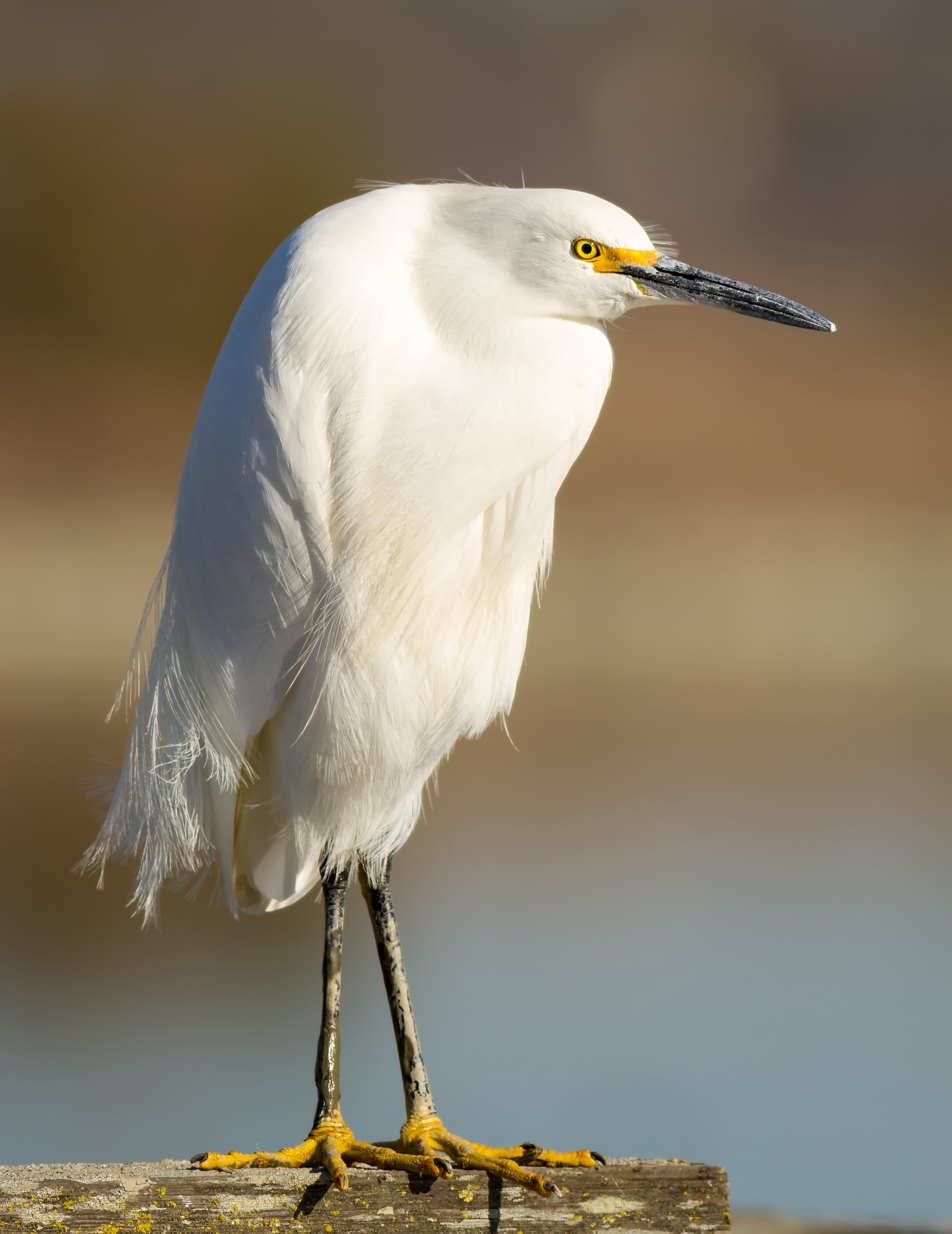
- Snowy egret (Egretta thula)

Scientific classification
- Kingdom: Animalia
- Phylum: Chordata
- Class: Aves
- Clade: Neoaves
- Clade: Aquaterraves; Wu et al., 2024

Clades
- Aequorlitornithes; Mirandornithes; Opisthocomiformes; Phaethoquornithes; Litusilvanae; Columbaves

= Aquaterraves =

Aquaterraves Temporal range: Late Cretaceous (Campanian) – Recent 81–0 Ma

Taxon of neoavian birds

Aquaterraves is a taxon of birds, located at the base of the neoavian radiation as sister to Telluraves. The 2024 study that recovered the taxon found it to include two strongly supported branches, Aequorlitornithes (including core waterbirds Aequornithes and their relatives) and the newly established Litusilvanae (uniting Charadriiformes, Gruiformes, and Caprimulgimorphae), as well a third branch containing Columbiformes and related taxa that have had an unstable position in previous phylogenomic studies.

== Paleohistory ==
The divergence of Aquaterraves from Telluraves was estimated to have occurred around 87 Mya (million years ago), while the split of Aquaterraves itself was estimated at 81 Mya.

== Phylogeny ==
- Neoaves
  - Aquaterraves
    - - Columbaves
        - Columbimorphae (pigeons, sandgrouse, mesites)
        - Otidimorphae (bustards, turacos, cuckoos)
    - - Litusilvanae
        - Strisores (hummingbirds, swifts, nightbirds)
        - Gruimorphae (Cursorimorphae)
          - Gruiformes (cranes, rails)
          - Charadriiformes (shorebirds)
      - Aequorlitornithes
        - Mirandornithes (flamingos, grebes)
        - - Opisthocomiformes (hoatzin)
          - Phaethoquornithes
            - Phaethontimorphae (sunbittern, kagu, tropicbirds)
            - Aequornithes (core waterbirds)
  - Telluraves (core landbirds)
