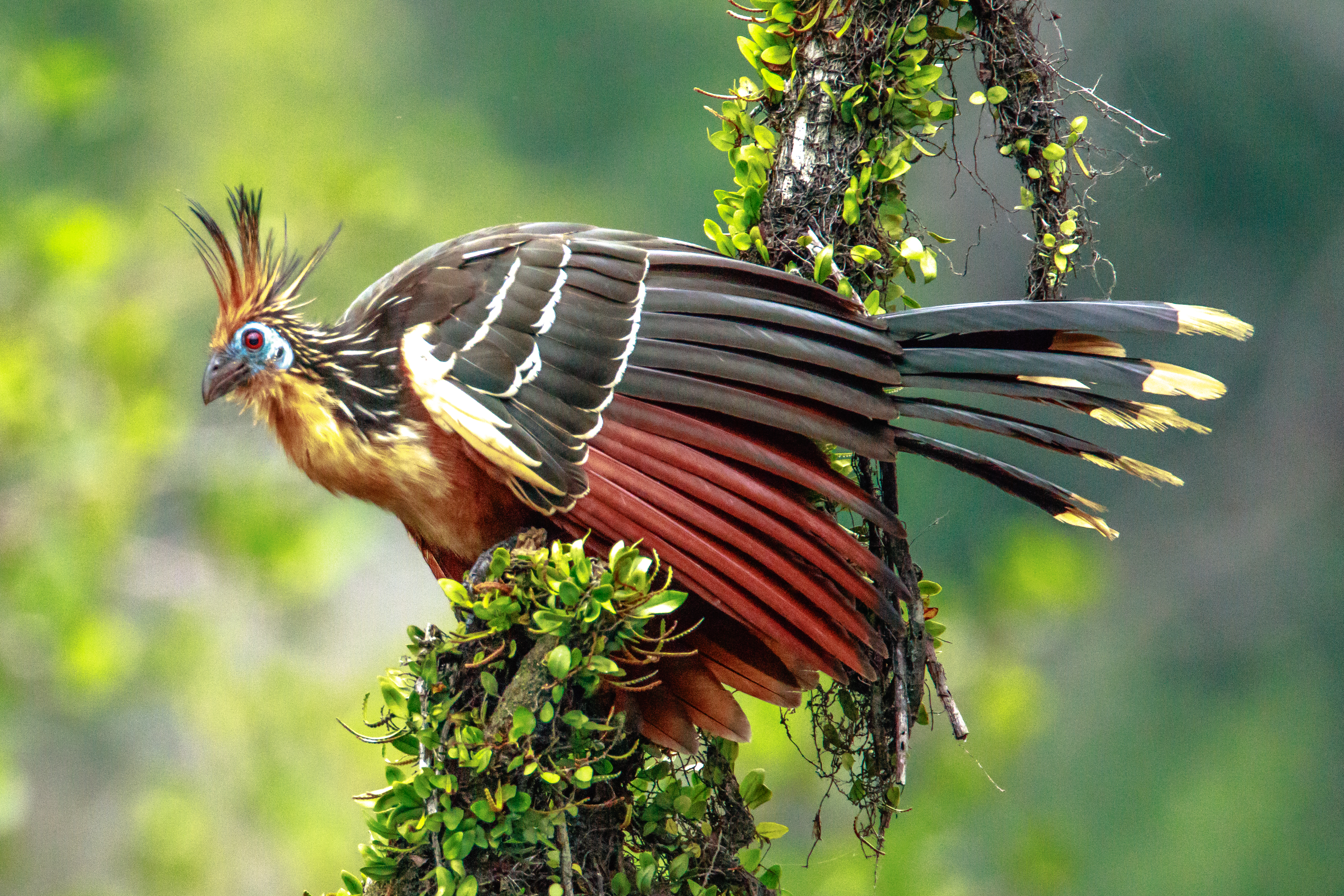
- Hoatzin (Opisthocomus hoazin)

Scientific classification
- Kingdom: Animalia
- Phylum: Chordata
- Class: Aves
- Clade: Neoaves
- Clade: Inopinaves; Prum et al., 2015

Clades
- Opisthocomiformes; Telluraves

= Inopinaves =

Inopinaves Temporal range: Paleocene - Holocene, 62.5–0 Ma

Taxon of birds

Inopinaves is a taxon of neoavian birds recovered in a compressive genomic systematic study using nearly 200 species in 2015. It contains the clades Opisthocomiformes (hoatzin) and Telluraves (core landbirds); the study shows that the hoatzin diverged from other birds 64 million years ago. Previous studies have placed the hoatzin in different parts of the bird family tree; however, despite its unusual morphology, genetic studies have shown the hoatzin is not as primitive or as ancient as once thought; it could be a very derived bird that reverted to or retains some plesiomorphic traits.

According to Suh et al. (2016), one of the problems with the conclusions about this novel taxon is that independent studies (like Jarvis et al. 2014 and Prum et al. 2015) found very dissimilar phylogenetic relationships (like Gruae) using the same probabilistic support, such as bootstrap scores and Bayesian posterior probabilities.

== See also ==
- Gruae for an alternative hypothesis on the placement of the hoatzin
