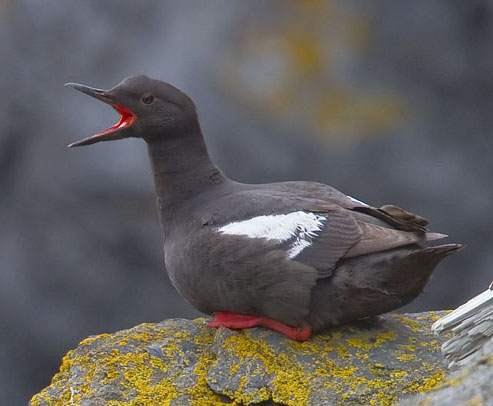
- Pigeon guillemot (Cepphus columba)

Scientific classification
- Kingdom: Animalia
- Phylum: Chordata
- Class: Aves
- Clade: Neoaves
- Clade: Litusilvanae; Wu et al., 2024

Clades
- Gruae; Strisores

= Litusilvanae =

Litusilvanae Temporal range: Paleocene (Danian) to recent 61.7–0 Ma Possible Late Cretaceous origin based on molecular clock

Taxon of neoavian birds

Litusilvanae is a taxon of birds, position as the sister clade to Aequorlitornithes. This clade comprises Gruae (Opisthocomiformes and Gruimorphae (orders Charadriiformes and Gruiformes)) and Strisores (the order Caprimulgiformes and the clade Vanescaves). While different lines of evidence from molecular, morphology and the fossil record has found support in the clades Gruimorphae and Strisores Wu et al. (2024) was the first to find support in such a novel sister group relationship between these two taxa.
