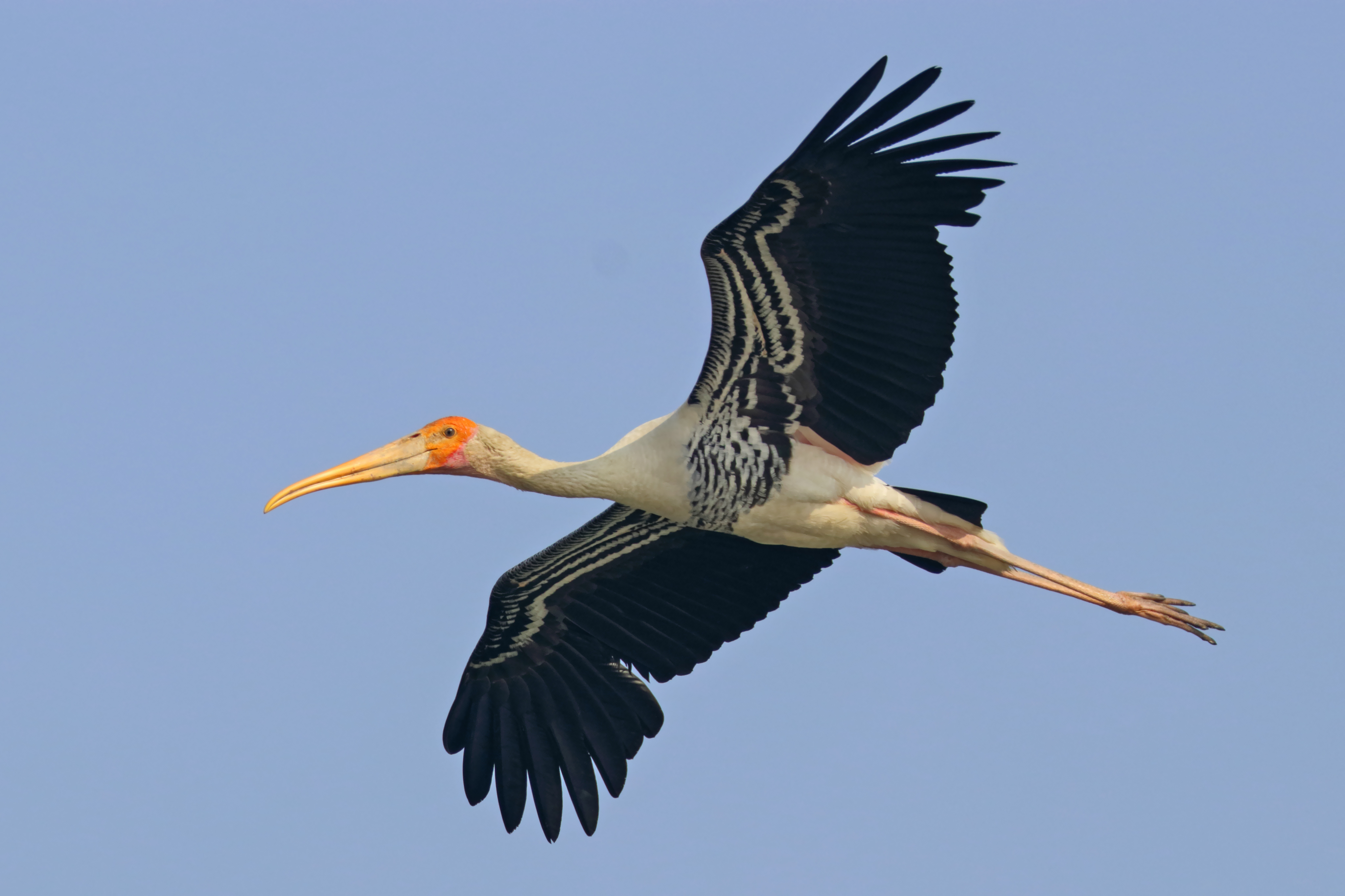
- Painted stork (Mycteria leucocephala)

Scientific classification
- Kingdom: Animalia
- Phylum: Chordata
- Class: Aves
- Clade: Neoaves
- Clade: Aequorlitornithes; Prum et al., 2015

Clades
- Charadriiformes; Mirandornithes; Phaethoquornithes

= Aequorlitornithes =

Aequorlitornithes Temporal range: Paleocene–Recent

Taxon of birds

Aequorlitornithes is a taxon of waterbirds recovered in a comprehensive genomic systematic study using nearly 200 species in 2015. It contains the clades Charadriiformes (waders and shorebirds), Mirandornithes (flamingos and grebes) and Phaethoquornithes (Eurypygimorphae and Aequornithes). Previous studies have found different placement for the clades in the tree.

- Aequorlitornithes
  - - Mirandornithes (flamingos and grebes)
    - Charadriiformes (shorebirds)
  - Phaethoquornithes
    - Eurypygimorphae (sunbittern, kagu and tropicbirds)
    - Aequornithes (loons, penguins, herons, pelicans, storks, etc)

A 2024 study used Aequorlitornithes for a similar clade, which they recovered as part of Aquaterraves. This clade also included Opisthocomiformes and excluded Charadriiformes, which they recovered in Litusilvanae, a novel clade within Aquaterraves, which also included Gruiformes and Caprimulgimorphae.
