= Wakinosaurus =

Wakinosaurus Temporal range: Early Cretaceous, 136–125 Ma

Scientific classification
- Kingdom: Animalia
- Phylum: Chordata
- Class: Reptilia
- Clade: Dinosauria
- Clade: Saurischia
- Clade: Theropoda
- Genus: †Wakinosaurus; Okazaki, 1992
- Species: †W. satoi

Binomial name
- †Wakinosaurus satoi Okazaki, 1992

Extinct genus of dinosaurs

Wakinosaurus (meaning "Wakino lizard") is a genus of possible carcharodontosaurid theropod dinosaur from the Early Cretaceous (Valanginian-Barremian) Sengoku Formation of Kyushu, Japan. The genus is a tooth taxon, based solely on the middle section of a single tooth.

== Discovery and naming ==
In 1990 the ice hockey player Masahiro Sato in Fukuoka found the tooth of a theropod. The same year Yoshihiko Okazaki first reported on the find. In 1992 Okazaki named the type species, Wakinosaurus satoi. The generic name refers to the Wakino Subgroup of the Kwanmon Group, of which the Sengoku Formation is a member. The specific name honours Sato.

== Description ==
The holotype is KMNH VP 000,016, a single damaged tooth, the crown of which must have been about seven centimetres long. Its base length is 32.9 millimetres (1.30 in), its base width 10.4 millimetres (0.41 in). It has about thirty serrations per five millimetres.

== Classification ==
Wakinosaurus was initially described as a megalosaurid but is today considered a nomen dubium and an indeterminate neotheropod. The holotype tooth is similar to a leaf with fine cutting serrations on both edges and according to Okazaki, it is similar to those of "Prodeinodon" kwangshiensis, which is also a dubious tooth taxon. In 2020, it was suggested that Wakinosaurus may represent a basal carcharodontosaurid theropod similar to Acrocanthosaurus.
