= Hoazinoides =

Hoazinoides Temporal range: Mid Miocene (Laventan) ~13.8–11.8 Ma

Scientific classification
- Kingdom: Animalia
- Phylum: Chordata
- Class: Aves
- Order: Opisthocomiformes
- Family: Opisthocomidae
- Genus: †Hoazinoides; A. H. Miller, 1953
- Species: †H. magdalenae

Binomial name
- †Hoazinoides magdalenae Miller, 1953

Extinct genus of birds

Hoazinoides is an extinct genus of birds from the Middle Miocene (Laventan) from the "Monkey Beds" of the Villavieja Formation of the Honda Group at the Konzentrat-Lagerstätte of La Venta, Colombia.

== Description ==
It is a member of the family Opisthocomidae, which also includes the hoatzin and several other extinct genera. The only known species is Hoazinoides magdalenae. Its generic epithet refers to its resemblance to modern hoatzin, and its specific name refers to its discovery near the Magdalena River basin. Like many other fossil birds, it is known from fragmentary remains, including the back portion of the skull, the specimen UCMP 42823 and other bones of the extremities. From these remains it appears that this bird was similar to that of hoatzin, although smaller, and distinguished from it in the parietal wall of the skull is concave and the coracoid and sternum were not fused. This is why Tab Rasmussen (1997) erected a new family, Hoazinoididae, for it. Its feet were like those of modern owls, in which the fourth toe can rotate backwards. Additionally, the remains of its distal ulna and carpal-metacarpal suggest that its arms were similar to those of hoatzins.
