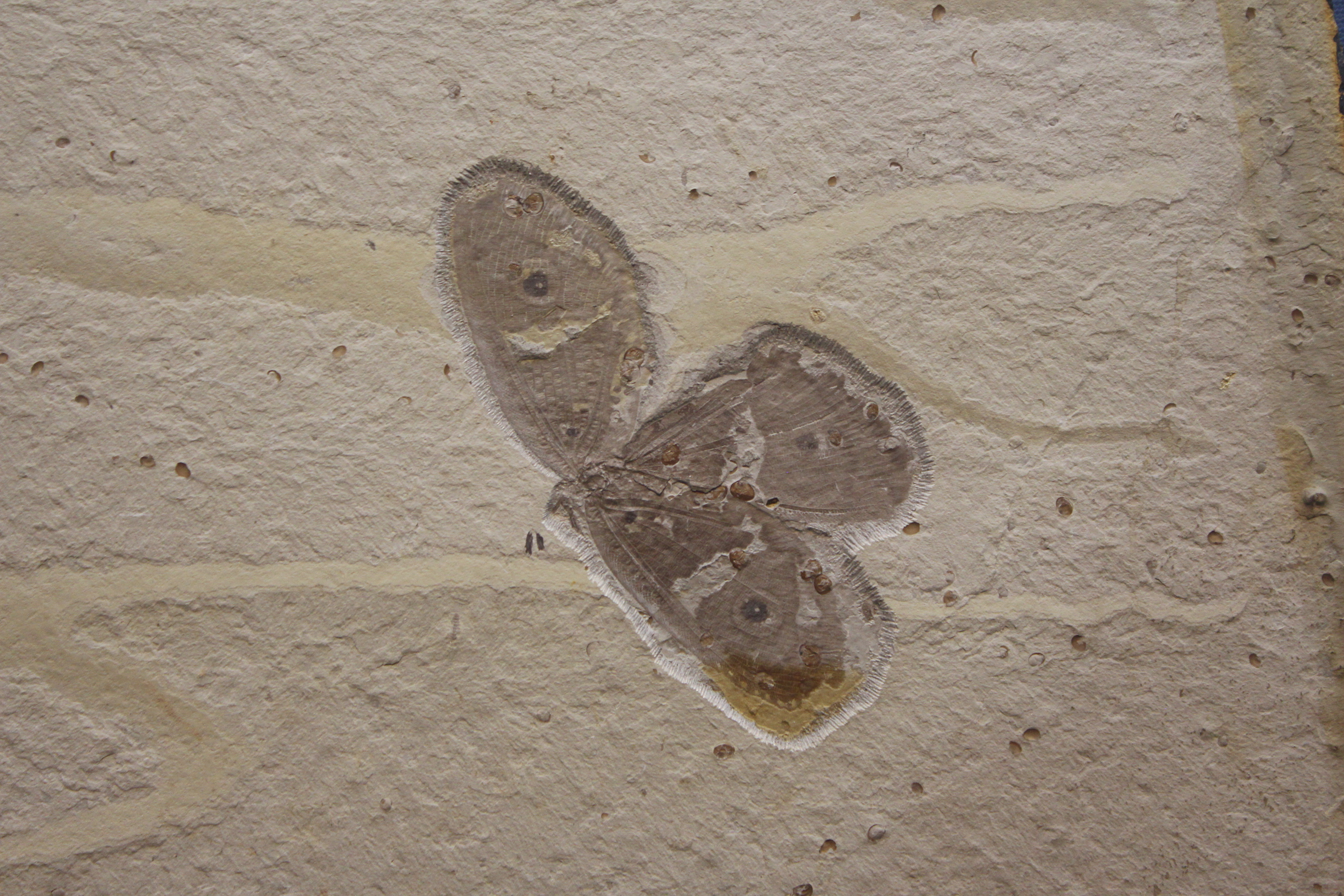
- Fossil specimen on display at the National Natural History Museum of China

Scientific classification
- Domain: Eukaryota
- Kingdom: Animalia
- Phylum: Arthropoda
- Class: Insecta
- Order: Neuroptera
- Family: †Kalligrammatidae
- Genus: †Kalligramma; Walther, 1904

= Kalligramma =

Extinct genus of winged insect

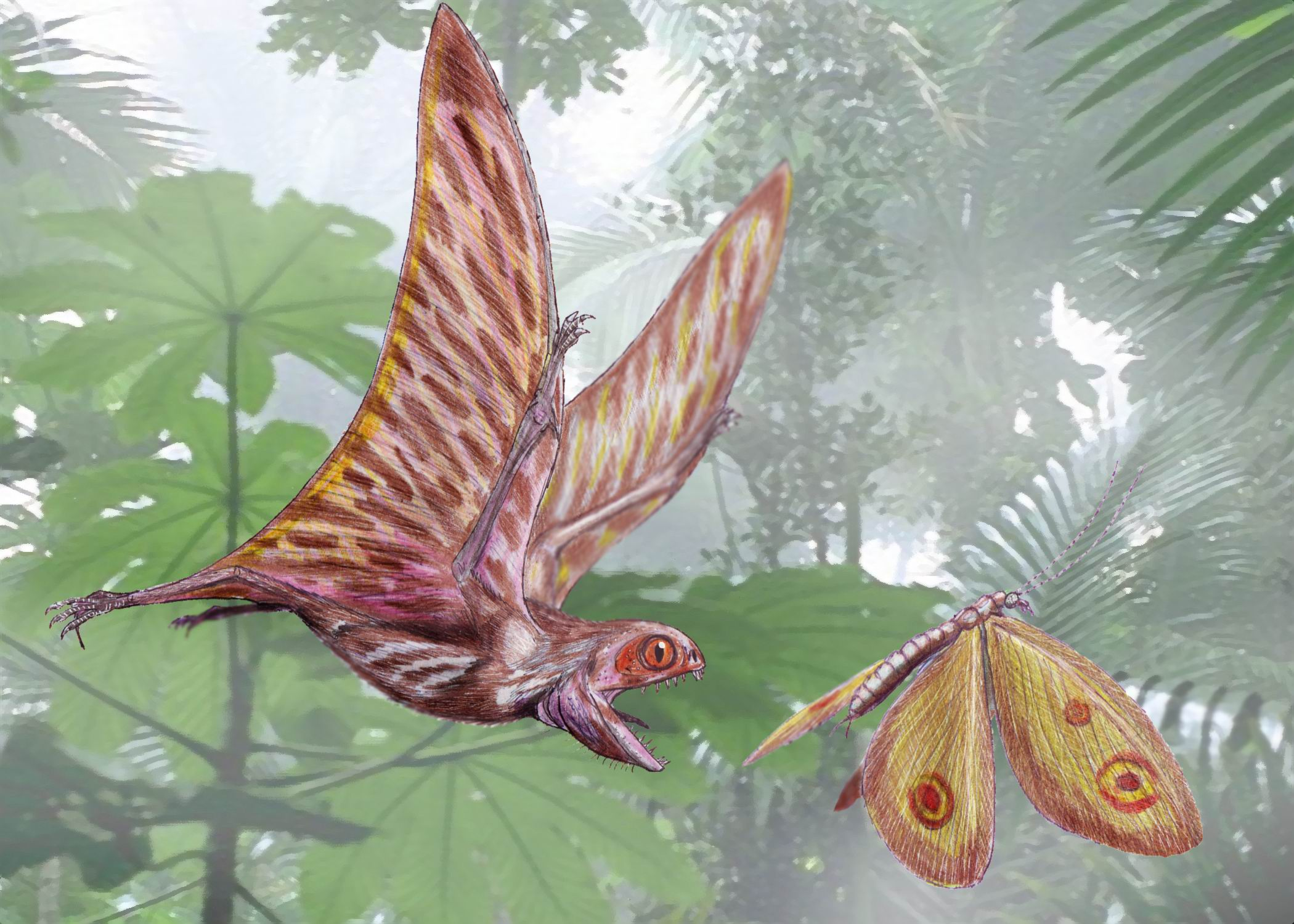
Restoration of Kalligramma being chased by Anurognathus

Kalligramma is a prehistoric genus of winged insects in the family Kalligrammatidae.

Species

- Kalligramma albifasciatum Yang et al., 2014
- Kalligramma brachyrhyncha Yang et al., 2014
- Kalligramma circularia Yang et al., 2014
- Kalligramma delicatum Liu et al., 2015
- Kalligramma elegans Yang et al., 2014
- Kalligramma flexuosum Panfilov, 1968
- Kalligramma haeckeli Walther, 1904
- Kalligramma jurarchegonium Zhang and Zhang, 2003
- Kalligramma liaoningense Ren and Guo, 1996
- Kalligramma multinerve Panfilov, 1968
- Kalligramma paradoxum Liu et al., 2014
- Kalligramma sharovi Panfilov, 1968
