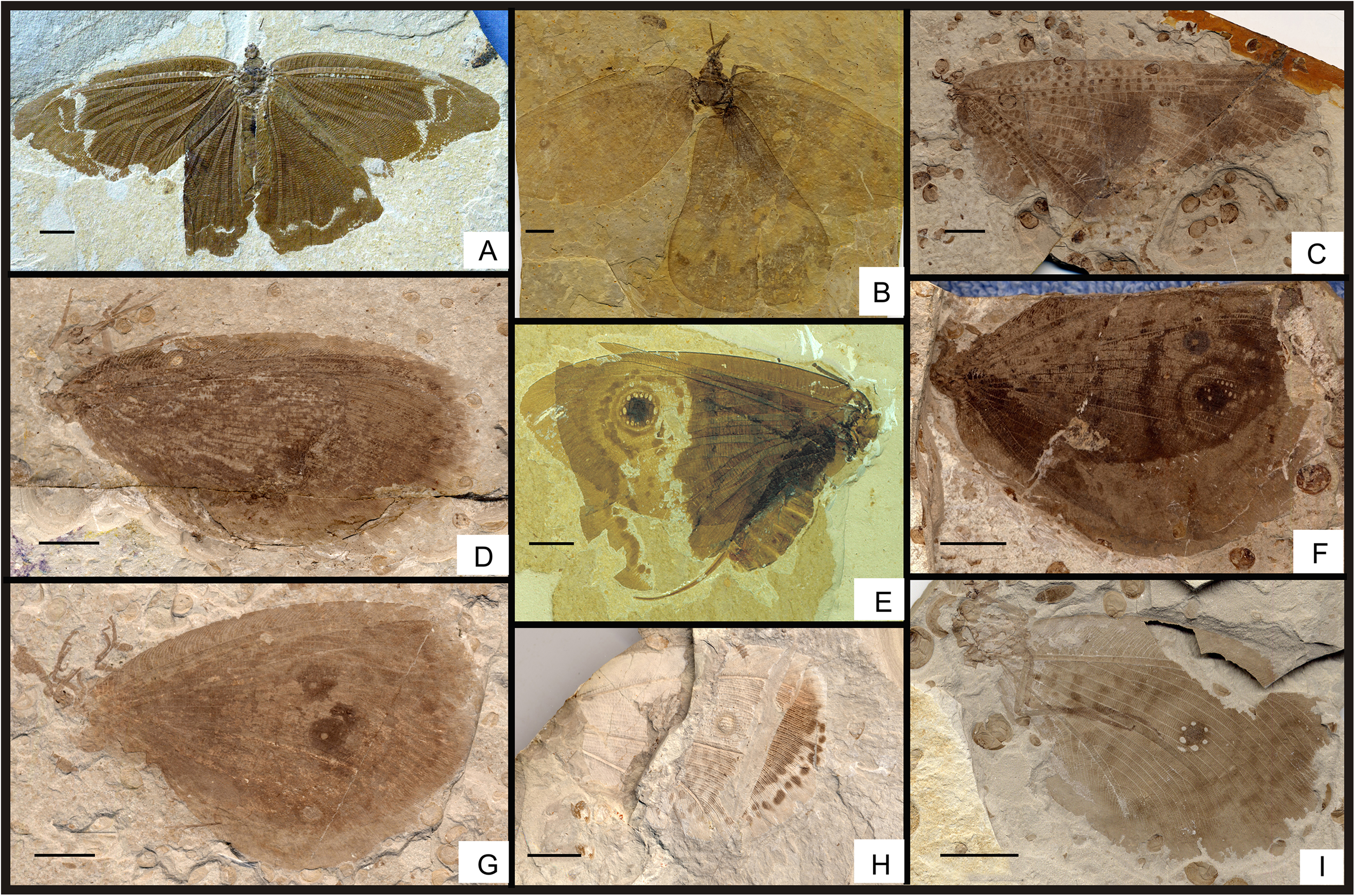
- Kalligrammatid diversity

Scientific classification
- Kingdom: Animalia
- Phylum: Arthropoda
- Clade: Pancrustacea
- Class: Insecta
- Order: Neuroptera
- Superfamily: Psychopsoidea
- Family: †Kalligrammatidae; Handlirsch, 1906

Subfamilies
- Kalligrammatinae; Kallihemerobiinae; Liassopsychopinae; Meioneurinae; Oregrammatinae; Sophogrammatinae; and see text

= Kalligrammatidae =

Kalligrammatidae Temporal range: Toarcian-Cenomanian ~183–94 Ma

Extinct family of insects

Kalligrammatidae, sometimes known as kalligrammatids or kalligrammatid lacewings, is a family of extinct insects in the order Neuroptera (lacewings) that contains twenty genera and a number of species. The family lived from the Middle Jurassic to the early Late Cretaceous before going extinct. Species of the family are known from Europe, Asia, and South America. The family has been occasionally described as "butterflies of the Jurassic" based on their resemblance to modern butterflies in morphology and ecological niche.

== Range ==
The known distribution of Kalligrammatidae is widespread both in time and in location. Fossils of the family have been recovered from sediments in Western Europe, the British Isles, Central Asia, and China. The majority of described species, thirty one, are from Jurassic and Cretaceous fossils found in China. Eight species are known from Kazakhstan, the second largest number of species for a single country, while only two species are represented by fossils found in Russia, though only one is described due to the incomplete nature of the other specimen. One species has been described from Mongolia. Species from Europe are much less common, with four species from Germany and one species from England. Only one genus has been described from the Western Hemisphere, with two species found in Brazil. Six of the genera have been found at two or more locations; Kalligrammula and Kalligramma are the most widely distributed genera.

Jurassic species are found in both Asia and Europe. The oldest described species are from the early Toarcian Posidonia Shale in Germany, with the next youngest being from the Callovian Haifanggou and Daohugou Formations in China. Cretaceous species are less common, but still found across Eurasia, the youngest being from China and Britain and the family lasting until the Aptian in Brazil (Crato Formation). In 2018, it was recognised that the subfamily Cretanallachiinae from the Burmese amber, formerly assigned to Dilaridae, belonged to Kalligrammatidae, extending the range of the family into the early Late Cretaceous.

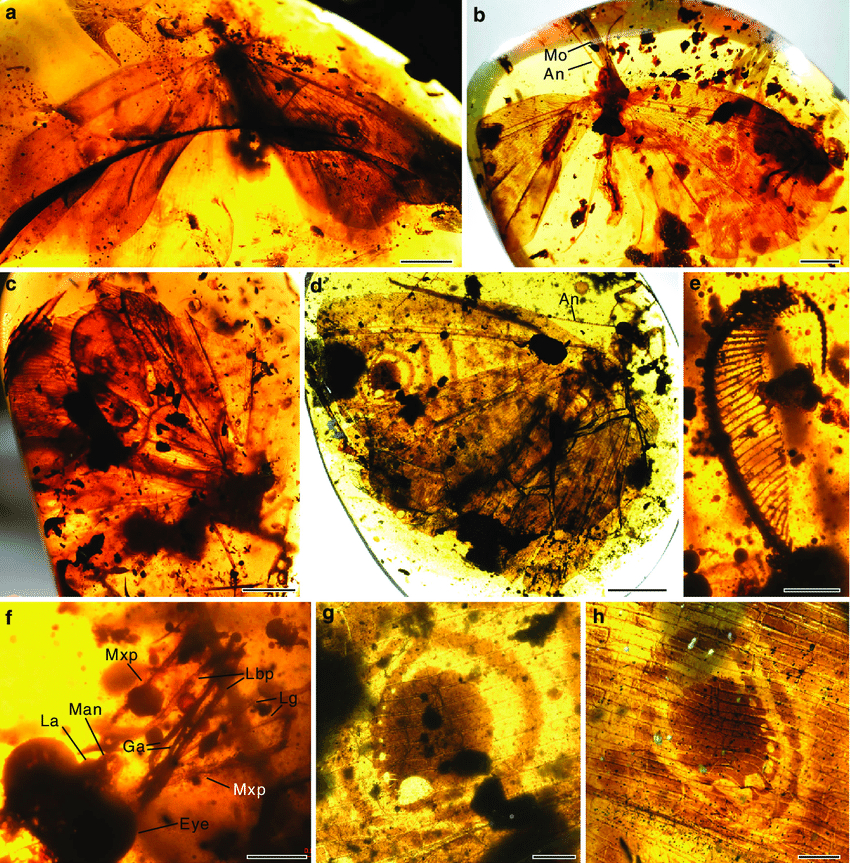
Burmogramma liui in Burmese amber from various views

== Morphology ==
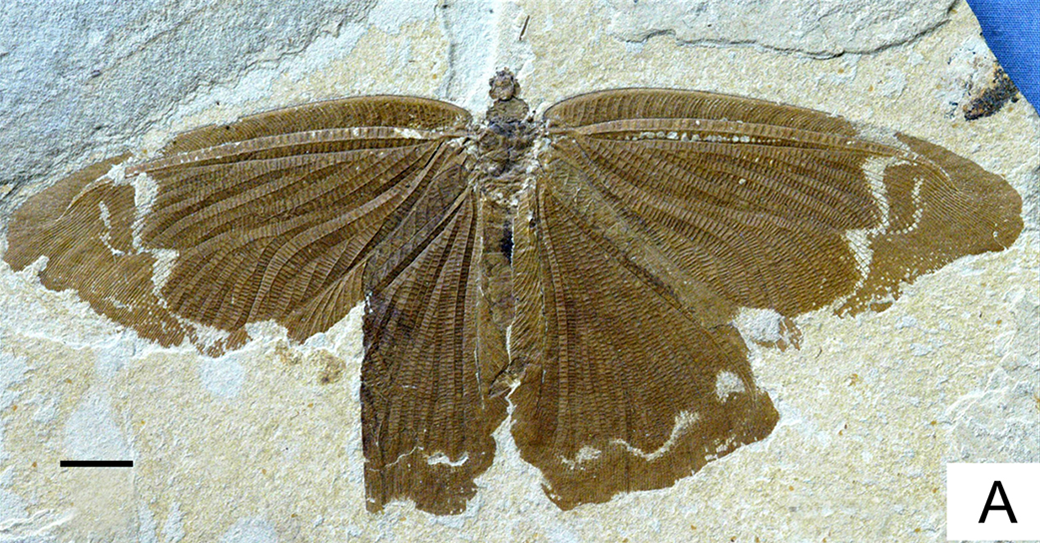
Sophogramma lii with disruptive coloration

Most species are known from compression-impression fossils preserved in layers of soft sedimentary rock. Many of the species are known only from isolated fore or hind wings, though full bodies are known for some species. Species are typified by bodies that are over 50 mm (2.0 in) long when known and covered in dense layers of setae. The antennae are generally not longer than the length of the fore wings and have a simple filiform structure. There is variation in the mouthparts, which commonly are 11–25 mm (0.43–0.98 in) long siphon shaped proboscis, but some basal species have more distinct mandibles. The proboscis is formed from the same mouth parts as those of Nymphalidae butterflies and were used for probing and sucking. Species of at least one genus, Oregramma, have elongated lance shaped ovipositors. The wings are distinctly large, over 50 mm (2.0 in) long, often with centrally placed eye spots and the ovoid to triangular wings have numerous closely spaced branching veins. Most of the species also have distinctly developed wing scales, a feature seen in Lepidopterans. Two types of scales are seen in the kalligrammatids, shorter scales with a broad base that taper to a tip, and longer narrow scales with a spatulate shape. The species Makarkinia adamsi has the longest forewing of any neuropteran species, estimated at 160 mm (6.3 in).

== Paleobiology ==
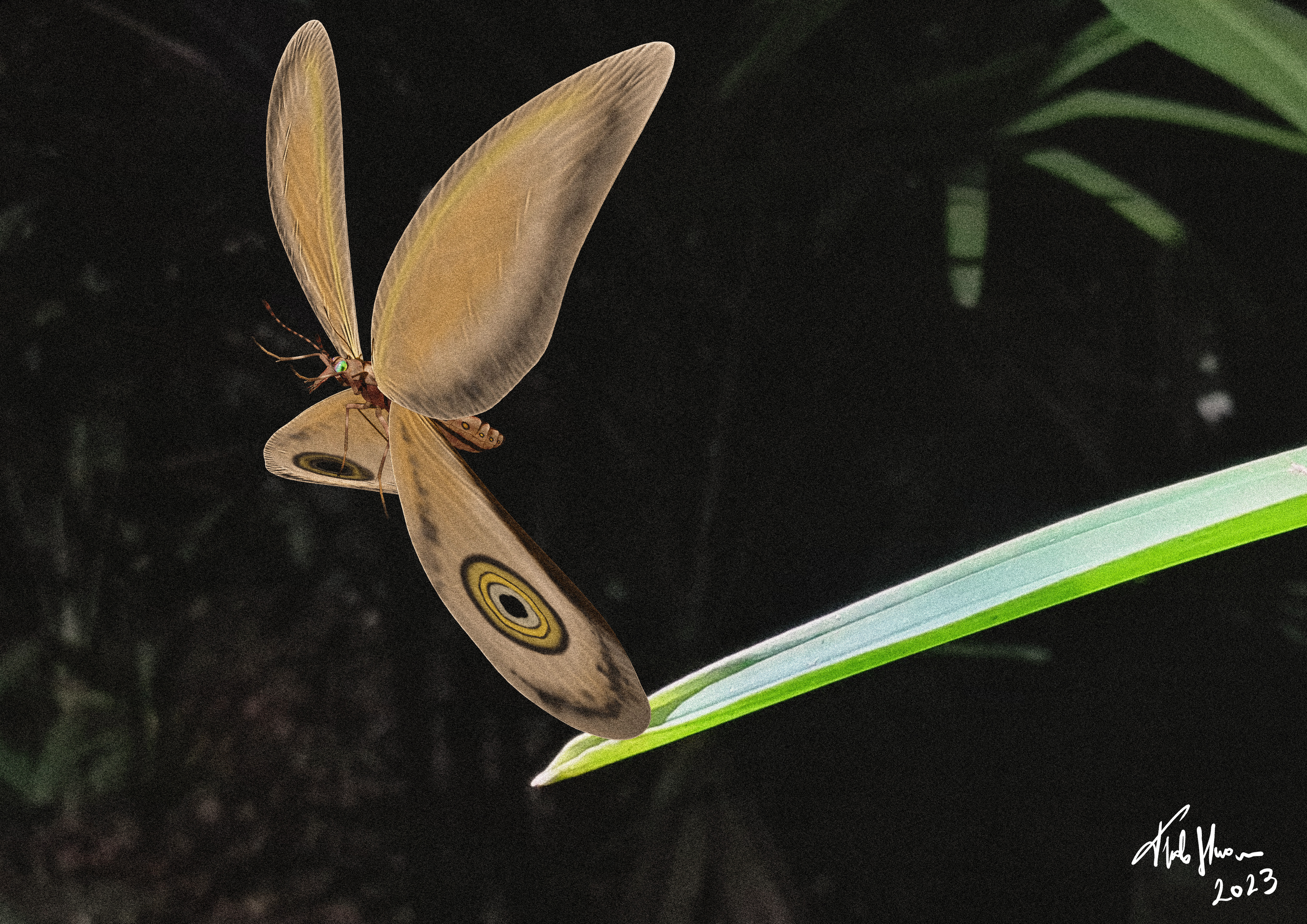
Life restoration of Makarkinia irmae

It is thought that their large body size and large wings would have made kalligrammatids weak fliers. Wing color patterning on many species and the setae covering on Makarkinia are indications that the species were day-time fliers similar to butterflies. The prevalence of eye spots in many species, the presence of light striping along the wing margins of Sophogramma were evolved to act as anti-predator adaptations against predation from pterosaurs and early birds. Given the structuring of the mouthparts, they are thought to have most likely been pollinators, feeding on pollen and plant juices, possibly produced by Bennettitales and Cheirolepidiaceae. The pollination behavior is nearly unique in the Neuroptera, most of which are predatory. The similarity of features and ecology between lepidopterans and kaligrammatids has led to the group occasionally being called "butterflies of the Jurassic". The only modern neuropteran family that feeds on pollen is Nemopteridae, and kalligrammatids are the only neuropterans which have developed proboscises. As flowering plants emerged and diversified, the host plants of kalligrammatids dwindled, possibly resulting in their extinction.

== Taxonomy ==
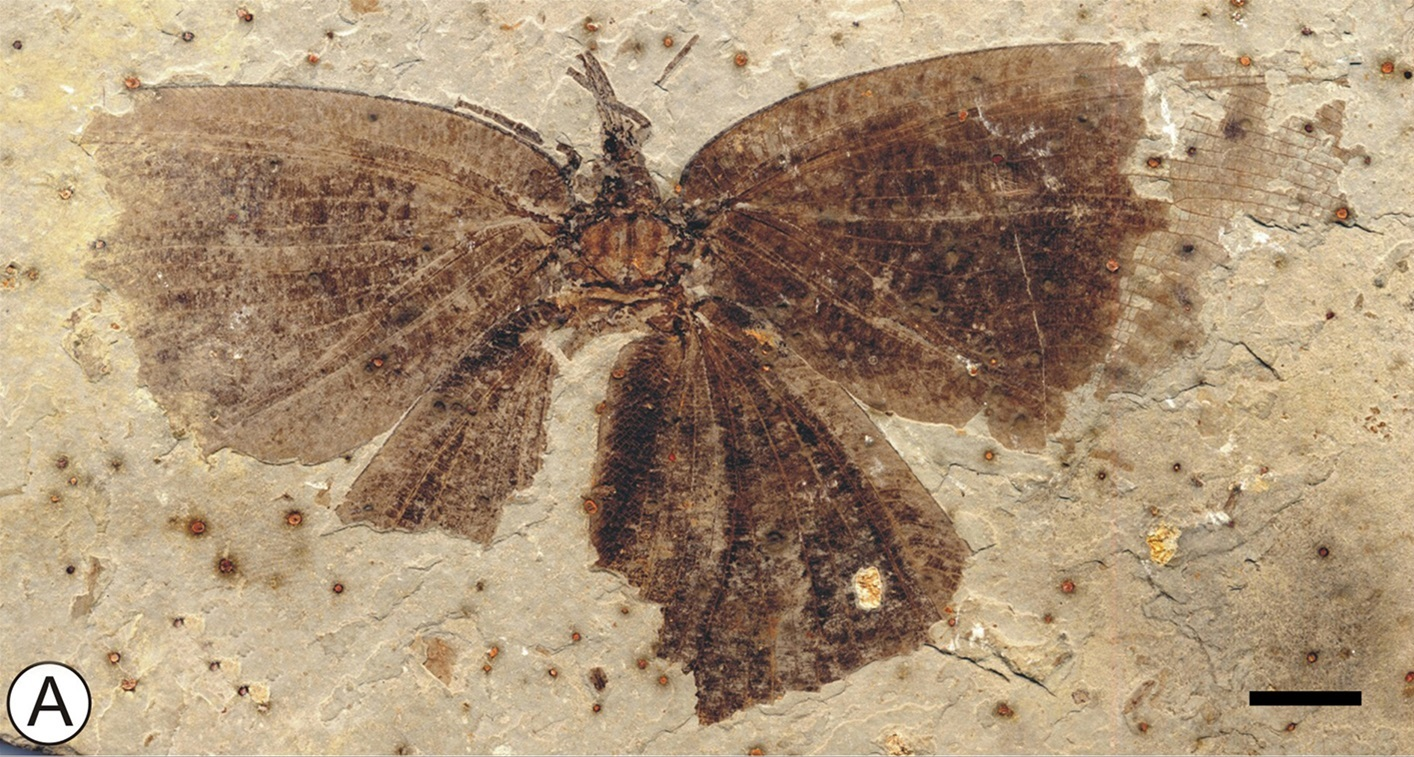
Abrigramma calophleba

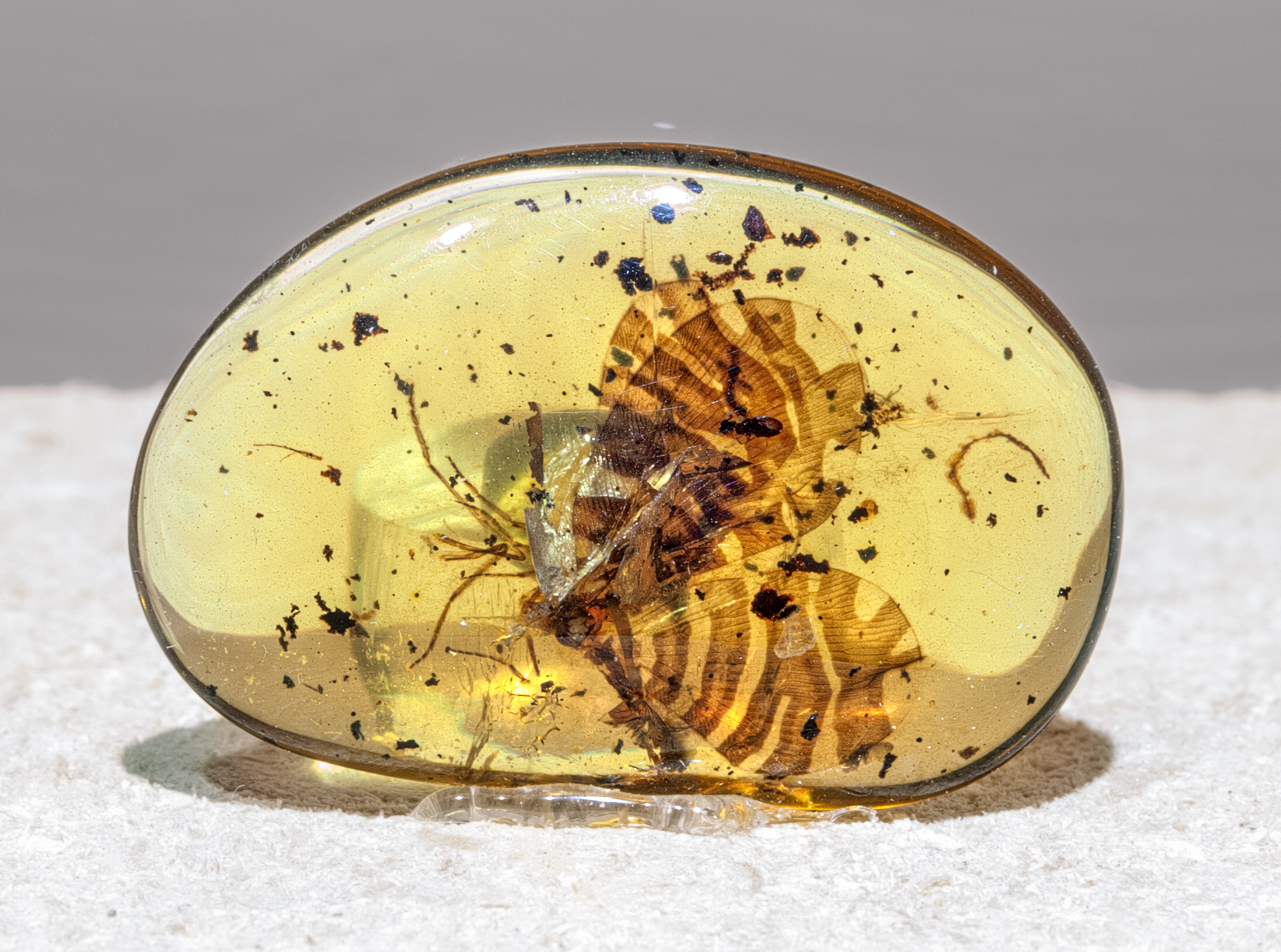
Unidentified kalligrammatid included in Burmese amber

There are currently six described subfamilies of kalligrammatid, with all but two genera placed into them. The remaining two genera Makarkinia and Palparites have been left incertae sedis.

Kalligrammatinae

Angarogramma
Kalligramma
Kalligrammina
Limnogramma
Sinokalligramma

Kallihemerobiinae

Affinigramma
Apochrysogramma
Kalligrammula
Kallihemerobius
Lithogramma
Ophtalmogramma
Stelligramma

Liassopsychopinae

Liassopsychops
Huiyingogramma

Meioneurinae

Meioneurites

Oregrammatinae

Abrigramma
Ithigramma
Oregramma

Sophogrammatinae

Protokalligramma
Sophogramma

Cretanallachiinae

Cretanallachius
Burmogramma
Burmopsychops
Cretogramma
Oligopsychopsis

incertae sedis

Makarkinia
Palparites

=== Phylogeny ===
A phylogeny of the family was produced in 2014 by a team of researchers showing the family to have 4 distinct subfamily clades. A placement of Palparites was not made due to the incomplete nature of the only fossil known, and Makarkninia was not included in the paper, as the second more complete species was not described until 2016.

- Kalligrammatidae
  - Sophogrammatinae
    - Sophogramma
    - Protokalligramma
  - - - Meioneurinae
        Meioneurites
      - Oregrammatinae
        - Abrigramma
        - - Oregramma
          - Ithigramma
    - - Kalligramminae
        - Kalligramma
        - Limnogramma
        - Sinokalligramma
        - Kalligrammina
        - Angarogramma
      - Kallihemerobiinae
        - Stelligramma
        - - Kalligrammula
          - Huiyingogramma
        - - Lithogramma
          - - Affinigramma
            - - Apochrysogramma
              - Kallihemerobius
