= Hoazinavis =

Hoazinavis Temporal range: Late Oligocene-Early Miocene (Deseadan) ~24–22 Ma

Scientific classification
- Domain: Eukaryota
- Kingdom: Animalia
- Phylum: Chordata
- Class: Aves
- Order: Opisthocomiformes
- Family: Opisthocomidae
- Genus: †Hoazinavis; Mayr et al., 2011
- Species: †H. lacustris

Binomial name
- †Hoazinavis lacustris Mayr et al., 2011

Extinct genus of birds

Hoazinavis is an extinct genus of bird related to the hoatzin from Late Oligocene and Early Miocene (about 24–22 mya) deposits of Brazil. It was collected in 2008 from the Tremembé Formation of São Paulo, Brazil. It was first named by Gerald Mayr, Herculano Alvarenga and Cécile Mourer-Chauviré in 2011 and the type species is Hoazinavis lacustris.
