= Namibiavis =

Namibiavis Temporal range: 16 Ma

Scientific classification
- Kingdom: Animalia
- Phylum: Chordata
- Class: Aves
- Order: Opisthocomiformes
- Family: Opisthocomidae
- Genus: †Namibiavis; Mourer-Chauviré, 2003
- Species: †N. senutae

Binomial name
- †Namibiavis senutae Mourer-Chauviré, 2003

Extinct genus of birds

Namibiavis is an extinct genus of bird related to the hoatzin from early Middle Miocene (about 16 mya) deposits of Namibia. It was collected from Arrisdrift, southern Namibia. It was first named by Cécile Mourer-Chauviré in 2003 and the type species is Namibiavis senutae.
