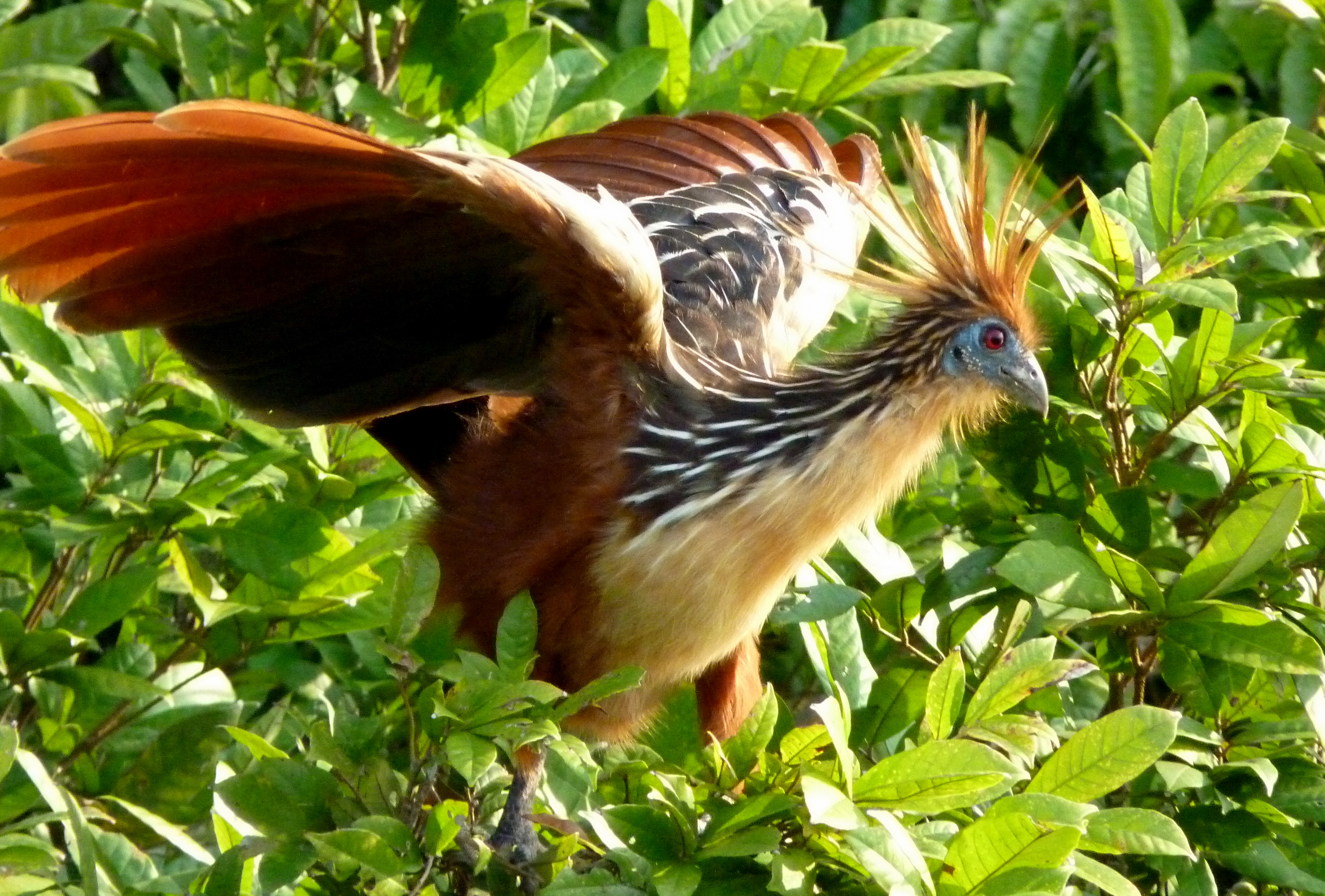
- Hoatzin (Opisthocomus hoazin)
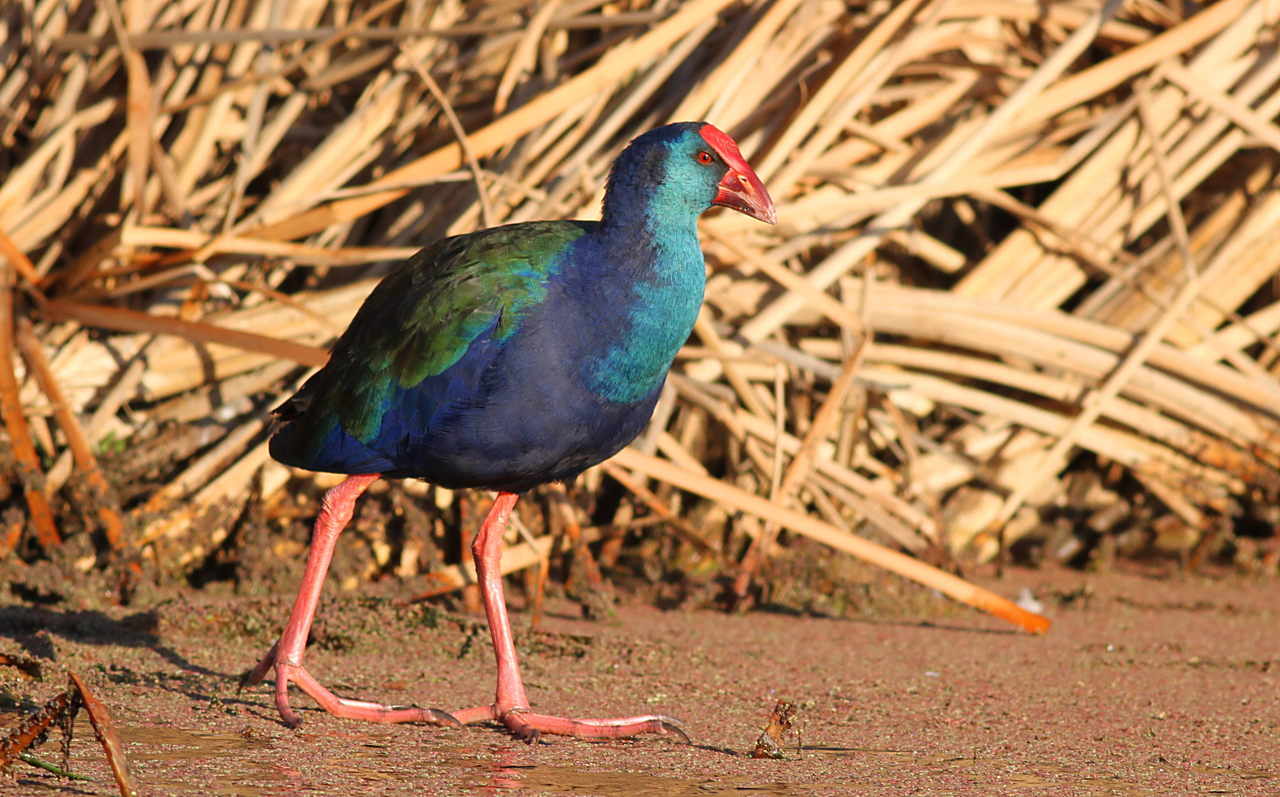
- African swamphen (Porphyrio madagascariensis)

Scientific classification
- Kingdom: Animalia
- Phylum: Chordata
- Class: Aves
- Infraclass: Neognathae
- Clade: Neoaves
- Clade: Elementaves
- (unranked): Gruae; Bonaparte, 1854

Subgroups
- Opisthocomiformes; Gruimorphae

= Gruae =

Gruae Temporal range: Paleocene - Holocene, 60–0 Ma

Taxon of birds

Gruae is a taxon of birds that contains the order Opisthocomiformes (hoatzin) and Gruimorphae (shorebirds and rails) identified in 2014 by genome analysis. Previous studies have placed the Hoatzin in different parts of the bird family tree; however, despite its unusual and primitive morphology, genetic studies have shown the hoatzin is not as primitive or as ancient as once thought, and that it could be a very derived bird that reverted to or retains some plesiomorphic traits.

- Gruae
  - Opisthocomiformes (hoatzin)
  - Gruimorphae
    - Gruiformes (rails and cranes)
    - Charadriiformes (shorebirds)

According to Suh et al. (2016), one of the problems with the conclusions about this novel clade is that independent studies (like Jarvis et al. 2014 and Prum et al. 2015) found very dissimilar phylogenetic relationships (like Inopinaves) using the same probabilistic support, such as bootstrap scores and Bayesian posterior probabilities.

== See also ==
- Inopinaves for an alternative hypothesis on the placement of the Hoatzin
