= Masahiro Sato =

Japanese ice hockey player

Personal information
- Nationality: Japanese
- Born: 27 October 1936 (age 88); Kanagawa, Japan

Sport
- Sport: Ice hockey

Masahiro Sato (佐藤 真弘, Satō Masahiro, born 27 October 1936) is a Japanese ice hockey player. He competed in the men's tournament at the 1964 Winter Olympics.

== Discovery of Wakinosaurus ==
In 1990, Masahiro Sato in Fukuoka found the tooth of a theropod dinosaur. The same year, Yoshihiko Okazaki first reported on the find. In 1992, Okazaki named the type species, Wakinosaurus satoi. The generic name refers to the Wakino Subgroup of the Kwanmon Group, of which the Sengoku Formation is a member. The specific name honours Sato.
