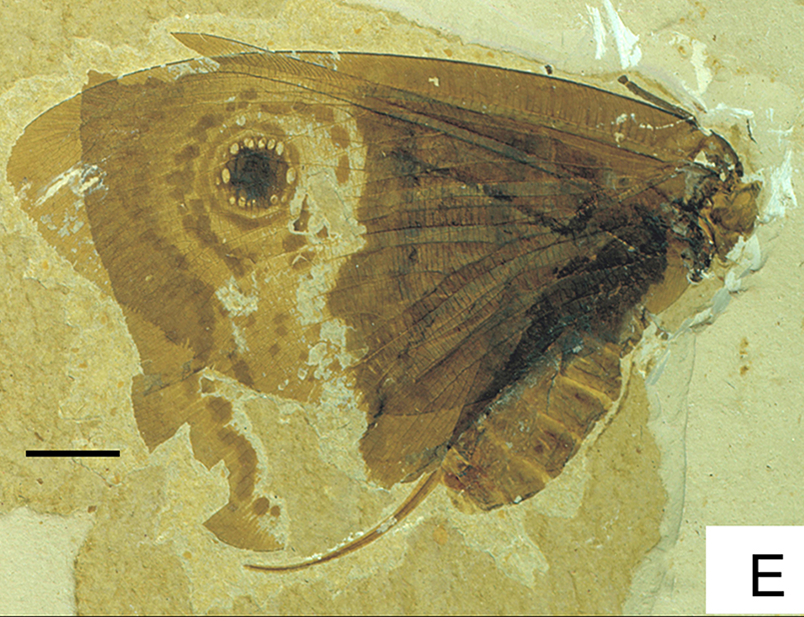
- Oregramma illecebrosa

Scientific classification
- Kingdom: Animalia
- Phylum: Arthropoda
- Class: Insecta
- Order: Neuroptera
- Family: †Kalligrammatidae
- Subfamily: †Oregrammatinae
- Genus: †Oregramma; Ren 2003

Species
- Oregramma illecebrosa; Oregramma gloriosa; Oregramma aureolusa

= Oregramma =

Oregramma Temporal range: 125–122 Ma

Extinct genus of insects

Oregramma is a genus of "butterfly mimicking" lacewing in the extinct family Kalligrammatidae. Fossils of this genus have been found in the Early Cretaceous Yixian Formation of China. It likely fed on pollen and plant juices, unlike modern lacewings, most of which are carnivorous.
