= Protoazin =

Protoazin Temporal range: Late Eocene 36 Ma

Scientific classification
- Kingdom: Animalia
- Phylum: Chordata
- Class: Aves
- Order: Opisthocomiformes
- Family: Opisthocomidae
- Genus: †Protoazin; Mayr & De Pietri 2014
- Species: †P. parisiensis

Binomial name
- †Protoazin parisiensis Mayr & De Pietri, 2014

Extinct genus of birds

Protoazin is an extinct genus of bird related to the hoatzin from late Eocene (about 36 mya) deposits of France.
