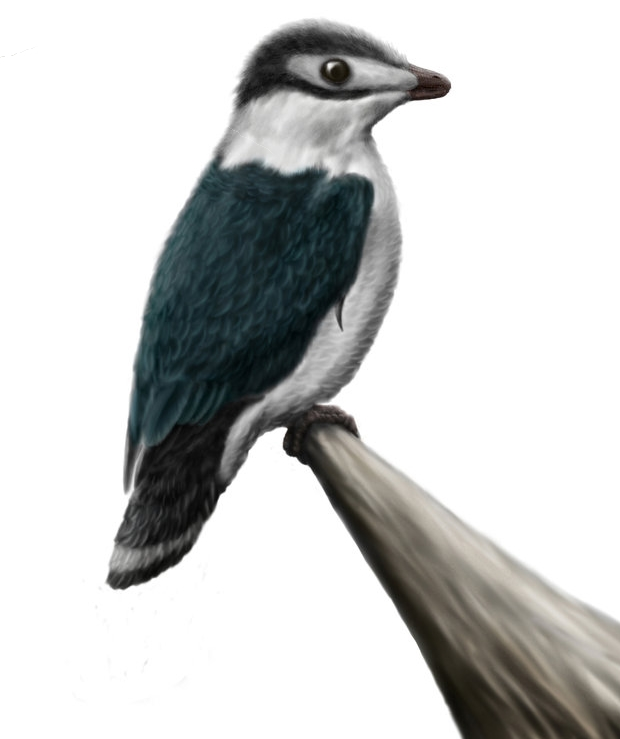
- Reconstruction of Iberomesornis romerali

Scientific classification
- Domain: Eukaryota
- Kingdom: Animalia
- Phylum: Chordata
- Clade: Dinosauria
- Clade: Saurischia
- Clade: Theropoda
- Clade: Avialae
- Clade: †Enantiornithes
- Order: †Iberomesornithiformes; Sanz & Bonaparte, 1992
- Family: †Iberomesornithidae; Sanz & Bonaparte, 1992

Type species
- †Iberomesornis romerali Sanz & Bonaparte, 1992

Genera
- †Iberomesornis; †Noguerornis

= Iberomesornithidae =

Iberomesornithids Temporal range: Early Cretaceous, 130–125 Ma

Extinct family of birds

Iberomesornithidae is an extinct family of enantiornithine birds.

- Order Iberomesornithiformes
  - Family Iberomesornithidae
    - Enantiornithes gen. et sp. indet. CAGS-IG-07-CM-001
    - Iberomesornis (Early Cretaceous)
    - Noguerornis (Early Cretaceous)
