= Sengoku Formation =

Geologic formation in Japan

- Stratigraphic range: Early Cretaceous (Hauterivian-Barremian)
- Type: Geological formation
- Unit of: Wakino Subgroup of the Kwanmon Group

Location
- Region: Kyushu
- Country: Japan

The Sengoku Formation is an Early Cretaceous geologic formation. Dinosaur remains diagnostic to the genus level are among the fossils that have been recovered from the formation.

== Paleofauna ==
- Wakinosaurus satoi - "Incomplete tooth." - (Possible carcharodontosaurid)
- Adocus sengokuensis

== See also ==
- List of dinosaur-bearing rock formations
  - List of stratigraphic units with few dinosaur genera
