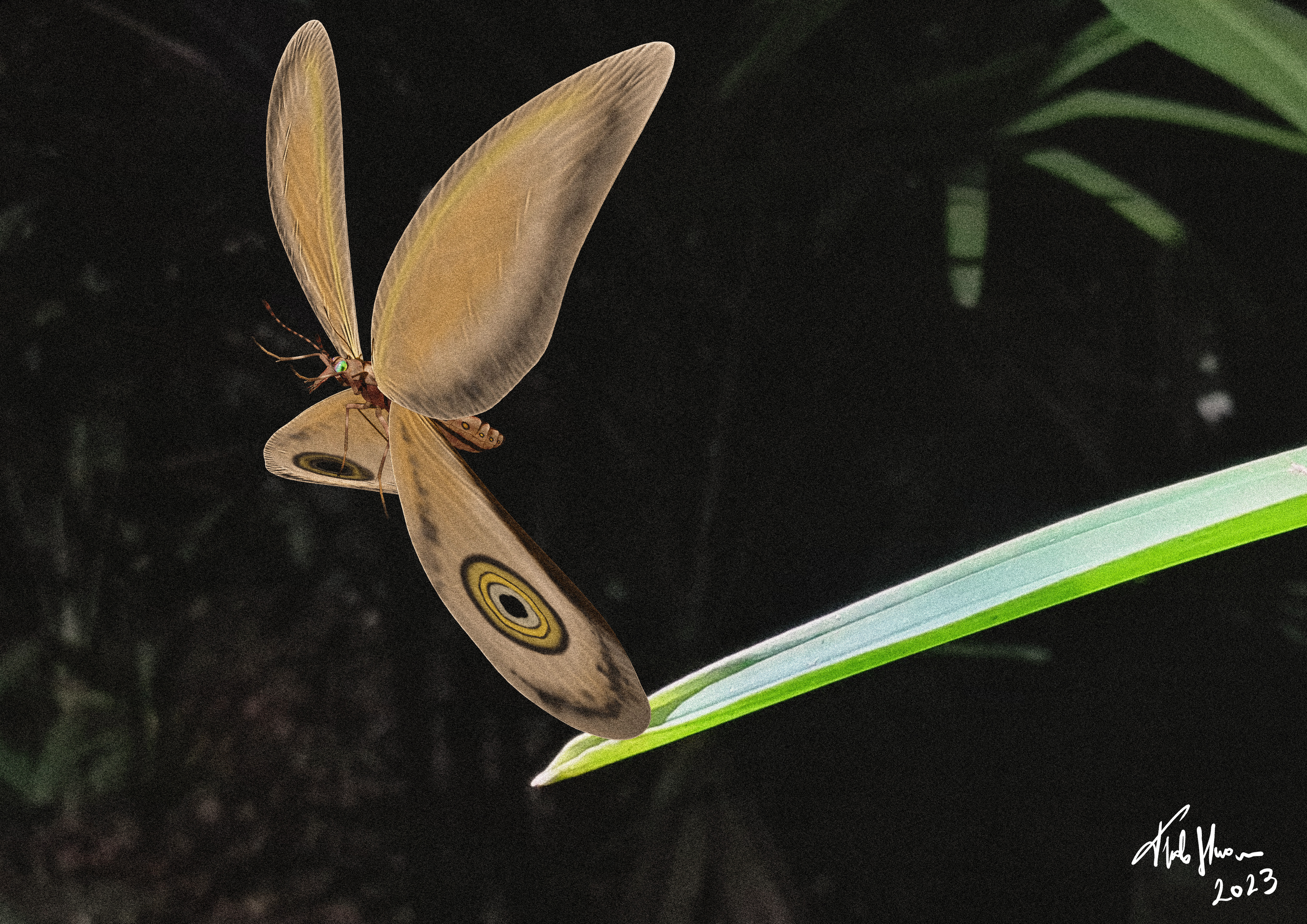
- Life restoration of M. irmae

Scientific classification
- Kingdom: Animalia
- Phylum: Arthropoda
- Class: Insecta
- Order: Neuroptera
- Family: †Kalligrammatidae
- Genus: †Makarkinia; Martins-Neto 1997

Species
- M. adamsi; M. kerneri; M. irmae

= Makarkinia =

Makarkinia Temporal range: Aptian ~115–113 Ma

Extinct genus of insects

Makarkinia is an extinct genus of lacewings in the family Kalligrammatidae described by Martins-Neto in 1997 from fossils found in the Crato Formation of the Araripe Basin in northeastern Brazil. The genus contains three species dating to the Late Aptian, Makarkinia adamsi, Makarkinia kerneri and Makarkinia irmae.

== History and classification ==
When first described, Makarkinia was known from a single fossil wing which is a compression-impression fossil preserved in layers of soft sedimentary rock. Along with other well-preserved insect fossils, the Makarkinia specimens were collected from layers of the Upper Aptian Crato Formation. The formation is composed of unweathered grey and oxidized yellow limestones, which preserved numerous insects, fish, birds and reptiles as a notable lagerstätten. The area is a preserved inland lake or one of a series of lakes, though the nature as a fresh or salt-water body is uncertain. The depth of the basin has been suggested as either shallow or fairly deep. The basin formed near the center of the supercontinent Gondwana during the early part of the diversification of flowering plants.

The M. adamsi holotype specimen was preserved in the National Museum of Brazil paleontological collection when first studied. The fossil was described by R. G. Martins-Neto in a 1992 paper on the neuropterans of the Crato Formation, with the species named in it. At the time of description the species was placed into the extinct family Panfiloviidae as Panfilovia adamsi. This placement was changed in a 1997 by Martins-Neto who moved the species to a new genus, Makarkinia and new subfamily "Makarkiniinae" in Panfiloviidae. Three years later Martins-Neto elevated the subfamily to a full family as Makarkiniidae, though this change was not widely used. It was suggested by Makarkin and Archibald in 2003 and subsequent authors that the genus was closely related to Kalligrammatidae, and moved into the family in 2016 by Günter Bechly and Vladimir Makarkin.

The second species described, M. kerneri, is known from the single holotype specimen residing in the Staatliches Museum für Naturkunde collections at the time of description. The fossil was first studied by Günter Bechly and Vladimir Makarkin who erected the species in a Cretaceous Research paper published in 2016. They coined the specific epithet kerneri to honor Andreas Kerner, who owned the fossil until its donation to the Staatliches Museum für Naturkunde.

When M. kerneri was described, Makarkinia was the only Kalligrammatidae genus known from the Americas, the other members of the family having been described from Asian and European fossils. Like other kalligrammatids, the environment of Makarkinia was subtropical to tropical in temperature, and color patterning of the fossils indicates they were daytime fliers. To lessen predation by other animals, large eye spots are found on the hindwings. The genus is the youngest member of the family to be described, living slightly after the last Eurasian genera from the early Aptian of China. Makarkinia also had the largest wing size of any living or fossil lacewing (indeed of any member of the order Neuroptera) and had an estimated maximum wing length of approximately 160 millimetres (6.3 in).

== Description ==
Makarkinia species are distinguished from other genera by the subcostal veinlets which notably curve toward the wing tip. The veinlets are forked with one to four small branches. The hindwings have a large distinct eye spot centered in the wing and surrounded by three concentric circles.

=== M. adamsi ===
The holotype wing is partially preserved and thought to be a possible forewing, though it is not whole enough to confirm. The estimated wing length is approximately 140–160 mm (5.5–6.3 in). No information is provided as how that inference was obtained, since it is known from too partial a fossil to reconstruct a whole wing, and wing length-width ratio is also unknown, since that is quite different among kalligrammatids.

=== M. kerneri ===
The overall size of the M. kerneri hindwing is smaller than M. adamsi, being 78 mm (3.1 in) and estimated between 100–120 mm (3.9–4.7 in) in full length. The costal vein starts fairly thick in the basal section of the wing and tapers down as it progresses toward the wing tip. The subcostal veinlets below the costa curve toward the wing tip and are fairly widely spaced. Between the major veins on most of the wing are many densely spaced crossveins, with the exception of between the veins at the wings tip end. The wing is covered in a coating of setae, very thick on the outer margins and major veins. On the thin veins running lengthwise along the wing and the crossveins the setae are thinner, arranged into three rows on the veins. The wing membrane has a coating of setae that thins out approaching the wing tip. The color pattering consists of a notable eye-spot that is 11 mm (0.43 in) in diameter, several darker longitudinal stripes and darkening of the costal area.

=== M. irmae ===
M. irmae is known from 77 millimetres (3.0 in) long hindwing fragment which preserves eye spot patterning.
