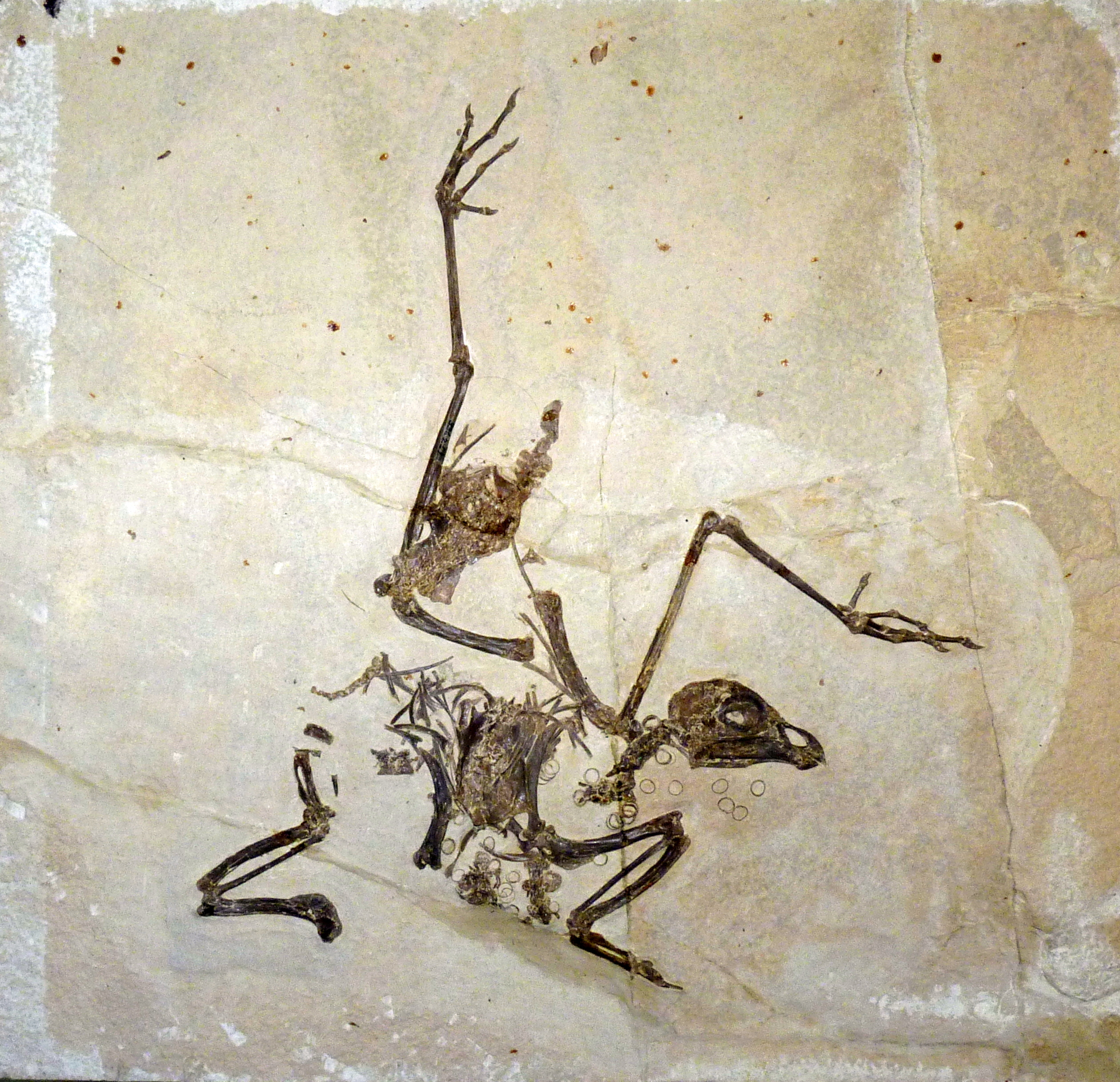
- Holotype

Scientific classification
- Kingdom: Animalia
- Phylum: Chordata
- Class: Aves
- Order: Musophagiformes
- Family: incertae sedis
- Genus: †Foro; Olson, 1992
- Species: †F. panarium

Binomial name
- †Foro panarium Olson, 1992

= Foro panarium =

Foro panarium Temporal range: Early Eocene (Ypresian-Lutetian)

Extinct genus of birds

Foro panarium is an extinct bird of disputed taxonomic status that lived during the early to mid-Eocene around the Ypresian-Lutetian boundary, some 48 million years ago. F. panarium is known from fossils found in the Green River Formation of Wyoming.

The taxonomical relations of F. panarium remain unclear. It is sometimes placed in a distinct family Foratidae. It was considered possibly related to cuckoos, turacos and/or the puzzling hoatzin of the Amazon. A phylogenetic analysis conducted by Field & Hsiang (2018) indicated that F. panarium was a stem-turaco.

Its scientific name is a Latin / German / English pun in homage to ornithologist Pierce Brodkorb.
