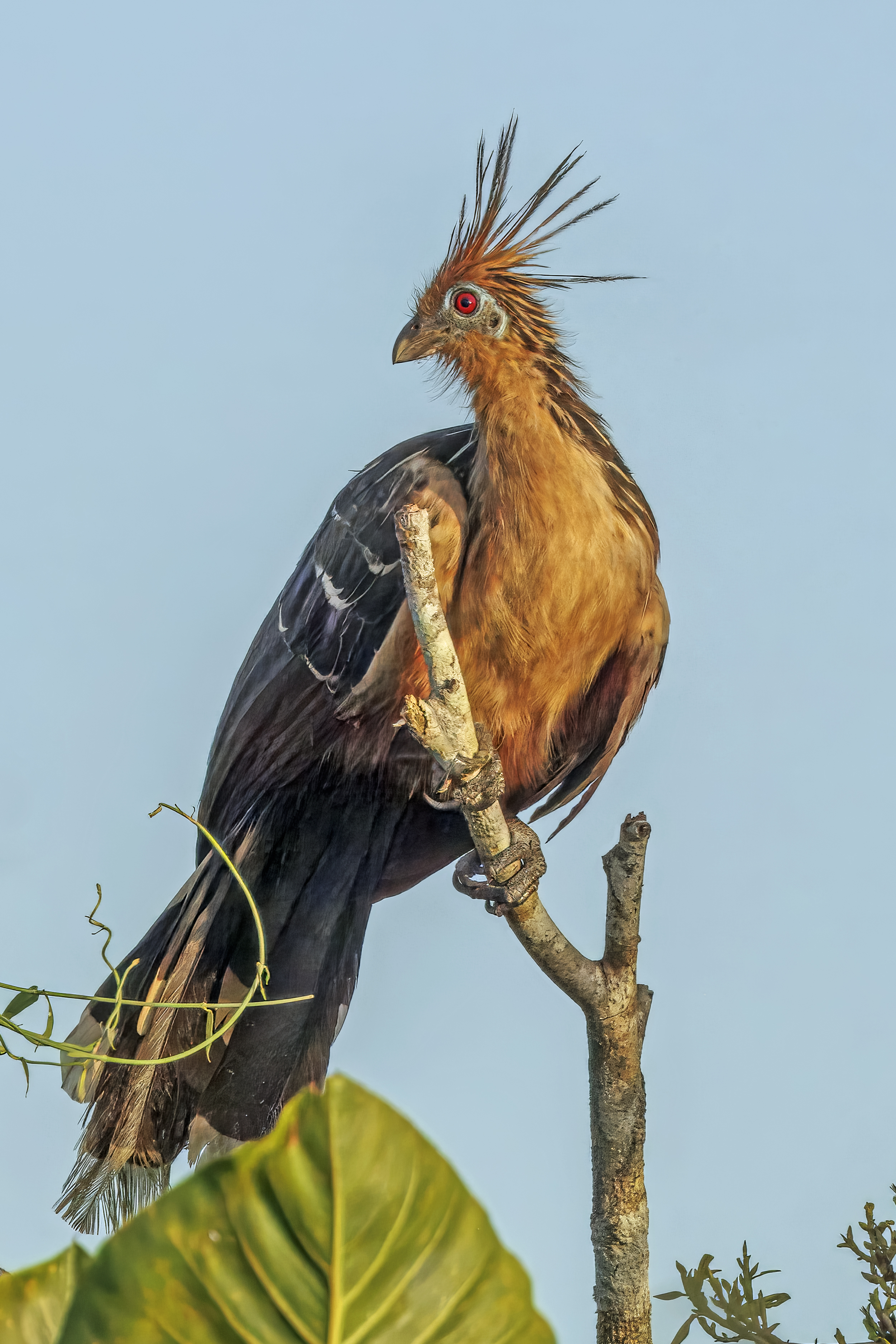
- In Ecuador

Conservation status
- Least Concern (IUCN 3.1)

Scientific classification
- Kingdom: Animalia
- Phylum: Chordata
- Class: Aves
- Order: Opisthocomiformes
- Family: Opisthocomidae
- Genus: Opisthocomus; Illiger, 1811
- Species: O. hoazin

Binomial name
- Opisthocomus hoazin (Müller, 1776)
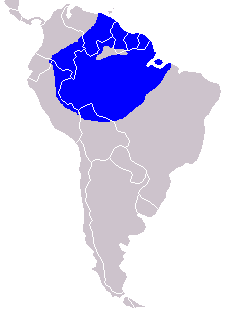
- Range

Synonyms
- Phasianus hoazin Müller, 1776

Audio

= Hoatzin =

Hoatzin Temporal range: Miocene–present

Species of bird in South America

The hoatzin (/ˈwɑːtsɪn, -siːn/ WAHT-sin, -seen; also /ˈhoʊtsɪn/ HO-tsin and /hoʊˈætsɪn/ hoh-AT-sin) (Opisthocomus hoazin) is a species of tropical bird found in swamps, riparian forests, and mangroves of the Amazon and Orinoco Basins in South America. It is the only extant species in the genus Opisthocomus which is the only extant genus in the family Opisthocomidae under the order Opisthocomiformes. Despite being the subject of intense debate by specialists, the taxonomic position of this family is still far from clear.

The hoatzin is notable for its chicks having primitive claws on two of their wing digits. It is unique among birds in possessing a digestive system that significantly supports the fermentation and the effective breakdown of plant matter, a trait more commonly known from herbivorous ungulate-ruminant mammals and some primates. This bird is also the national bird of Guyana, where the local name for this bird is Canje pheasant.

== Description ==
The hoatzin is pheasant-sized, with a total length of 65 cm (26 in), and a long neck and small head. It has an unfeathered, blue face with maroon eyes, and its head is topped by a spiky, rufous crest. The long, sooty-brown tail is bronze-green tipped with a broad, whitish or buff band at the end. The upper parts are dark, sooty brown-edged buff on the wing coverts and streaked buff on the mantle and nape. The underparts are buff, while the crissum (the undertail coverts surrounding the cloaca), primaries, underwing coverts, and flanks are rich rufous-chestnut, but this is mainly visible when the hoatzin opens its wings.

It is a noisy bird, and makes a variety of hoarse calls, including groans, croaks, hisses, and grunts. These calls are often associated with body movements, such as wing spreading.

=== Young wing claws ===
Hoatzin chicks have two claws on each wing. Immediately after hatching, they can use these claws and their oversized feet to scramble around tree branches without falling into the water. When predators such as the great black hawk attack a hoatzin nesting colony, the adults fly noisily about, trying to divert the predator's attention, while the chicks move away from the nest and hide among the thickets. If discovered, however, they drop into the water and swim under the surface to escape, then later use their clawed wings to climb back to the safety of the nest. This has led to comparisons to the fossil bird Archaeopteryx, but the characteristic is rather an autapomorphy, possibly caused by an atavism toward the dinosaurian finger claws, whose developmental genetics ("blueprint") is presumably still present in the avian genome. Furthermore, wing claws are not unique to hoatzins, with chickens also bearing them. Since Archaeopteryx had three functional claws on each wing, some earlier systematists speculated that the hoatzin was descended from it, because nestling hoatzins have two functional claws on each wing. Modern researchers, however, hypothesize that the young hoatzin's claws are of more recent origin, and may be a secondary adaptation from its frequent need to leave the nest and climb about in dense vines and trees well before it can fly. A similar trait is seen in turacos, whose nestlings use claws on their wings to climb in trees.

== Taxonomy, systematics, and evolution ==
The generic name Opisthocomus comes from Ancient Greek ὄπισθοκομος ópisthokomos derived from ὄπισθε ópisthe (ὄπισθεν ópisthen before a consonant) "behind" and κόμη kómē "hair" altogether meaning "long hair behind" referring to its large crest.

The hoatzin was originally described in 1776 by German zoologist Statius Müller. Much debate has occurred about the hoatzin's relationships with other birds. Because of its distinctness, it has been given its own family, the Opisthocomidae, and its own order, the Opisthocomiformes. At various times, it has been allied with such taxa as the tinamous, the Galliformes (gamebirds), the rails, the bustards, seriemas, sandgrouse, doves, turacos and other Cuculiformes, and mousebirds. A whole genome sequencing study published in 2014 places the hoatzin as the sister taxon of a clade composed of Gruiformes (cranes) and Charadriiformes (plovers). Another genomic study in 2024 instead places it as the sister group to the Phaethoquornithes (containing numerous aquatic bird orders). The combined group was found to be sister to the Mirandornithes (flamingos and grebes).

In 2015, genetic research indicated that the hoatzin is the last surviving member of a bird line that branched off in its own direction 64 million years ago, shortly after the extinction event that killed the nonavian dinosaurs. Another genetic study from 2024 instead suggested a Late Cretaceous origin (around 70 million years ago), but found that this early divergence is shared with a majority of extant bird orders, making it no more basal than they are.

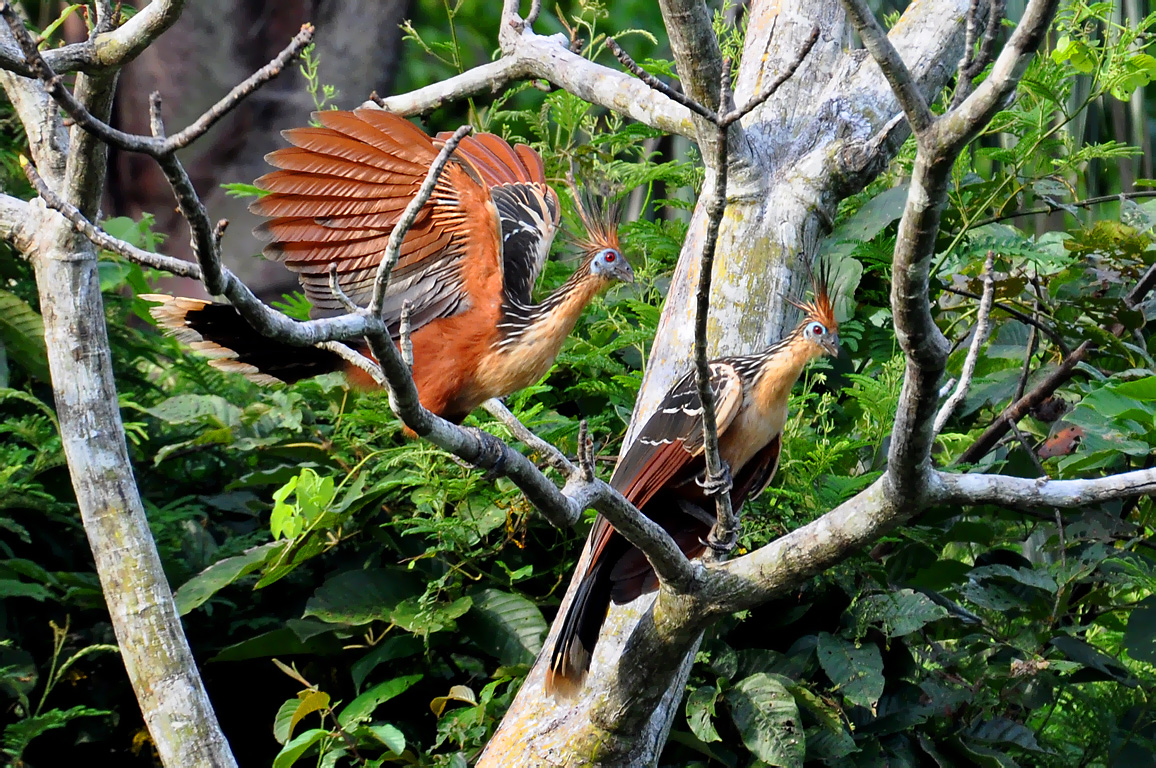
In Brazil

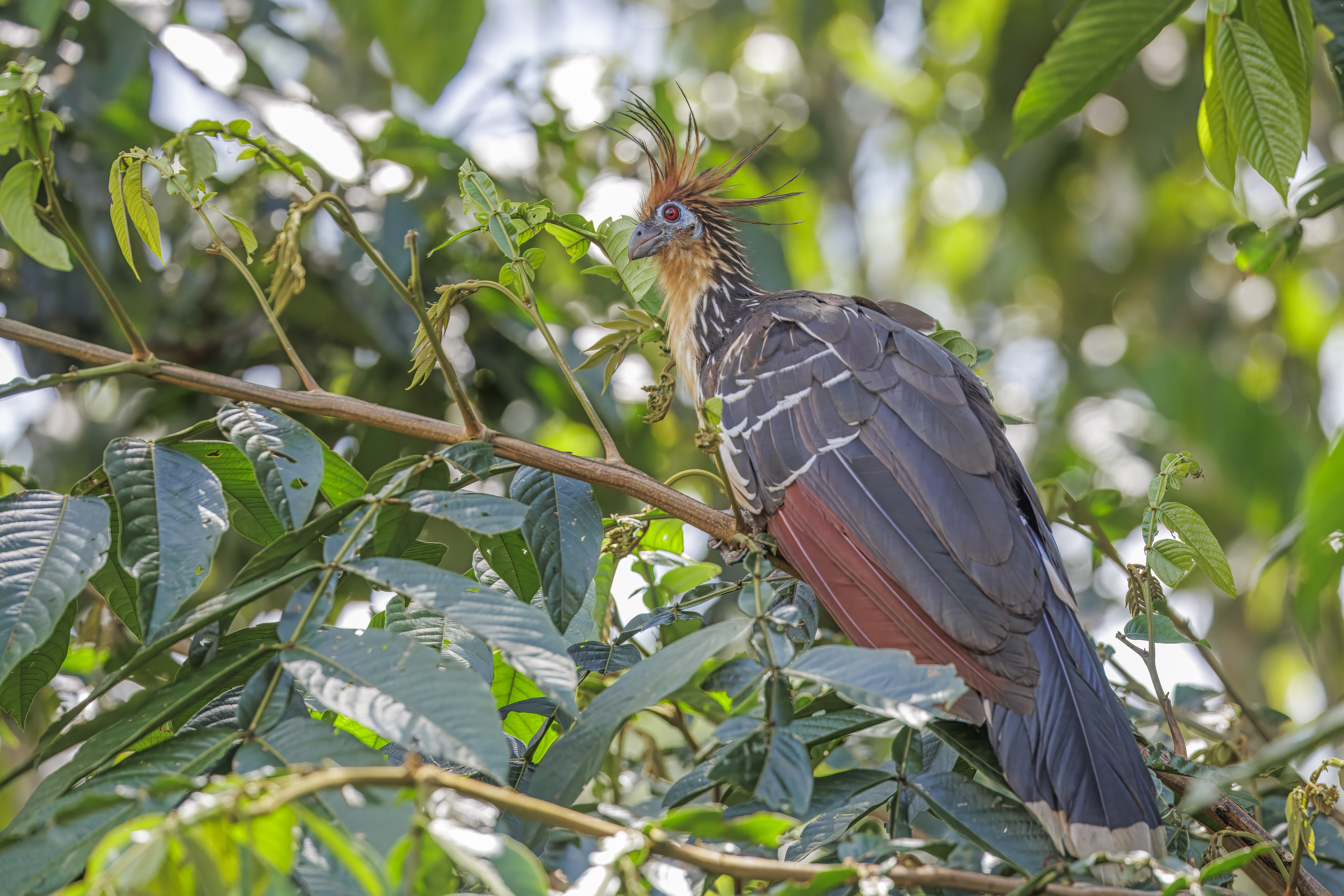
In Ecuador

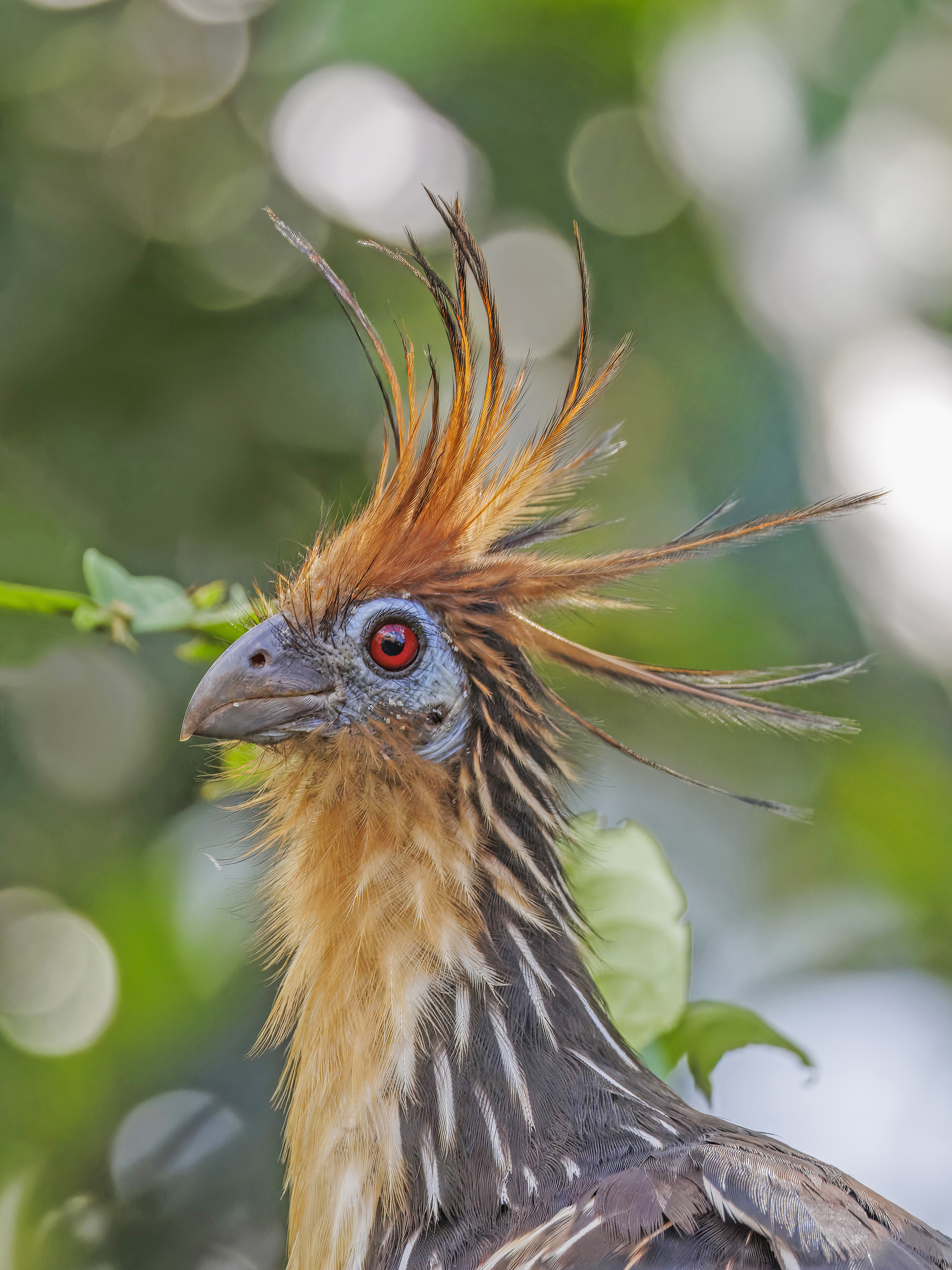
In Ecuador

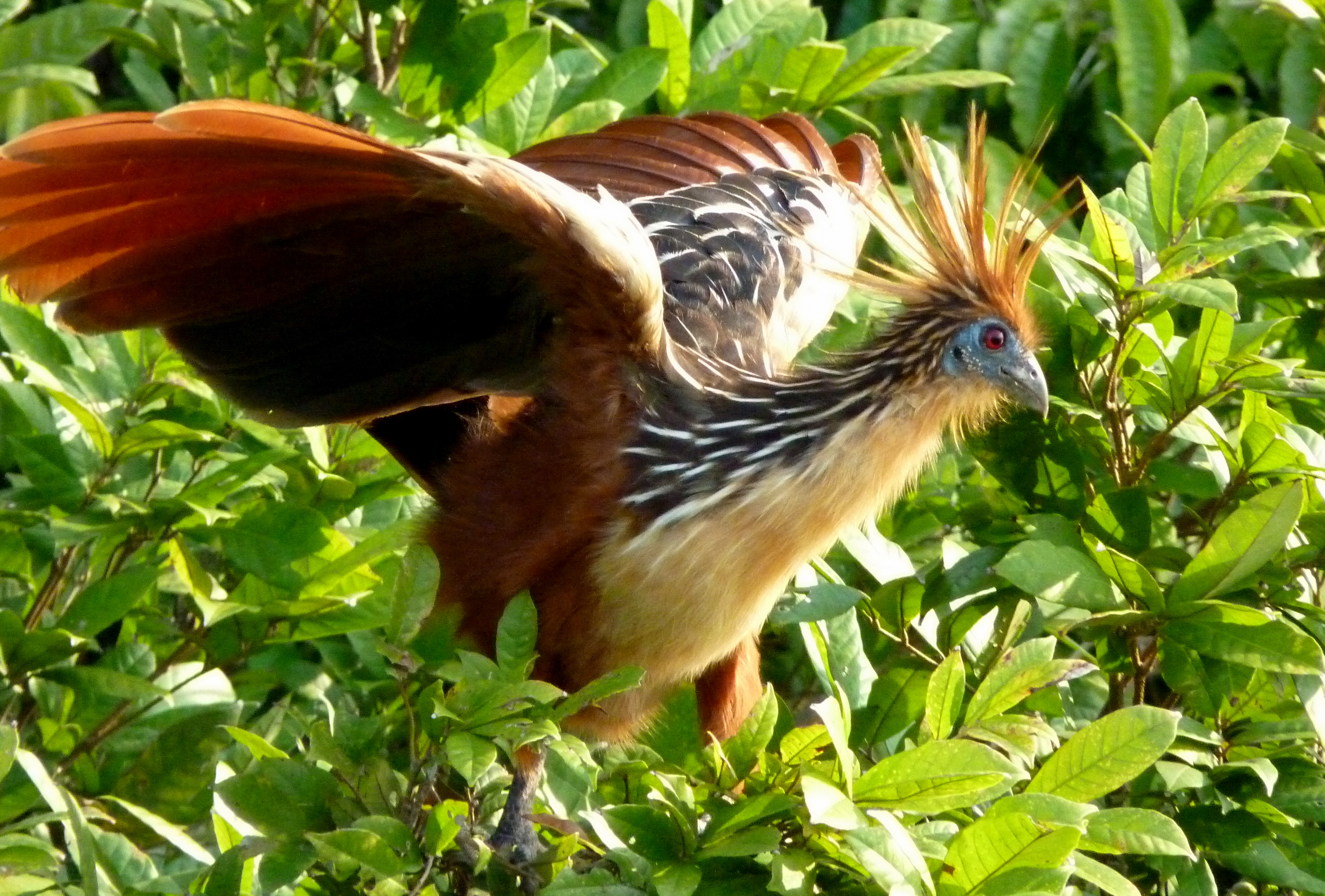
In Peru

=== Fossil record ===
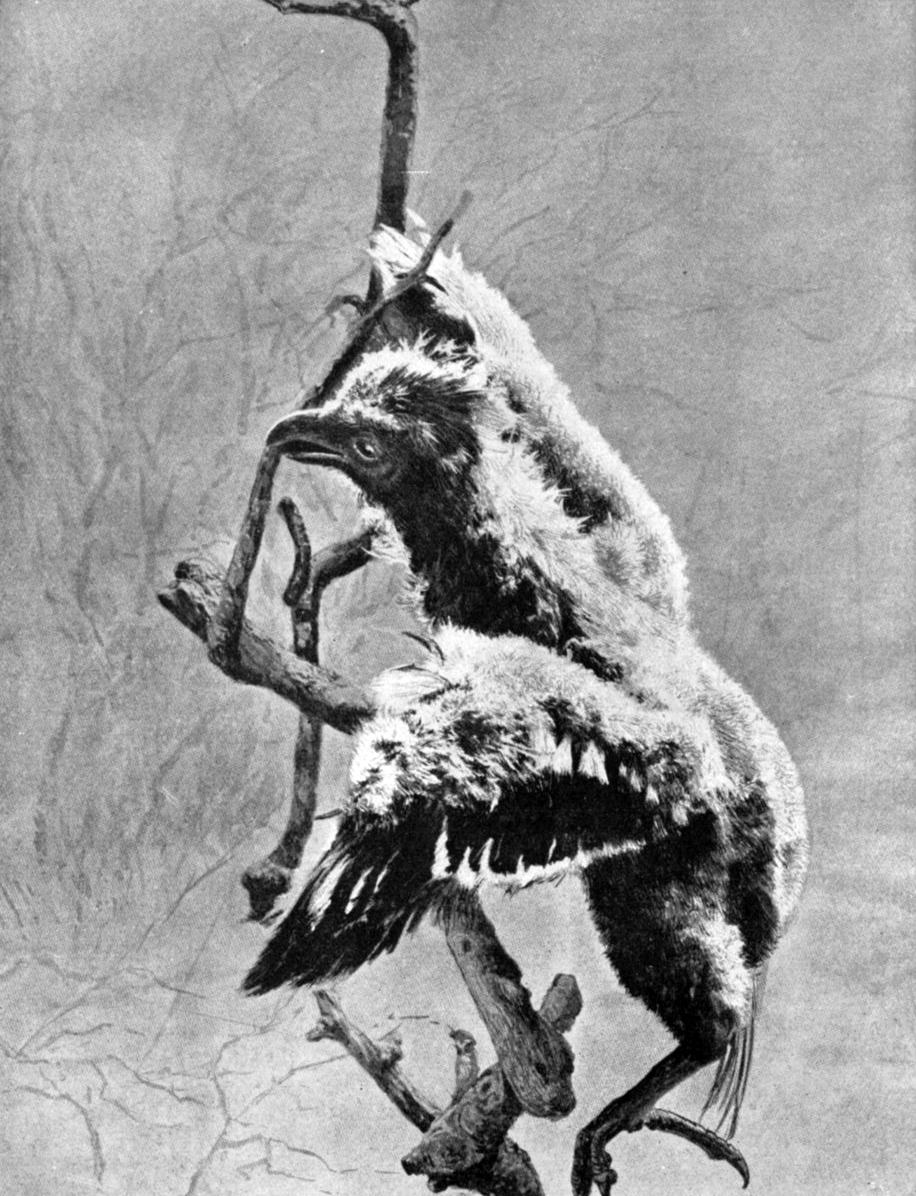
The newly hatched bird has claws on its thumb and first finger, enabling it to dexterously climb tree branches until its wings are strong enough for sustained flight. These claws disappear by the time the bird reaches adulthood.

With respect to other material evidence, an undisputed fossil record of a close hoatzin relative is specimen UCMP 42823, a single cranium backside. It is of Miocene origin (Note: Originally believed to be of Late Miocene age—from some 5–10 million years ago (Mya)—the bone was found in association with fossils of the extinct monkey Cebupithecia sarmientoi that today, usually, is considered to be of the Early or Middle Miocene, possibly 18 but from at least some 12 Mya.) and was recovered in the upper Magdalena River Valley, Colombia, in the well-known fauna of La Venta. This has been placed into a distinct, less derived genus, Hoazinoides, but clearly would be placed into the same family as the extant species. It markedly differs in that the cranium of the living hoatzin is characteristic, being much domed, rounded, and shortened, and that these autapomorphies were less pronounced in the Miocene bird. Müller discussed these findings in the light of the supposed affiliation of the hoatzins and the Galliformes, which was the favored hypothesis at that time, but had been controversial almost since its inception. He cautioned, however, "that Hoazinoides by no means establishes a phyletic junction point with other galliforms" for obvious reasons, as we know today. Anything other than the primary findings of Müller are not to be expected in any case, as by the time of Hoazinoides, essentially all modern bird families are either known or believed to have been present and distinct. Going further back in time, the Late Eocene or Early Oligocene (some 34 Mya) Filholornis from France has also been considered "proof" of a link between the hoatzin and the gamebirds. The fragmentary fossil Onychopteryx from the Eocene of Argentina and the quite complete, but no less enigmatic Early-Middle Eocene (Ypresian-Lutetian, some 48 Mya) Foro panarium are sometimes used to argue for a hoatzin-cuculiform (including turacos) link. As demonstrated above, though, this must be considered highly speculative, if not as badly off the mark as the relationship with the Cracidae discussed by Miller.

The earliest record of the order Opisthocomiformes is Protoazin parisiensis, from the latest Eocene (about 34 Mya) of Romainville, France. The holotype and only known specimen is NMB PG.70, consisting of partial coracoid, partial scapula, and partial pedal phalanx. According to the phylogenetic analysis performed by the authors, Namibiavis, although later, is more basal than Protoazin. Opisthocomiforms seem to have been much more widespread in the past, with the present South American distribution being only a relic. By the Early to Middle Miocene, they were probably extinct in Europe already, as formations dated to this time and representing fluvial or lacustrine palaeoenvironments, in which the hoatzin thrives today, have yielded dozens of bird specimens, but no opisthocomiforms. A possible explanation to account for the extinction of Protoazin between the Late Eocene and the Early Miocene in Europe, and of Namibiavis after the Middle Miocene of sub-Saharan Africa is the arrival of arboreal carnivorans—predation which could have had a devastating effect on the local opisthocomiforms, if they were similarly poor flyers and had a similarly vulnerable nesting strategies as today's hoatzins. Felids and viverrids first arrived in Europe from Asia after the Turgai Sea closed, marking the boundary between the Eocene and the Oligocene. None of these predators, and for the matter, no placental predator at all was present in South America before the Great American Interchange 3 Mya; this absence could explain the survival of the hoatzin there. In addition to being the earliest fossil record of an opisthocomiform, Protoazin was also the earliest find of one (1912), but it was forgotten for more than a century, being described only in 2014.

Hoazinavis is an extinct genus of early opisthocomiforms from Late Oligocene and Early Miocene (about 24–22 Mya) deposits of Brazil. It was collected in 2008 from the Tremembé Formation of São Paulo, Brazil. It was first named by Gerald Mayr, Herculano Alvarenga and Cécile Mourer-Chauviré in 2011 and the type species is Hoazinavis lacustris.

Namibiavis is another extinct genus of early opisthocomiforms from early Middle Miocene (around 16 Mya) deposits of Namibia. It was collected from Arrisdrift, southern Namibia. It was first named by Cécile Mourer-Chauviré in 2003, and the type species is Namibiavis senutae.

== Behavior ==
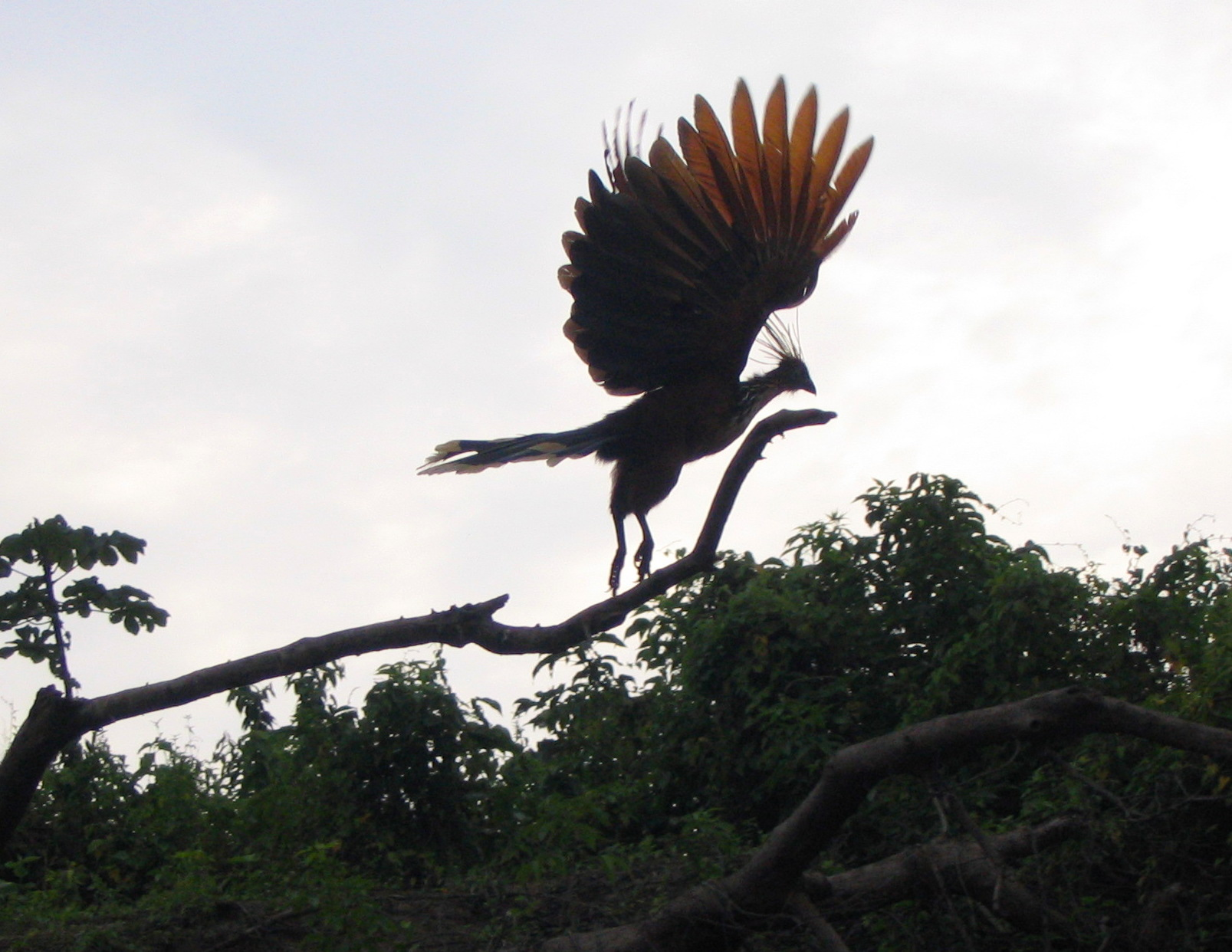
In flight, Bolivia

=== Feeding and habits ===
The hoatzin is a folivore—it eats the leaves (and to a lesser degree, the fruits and flowers) of the plants that grow in its marshy and riverine habitat. It clambers around along the branches in its search for food. The hoatzin uses a leathery "bump" on the bottom of its crop to help balance its weight on the branches. The species was once thought to eat the leaves of only arums and mangroves, but the species is now known to consume the leaves of more than 50 botanical species. One study, undertaken in Venezuela, found that the hoatzin's diet was 82% leaves, 10% flowers, and 8% fruit. Any feeding on insects or other animal matter is purely opportunistic or accidental.

One of this species' many peculiarities is its unique digestive system, which contains specialized bacteria in the front part of the gut that break down and ferment the foliar material they consume (much like cattle and other ruminants do). This process is more efficient than what has been measured in many other species of birds, with up to 70% of the plant fiber being digested. Unlike ruminants, however, which possess a specialized, chambered stomach (rumen, reticulum, omasum, and abomasum for microbial fermentation), the hoatzin has an unusually large crop that is folded into two chambers, with a large, multichambered lower esophagus.

Serrations on the beak help cut leaves into smaller pieces before they are swallowed. Because they lack the teeth of mammals, hoatzins do not chew the cud; instead, a combination of muscular pressure and abrasion by a "cornified" lining of the crop is used as an equivalent to remastication, allowing fermentation and trituration to occur at the same site. The fermented foliage produces methane, which the bird expels through burping. Its stomach chamber and gizzard are much smaller than in other birds. Its crop is so large as to displace the flight muscles and keel of the sternum, much to the detriment of its flight capacity. The crop is supported by a thickened skin callus on the tip of the sternum, which helps the bird support the crop on a branch during rest and while digesting its food. A hoatzin's meal takes up to 45 hours to pass through its body. With a body weight as low as 700 g (1.5 lb), the adult hoatzin is the smallest known animal with foregut fermentation (the lower limit for mammals is about 3 kg (6.6 lb)).

Because of aromatic compounds in the leaves they consume, and the bacterial fermentation required to digest them, the birds have a disagreeable, manure-like odor and are only hunted by humans for food in times of dire need; local people also call it the "stinkbird" because of it. Much of the hoatzin's diet, including various types of Monstera, Philodendron, and other aroids, contains a high concentration of calcium oxalate crystals, which even in small amounts, can be greatly uncomfortable (and even dangerous) for humans to consume.

=== Breeding ===
Hoatzins are seasonal breeders, breeding during the rainy season, the exact timing of which varies across their range. They are gregarious and nest in small colonies, laying two or three eggs in a stick nest in a tree hanging over water in seasonally flooded forests. The chicks are fed on regurgitated, fermented food.

== Relationship with humans ==
In Brazil, indigenous peoples sometimes collect the eggs for food, and the adults are occasionally hunted, but consumption of mature birds is rare, as hoatzin meat is reputed to have a bad taste. Its preferred habitats of forests and inland wetlands are threatened by Amazonian deforestation. The hoatzin is believed to remain fairly common in a large part of its range, but its population is likely decreasing due to habitat loss. The hoatzin is the national bird of Guyana.

== See also ==
- The turaco, a convergently evolved bird in the order Musophagiformes, is a large-crested, arboreal, mainly herbivorous bird whose nestlings also use wing claws for climbing.
