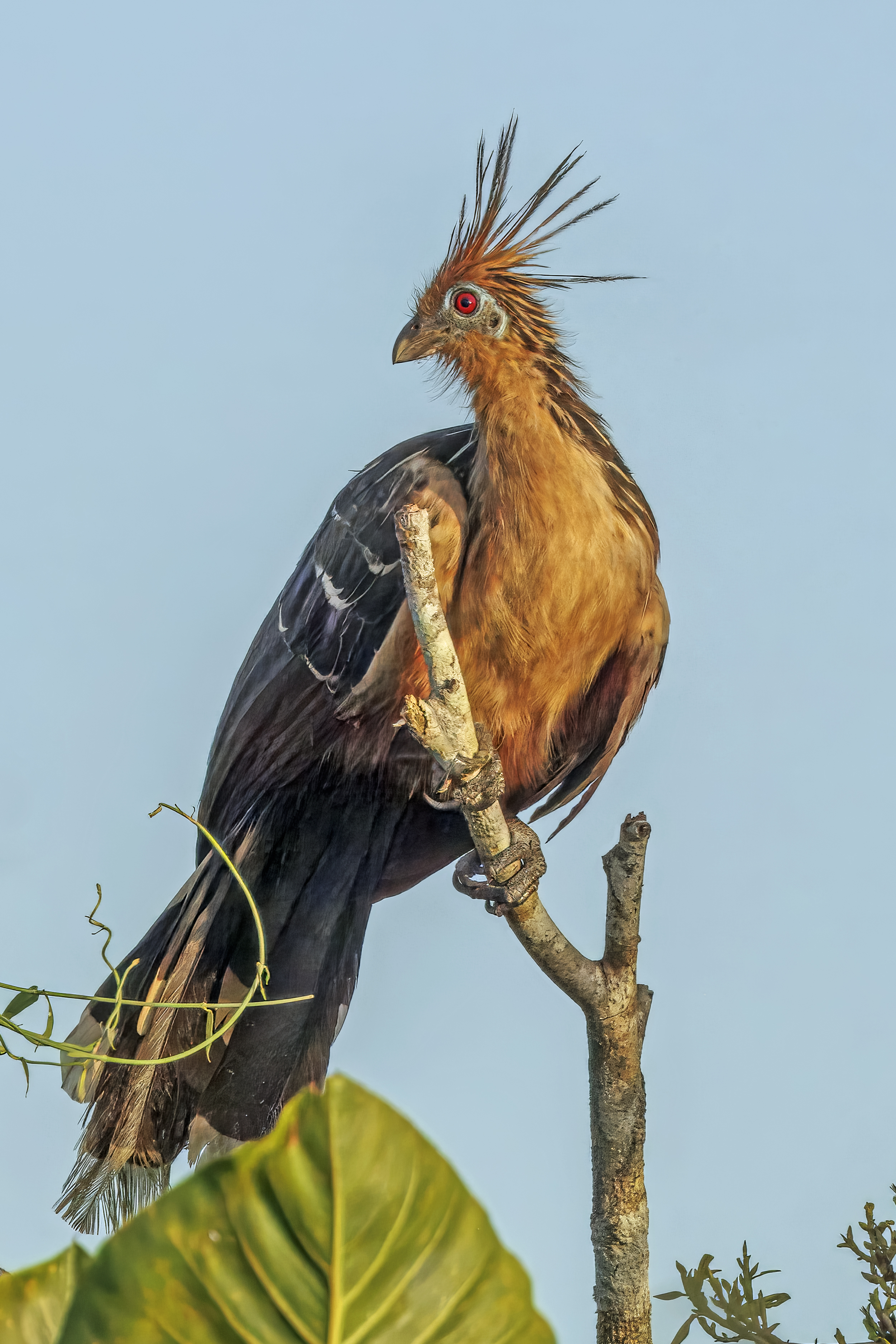
- in Ecuador

Scientific classification
- Kingdom: Animalia
- Phylum: Chordata
- Class: Aves
- (unranked): Gruae
- Order: Opisthocomiformes; L'Herminier, 1837
- Family: Opisthocomidae; Swainson, 1837

Genera
- ?†Foro; ?†Onychopteryx; †Hoazinoides; †Namibiavis; †Protoazin; †Hoazinavis; Opisthocomus

Synonyms
- Foratidae Olson 1992; Hoazinoididae Rasmussen 1997; Onychopterygidae Cracraft 1971

= Opisthocomidae =

Opisthocomids Temporal range: Late Eocene - Recent, 36–0 Ma Possible an early origin based on molecular clock

Family of birds

Opisthocomidae is a family of birds, the only named family within the order Opisthocomiformes. The only living representative is the hoatzin (Opisthocomus hoazin) which lives in the Amazon and the Orinoco delta in South America. Several fossil species have been identified, including one from Africa and one from Europe.

== Phylogeny ==
The phylogeny below is based on the work of Hughes & Baker 1999 and Mayr & De Pietri 2014. Traditionally classified among the fowl-like birds (Galliformes), recent studies have favored Opisthocomidae's placement within the Neoaves.

- - †Namibiavis
  - - †Protoazin
    - - †Hoazinavis
      - Opisthocomus

== Taxonomy ==
- Family Opisthocomidae Swainson 1837
  - Genus ?†Foro Olson 1992 (mid-Eocene, USA) - cuculiform?
    - Species †Foro panarium Olson 1992
  - Genus ?†Onychopteryx Cracraft 1971 (Early Eocene of Argentina) – falconid? A nomen dubium
    - Species †Onychopteryx simpsoni Cracraft 1971
  - Genus †Protoazin Mayr & De Pietri 2014 (late Eocene of France)
    - Species †Protoazin parisiensis Mayr & De Pietri 2014
  - Genus †Namibiavis Mourer-Chauviré 2003 (Middle Miocene of Namibia)
    - Species †Namibiavis senutae Mourer-Chauviré 2003
  - Genus †Hoazinavis Alvarenga, Mayr & Mourer-Chauviré 2011 (Late Oligocene and Early Miocene of Brazil)
    - Species †Hoazinavis lacustris Alvarenga, Mayr & Mourer-Chauviré 2011
  - Genus †Hoazinoides Miller 1953 (middle Miocene of Colombia)
    - Species †Hoazinoides magdalenae Miller 1953
  - Genus Opisthocomus Illiger 1811
    - Species Opisthocomus hoazin (Müller 1776) Illiger 1811 [Phasianus hoazin Müller 1776]

== Description ==
The only living representative is the hoatzin (Opisthocomus hoazin), which lives in the Amazon and the Orinoco delta in South America. Several fossil species have been identified, including one from Africa and one from Europe.

The hoatzin is a stunning, colourful bird from South America. The hoatzin is found in the rainforest of the Amazon. It has a long, permanently erected crest which gives the species a distinctive silhouette. This gregarious species is often found in groups of more than 40 birds, and up to 100 birds during breeding season which occurs during rainfalls. The nest is a flat platform in bush or tree above water. The chicks are semi-precocial and leave the nest at about two to three weeks of age. The adults feed them with semi-digested slimy mass from their crops, and the young are fed during the first four or five months of their life. The young nestlings can jump out into the water, and swim with wings and feet, in order to escape predators at nest. Hoatzin embryos are known to develop very quickly compared to other birds.

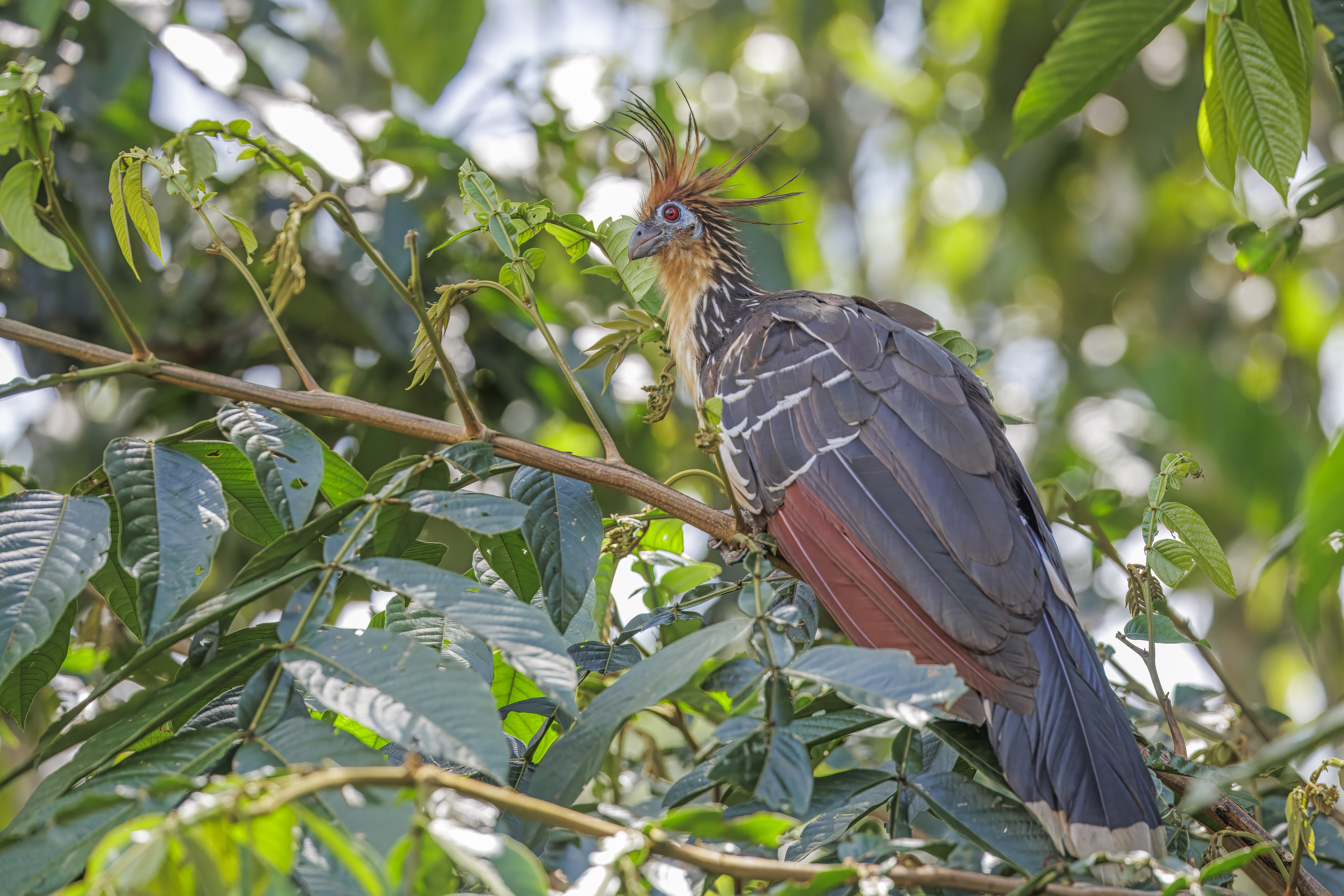

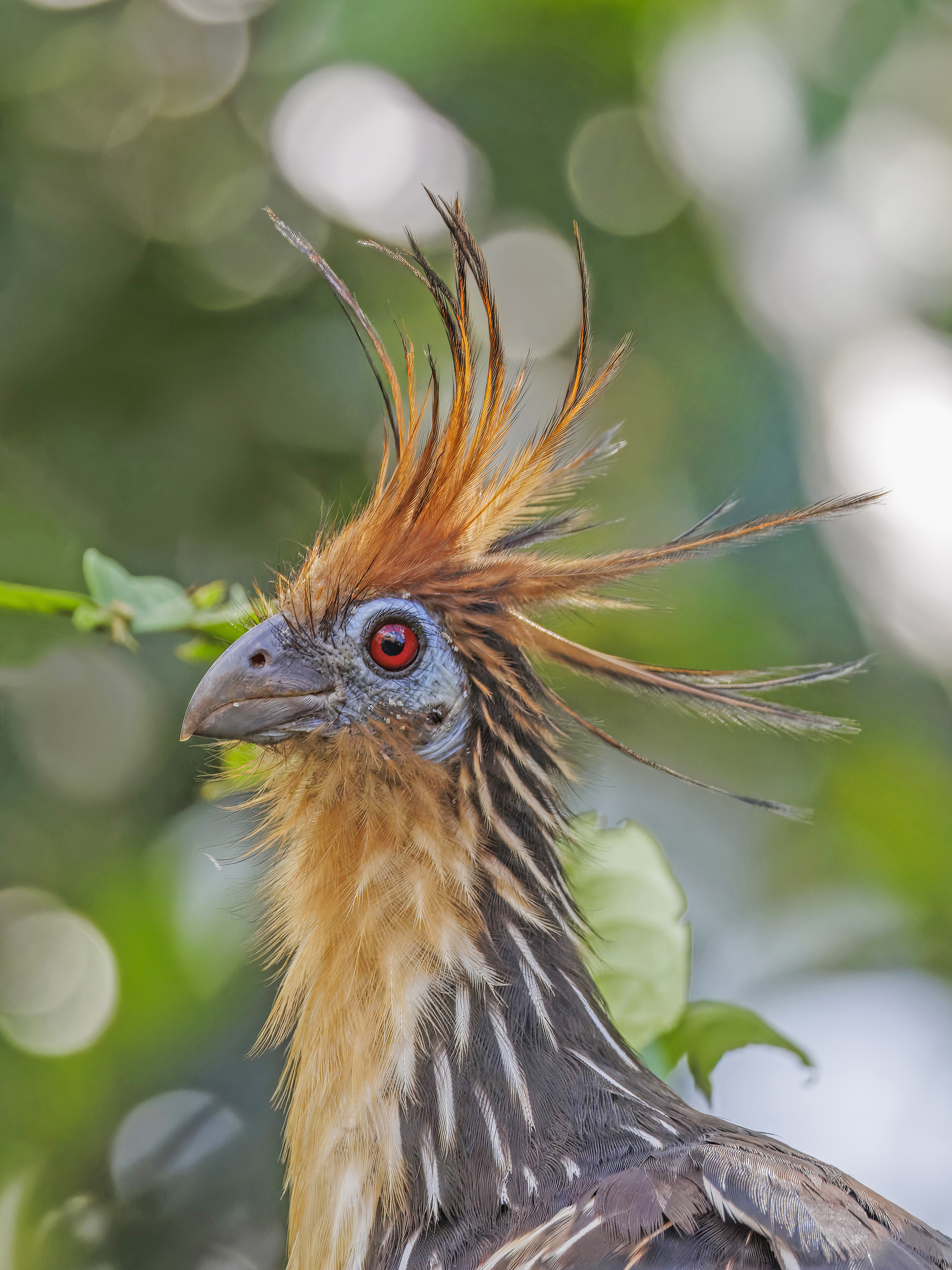

The hoatzin lives in tropical forested wetlands of 200 to 500 meters elevation. The hoatzin is an arboreal species and is folivorous, feeding on leaves, flowers and fruits of a small number of plant species. It has a large crop that uses bacteria to break down the leaves that it eats. The hoatzin is unique because it has bacteria in its crop that breaks down its food while it is still in the crop. This is a process called foregut fermentation. It rarely drinks because its diet is high in water. The hoatzin is sedentary and widespread in suitable habitat. They are noisy birds, calling in unison, uttering large numbers of varied sounds.

In addition to foregut fermentation, the hoatzin has a highly modified skeleton to accommodate its large crop, and in the young of this species, wing claws at the wrist joint which are used to climb among the branches of the nest tree.

== Species by global population ==
Common name	Binomial name	Population	Status	Trend	Notes	Image
Hoatzin	Opisthocomus hoazin	unknown	LC	▼		
