= 2014 in archosaur paleontology =

This article records new taxa of fossil archosaurs of every kind that are scheduled described during the year 2014, as well as other significant discoveries and events related to paleontology of archosaurs that are scheduled to occur in the year 2014.

== Pseudosuchians ==
=== Research ===
- A study of anatomy and phylogenetic relationships of Gracilisuchus stipanicicorum, Turfanosuchus dabanensis and Yonghesuchus sangbiensis is published by Butler et al. (2014).
- A study on the impact of sea level variations and sea surface temperatures on the evolution of marine crocodylomorphs is published by Martin et al. (2014).
- A study of jaw mechanism and dental function in heterodont crocodyliforms is published by Ősi (2014).
- A study on the types of serration in the teeth of members of the genus Machimosaurus is published by Young et al. (2014).
- The atoposaurid crocodyliform genus Alligatorellus is revised by Tennant and Mannion (2014).

=== New taxa ===
Name	Novelty	Status	Authors	Age	Unit	Location	Notes	Images
Allodaposuchus palustris	Sp. nov	Valid	Blanco et al.	Late Cretaceous (early Maastrichtian)	Tremp Formation	Spain	A eusuchian crocodylomorph, a species of Allodaposuchus.	
Anthracosuchus	Gen. et sp. nov	Valid	Hastings, Bloch & Jaramillo	Paleocene	Cerrejón Formation	Colombia	A dyrosaurid crocodyliform. The type species is Anthracosuchus balrogus.	
Aplestosuchus	Gen. et sp. nov	Valid	Godoy et al.	Late Cretaceous	Adamantina Formation	Brazil	A baurusuchid crocodylomorph. The type species is Aplestosuchus sordidus.	
Caipirasuchus stenognathus	Sp. nov	Valid	Pol et al.	Late Cretaceous	Adamantina Formation	Brazil	A sphagesaurid crocodylomorph, a species of Caipirasuchus.	
Diplocynodon remensis	Sp. nov	Valid	Martin et al.	Late Paleocene		France	A member of Alligatoroidea, a species of Diplocynodon.	
Machimosaurus buffetauti	Sp. nov	Valid	Young et al.	Late Jurassic (Kimmeridgian)		France; Germany; Poland? United Kingdom?	A teleosaurid crocodylomorph, a species of Machimosaurus. Considered to be a junior synonym of Machimosaurus hugii by Martin, Vincent & Falconnet (2015).	
Nundasuchus	Gen. et sp. nov	Valid	Nesbitt et al.	Middle Triassic (Anisian)	Manda Beds	Tanzania	A member of Archosauriformes of uncertain phylogenetic placement, possibly a pseudosuchian. The type species is Nundasuchus songeaensis.	
Polesinesuchus	Gen. et sp. nov	Disputed	Roberto-da-Silva et al.	Late Triassic	Santa Maria Formation	Brazil	An aetosaur. The type species is Polesinesuchus aurelioi. Paes-Neto et al. (2021) proposed that P. aurelioi is a junior synonym of Aetosauroides scagliai.	
Rukwasuchus	Gen. et sp. nov	Valid	Sertich & O'Connor	Cretaceous (Aptian to Cenomanian)	Galula Formation	Tanzania	A peirosaurid crocodyliform. The type species is Rukwasuchus yajabalijekundu.	
Sahitisuchus	Gen. et sp. nov	Valid	Kellner, Pinheiro & Campos	Paleocene (Itaboraian)	Itaboraí Formation	Brazil	A sebecid crocodylomorph. The type species is Sahitisuchus fluminensis.	
Wannchampsus	Gen. et sp. nov	Valid	Adams	Early Cretaceous (late Aptian)	Twin Mountains Formation	United States	A paralligatorid neosuchian crocodylomorph. The type species is Wannchampsus kirpachi.	

== Non-avian dinosaurs ==
=== Research ===
- A study on the patterns of body size evolution in dinosaurs is published by Benson et al. (2014).
- A study of size changes and rates of anatomical innovation in the theropod lineage ancestral to birds is published by Lee et al. (2014).
- A study of evolution of body size and forelimb length in birds and nov-avian coelurosaurian theropods is published by Puttick, Thomas and Benton (2014).
- A phylogenetic analysis of bird and non-avian coelurosaurian theropod relationships and a study of rates of morphological evolution and changes in morphological disparity across the dinosaur-bird transition is published by Brusatte et al. (2014).
- A description of abelisaurid teeth from the Late Jurassic Lourinhã Formation of Portugal and a phylogenetic analysis of theropod relationships based on dental characters is published by Hendrickx and Mateus (2014).
- A study of theropod diversity in the Cretaceous (Aptian-Albian) of Tunisia is published by Fanti et al. (2014).
- A juvenile specimen of Megaraptor namunhuaiquii is described by Porfiri et al. (2014).
- A study of European fossil record of Ornithomimosauria is published by Allain et al. (2014).
- A study on the morphological variability and function of manual claws in theropod dinosaurs, especially in therizinosaurs, is published by Lautenschlager (2014).
- A study of flight ability in some non-avian paravian theropods is published by Sorkin (2014).
- "Saurornitholestes" robustus, initially thought to be a dromaeosaurid, is reinterpreted as a troodontid by Evans et al. (2014).
- A well-preserved specimen of Microraptor zhaoianus is described by Pei et al. (2014).
- A study of anatomy and phylogenetic relationships of Antetonitrus ingenipes is published by McPhee et al. (2014).
- A study on the differences in skull anatomy of Diplodocus and Camarasaurus, and on their implications for inferring possible niche partitioning between Late Jurassic sauropod taxa known from the Morrison Formation, is published by Button, Rayfield & Barrett (2014).
- Fragmentary partial skeleton of a small sauropod belonging to the genus Haplocanthosaurus collected from the Rocky Mountains of central Colorado is described by Foster & Wedel (2014).
- The purported size of the holotype vertebra of Amphicoelias fragillimus is reevaluated by Woodruff and Foster (2014).
- A study of phylogenetic relationships of Lourinhasaurus alenquerensis is published by Mocho, Royo-Torres and Ortega (2014).
- A study of anatomy and phylogenetic relationships of Aragosaurus ischiaticus is published by Royo-Torres et al. (2014).
- A study of titanosaur osteoderms from the Upper Cretaceous Lo Hueco site in Cuenca, Spain is published by Vidal, Ortega and Sanz (2014).
- A study of species richness of South American titanosaur assemblages during the Late Cretaceous is published by Vieira et al. (2014).
- A study of the effect of intervertebral cartilage on neck posture of sauropod dinosaurs is published by Taylor (2014).
- A study of the dentition of Manidens condorensis is published by Becerra et al. (2014).
- A study of the postcranial anatomy of Heterodontosaurus tucki is published by Galton (2014).
- A study of the impact of osteoderm placement on the centre of mass of stegosaurs is published by Mallison (2014).
- A study of Early Cretaceous Spanish iguanodont ornithopod diversity and a description of new remains referrable to Delapparentia is published by Gasca, Canudo and Moreno-Azanza (2014).
- A specimen of Edmontosaurus regalis with remains of a soft-tissue cranial crest is described by Bell et al. (2014).
- A juvenile specimen of Edmontosaurus annectens is described by Prieto-Márquez (2014).
- An assemblage of Psittacosaurus juveniles associated with a larger specimen from the Lujiatun beds of the Yixian Formation in Liaoning, China is described by Hedrick et al. (2014).
- An aggregation of four juveniles of Protoceratops andrewsi from the Tugrikin Shire locality of the Djadokhta Formation in Central Gobi region, Mongolia and two associated subadults of the same species from the same locality are described by Hone et al. (2014).
- A study of ontogenetic changes in the craniofacial skeleton of Centrosaurus apertus is published by Frederickson and Tumarkin-Deratzian (2014).
- A new specimen attributable to Arrhinoceratops brachyops is described by Mallon et al. (2014).
- A study on the evolution of species belonging to the genus Triceratops, as indicated by their morphological variation and stratigraphic data from the Hell Creek Formation (Montana, United States), is published by Scannella et al. (2014).
- A new specimen of Spinosaurus is described by Ibrahim et al., with a controversial reconstruction of Spinosaurus as a quadrupedal semi-aquatic genus.
- Two new specimens of the previous enigma Deinocheirus are described and analysed by Lee et al. (2014).
- A tiny theropod was found in the South Korea. (2014)

=== New taxa ===
Name	Novelty	Status	Authors	Age	Unit	Location	Notes	Images
Adelolophus	Gen. et sp. nov	Valid	Gates et al.	Late Cretaceous (Campanian)	Wahweap Formation	United States	A lambeosaurine hadrosaurid. The type species is Adelolophus hutchisoni.	
Allosaurus lucasi	Sp. nov	Disputed	Dalman	Late Jurassic (Tithonian)	Morrison Formation	United States	An allosauroid theropod, a species of Allosaurus. Study in 2020 considered this species invalid.	
Amargastegos	Gen. et sp. nov	Disputed	Ulansky	Early Cretaceous (Barremian-early Aptian)	La Amarga Formation	Argentina	A stegosaur. The type species is Amargastegos brevicollus. According to Galton and Carpenter (2016) it did not meet the requirements of the International Code of Zoological Nomenclature.	
Andhrasaurus	Gen. et. sp. nov	Disputed	Ulansky	Early Jurassic (Pliensbachian-Toarcian)	Kota Formation	India	A basal thyreophoran. The type species is Andhrasaurus indicus. According to Galton and Carpenter (2016) it did not meet the requirements of the International Code of Zoological Nomenclature.	
Anzu	Gen. et sp. nov	Valid	Lamanna et al.	Late Cretaceous (late Maastrichtian)	Hell Creek Formation	United States	A caenagnathid theropod. The type species is Anzu wyliei.	
Aquilops	Gen. et sp. nov	Valid	Farke et al.	Early Cretaceous (Albian)	Cloverly Formation	United States	A basal member of Neoceratopsia. The type species is Aquilops americanus.	
Arcovenator	Gen. et sp. nov	Valid	Tortosa et al.	Late Cretaceous (late Campanian)		France	An abelisaurid theropod. The type species is Arcovenator escotae.	
Camarillasaurus	Gen. et sp. nov	Valid	Sánchez-Hernández & Benton	Early Cretaceous (early Barremian)	Camarillas Formation	Spain	A theropod dinosaur; originally described as a basal ceratosaurian, but subsequently reinterpreted as a spinosaurid. The type species is Camarillasaurus cirugedae.	
Changyuraptor	Gen. et sp. nov	Valid	Han et al.	Early Cretaceous	Yixian Formation	China	A microraptorine dromaeosaurid theropod. The type species is Changyuraptor yangi.	
Chuanqilong	Gen. et sp. nov	Valid	Han et al.	Early Cretaceous (Aptian)	Jiufotang Formation	China	An ankylosaurid. The type species is Chuanqilong chaoyangensis.	
Chungkingosaurus giganticus	Sp. nov	Disputed	Ulansky	Late Jurassic (Oxfordian)	Shangshaximiao Formation	China	A huayangosaurid, a species of Chungkingosaurus. According to Galton and Carpenter (2016) it did not meet the requirements of the International Code of Zoological Nomenclature.	
Chungkingosaurus magnus	Sp. nov	Disputed	Ulansky	Late Jurassic (Oxfordian)	Shangshaximiao Formation	China	A huayangosaurid, a species of Chungkingosaurus. According to Galton and Carpenter (2016) it did not meet the requirements of the International Code of Zoological Nomenclature.	
Datanglong	Gen. et sp. nov	Valid	Mo et al.	Early Cretaceous	Xinlong Formation	China	A carcharodontosaur theropod. The type species is Datanglong guangxiensis.	
Dreadnoughtus	Gen. et sp. nov	Valid	Lacovara et al.	Late Cretaceous (Campanian or Maastrichtian)	Cerro Fortaleza Formation	Argentina	A titanosaurian sauropod. The type species is Dreadnoughtus schrani.	
Eoplophysis	Gen. et comb. nov	Disputed	Ulansky	Middle Jurassic (Bathonian)	Cornbrash Formation	England	A stegosaur; a new genus for "Omosaurus" vetustus von Huene (1910). According to Galton and Carpenter (2016) it did not meet the requirements of the International Code of Zoological Nomenclature.	
Eousdryosaurus	Gen. et sp. nov	Valid	Escaso et al.	Late Jurassic	Alcobaça Formation	Portugal	A dryosaurid ornithopod. The type species is Eousdryosaurus nanohallucis.	
Ferganastegos	Gen. et sp. nov	Disputed	Ulansky	Middle Jurassic (Callovian)	Balabansai Formation	Kyrgyzstan	A stegosaur. According to Galton and Carpenter (2016) it did not meet the requirements of the International Code of Zoological Nomenclature.	
Fosterovenator	Gen. et sp. nov	Valid	Dalman	Late Jurassic (Kimmeridgian/Tithonian)	Morrison Formation	United States	A theropod dinosaur. The type species is Fosterovenator churei.	
Gobivenator	Gen. et sp. nov	Valid	Tsuihiji et al.	Late Cretaceous (Campanian)	Djadochta Formation	Mongolia	A troodontid theropod. The type species is Gobivenator mongoliensis.	
Gongpoquansaurus	Gen. et comb. nov	Valid	You, Li & Dodson	Early Cretaceous (Albian)	Zhonggou Formation	China	A non-hadrosaurid hadrosauroid; a new genus for "Probactrosaurus" mazongshanensis Lü (1997).	
Huangshanlong	Gen. et sp. nov	Valid	Huang et al.	Middle Jurassic	Hongqin Formation	China	A mamenchisaurid sauropod. The type species is Huangshanlong anhuiensis.	
Kulindadromeus	Gen. et sp. nov	Valid	Godefroit et al.	Middle or Late Jurassic (Bajocian to Tithonian)	Ukureyskaya Formation	Russia	A non-cerapodan neornithischian. The type species is Kulindadromeus zabaikalicus.	
Laquintasaura	Gen. et sp. nov	Valid	Barrett et al.	Early Jurassic	La Quinta Formation	Venezuela	A basal ornithischian. The type species is Laquintasaura venezuelae.	
Leinkupal	Gen. et sp. nov	Valid	Gallina et al.	Early Cretaceous (late Berriasian to Valanginian)	Bajada Colorada Formation	Argentina	A diplodocine diplodocid sauropod. The type species is Leinkupal laticauda.	
Mercuriceratops	Gen. et sp. nov	Valid	Ryan et al.	Late Cretaceous (Campanian)	Dinosaur Park Formation; Judith River Formation	Canada; United States	A chasmosaurine ceratopsid. The type species is Mercuriceratops gemini.	
Nanuqsaurus	Gen. et sp. nov	Valid	Fiorillo & Tykoski	Late Cretaceous (Maastrichtian)	Prince Creek Formation	United States	A tyrannosaurid theropod. The type species is Nanuqsaurus hoglundi.	
Natronasaurus	Gen. et comb. nov	Disputed	Ulansky	Late Jurassic (Kimmeridgian-Tithonian)	Morrison Formation	United States	A stegosaurid; a new genus for "Stegosaurus" longispinus Gilmore (1914). According to Galton and Carpenter (2016) it did not meet the requirements of the International Code of Zoological Nomenclature; Galton and Carpenter made "S." longispinus the type species of a new genus Alcovasaurus.	
Panguraptor	Gen. et sp. nov	Valid	You et al.	Early Jurassic	Lufeng Formation	China	A coelophysoid theropod. The type species is Panguraptor lufengensis.	
Pentaceratops aquilonius	Sp. nov	Valid	Longrich	Late Cretaceous (late Campanian)	Dinosaur Park Formation	Canada	A ceratopsid, a species of Pentaceratops.	
Plesiohadros	Gen. et sp. nov	Valid	Tsogtbaatar et al.	Late Cretaceous (probably late Campanian)	Djadochta Formation Beds of Alag Teeg	Mongolia	A non-hadrosaurid hadrosauroid. The type species is Plesiohadros djadokhtaensis.	
Qianzhousaurus	Gen. et sp. nov	Valid	Lü et al.	Late Cretaceous (Maastrichtian)	Nanxiong Formation	China	A tyrannosaurid theropod. The type species is Qianzhousaurus sinensis.	
Quetecsaurus	Gen. et sp. nov	Valid	González Riga & Ortiz David	Late Cretaceous (Turonian)	Cerro Lisandro Formation	Argentina	A titanosaur sauropod related to Mendozasaurus and Futalognkosaurus. The type species is Quetecsaurus rusconii.	
Rhinorex	Gen. et sp. nov	Valid	Gates & Scheetz	Late Cretaceous (Campanian)	Neslen Formation	United States	A saurolophine hadrosaurid. The type species is Rhinorex condrupus.	Rhinorex
Rukwatitan	Gen. et sp. nov	Valid	Gorscak et al.	Cretaceous (Aptian to Cenomanian)	Galula Formation	Tanzania	A titanosaur sauropod. The type species is Rukwatitan bisepultus.	Rukwatitan
Saldamosaurus	Gen. et sp. nov	Disputed	Ulansky	Late Jurassic	Saldam Formation	Russia	A stegosaur. The type species is Saldamosaurus tuvensis. According to Galton and Carpenter (2016) it did not meet the requirements of the International Code of Zoological Nomenclature.	
Scelidosaurus arizonensis	Sp. nov	Disputed	Ulansky	Early Jurassic (?Sinemurian-Pliensbachian)	Kayenta Formation	United States	A basal thyreophoran, a species of Scelidosaurus. According to Galton and Carpenter (2016) it did not meet the requirements of the International Code of Zoological Nomenclature.	
Siamodracon	Gen. et sp. nov	Disputed	Ulansky	Late Jurassic	Phu Kradung Formation	Thailand	A stegosaur. The type species is Siamodracon altispinus. According to Galton and Carpenter (2016) it did not meet the requirements of the International Code of Zoological Nomenclature.	
Sinopeltosaurus	Gen. et sp. nov	Disputed	Ulansky	Early Jurassic (Hettangian-Pliensbachian)	Lufeng Formation	China	A basal thyreophoran. The type species is Sinopeltosaurus minimus. According to Galton and Carpenter (2016) it did not meet the requirements of the International Code of Zoological Nomenclature.	
Tachiraptor	Gen. et sp. nov	Valid	Langer et al.	Earliest Jurassic	La Quinta Formation	Venezuela	A stem-averostran theropod. The type species is Tachiraptor admirabilis.	
Tambatitanis	Gen. et sp. nov	Valid	Saegusa and Ikeda	Early Cretaceous (probably early Albian)	Ohyamashimo Formation	Japan	A titanosauriform sauropod, a member of Somphospondyli. The type species is Tambatitanis amicitiae.	
Torvosaurus gurneyi	Sp. nov	Valid	Hendrickx & Mateus	Late Jurassic (late Kimmeridgian)	Lourinhã Formation	Portugal	A megalosauroid theropod, a species of Torvosaurus.	Torvosaurus
Vahiny	Gen. et sp. nov	Valid	Curry Rogers & Wilson	Late Cretaceous	Maevarano Formation	Madagascar	A titanosaur sauropod. The type species is Vahiny depereti.	
Wuerhosaurus mongoliensis	Sp. nov.	Disputed	Ulansky	Early Cretaceous (Aptian-Albian)	Khukhtyk Formation	Mongolia	A stegosaur, a species of Wuerhosaurus. According to Galton and Carpenter (2016) it did not meet the requirements of the International Code of Zoological Nomenclature.	
Yongjinglong	Gen. et sp. nov	Valid	Li et al.	Early Cretaceous	Hekou Group	China	A titanosaur sauropod. The type species is Yongjinglong datangi.	
Zaraapelta	Gen. et sp. nov	Valid	Arbour, Currie & Badamgarav	Late Cretaceous	Barun Goyot Formation	Mongolia	A member of Ankylosauridae. The type species is Zaraapelta nomadis.	
Zby	Gen. et sp. nov	Valid	Mateus, Mannion & Upchurch	Late Jurassic (late Kimmeridgian)	Lourinhã Formation	Portugal	A turiasaurian sauropod. The type species is Zby atlanticus.	Zby
Zhanghenglong	Gen. et sp. nov	Valid	Xing et al.	Late Cretaceous (Santonian)	Majiacun Formation	China	A non-hadrosaurid hadrosauroid ornithopod. The type species is Zhanghenglong yangchengensis.	Zhanghenglong
Ziapelta	Gen. et sp. nov	Valid	Arbour et al.	Late Cretaceous (late Campanian)	Kirtland Formation	United States	An ankylosaurid. The type species is Ziapelta sanjuanensis.	Ziapelta

== Birds ==
=== Research ===
- A study on the antiquity of birds is published by Lee et al. (2014).
- A new specimen of Archaeopteryx is described by Foth, Tischlinger and Rauhut (2014).
- Zhongornis haoae, initially thought to be a bird, is argued to be a non-avian maniraptoran by O'Connor and Sullivan (2014).
- A study of ecological disparity in Early Cretaceous birds is published by Mitchell and Makovicky (2014).
- A subadult specimen of Zhouornis hani is described by Zhang et al. (2014).
- New specimen of Hongshanornis longicresta, providing new information on the anatomy, trophic ecology and aerodynamics of this species is described from the Lower Cretaceous Yixian Formation (China) by Chiappe et al. (2014).
- A study of the species status of the moa from the genus Euryapteryx is published by Huynen and Lambert (2014).
- A study of growth in the moa from the genus Euryapteryx is published by Huynen et al. (2014).
- A study of tbx5 gene of the moa from the genus Dinornis is published by Huynen et al. (2014).
- New samples of Miocene ratite eggs are described from Namibia by Pickford (2014), who names new ootaxa Tsondabornis psammoides, Tsondabornis minor and Namornis elimensis.
- Fossil remains of a relative of the hoatzin, possibly a species belonging to the genus Namibiavis, from the middle Miocene of Kenya, are described by Mayr (2014).
- A specimen of Pumiliornis tessellatus with preserved stomach contents including pollen grains is described by Mayr and Wilde (2014).
- A Late Pleistocene specimen of griffon vulture (Gyps fulvus) with exceptionally well preserved fossilized soft tissues is described from the Alban Hills volcanic region, Italy by Iurino et al. (2014).

=== New taxa ===
Name	Novelty	Status	Authors	Age	Unit	Location	Notes	Images
Aegypius varswaterensis	Sp nov.	Valid	Albrecht Manegold, Marco Pavia, Pippa Haarhoff	Early Pliocene	Varswater Formation	South Africa	An Aegypius sp. related to the cinereous vulture	
Anser djuktaiensis	Sp nov.	Valid	Zelenkov & Kurochkin	Late Pleistocene		Russia	A species of Anser.	
Australornis lovei	Gen. et Sp. nov.	Valid	Mayr & R. Paul Scofield	Early Paleocene	Waipara Greensand	New Zealand	An incertae sedis Neognathae, Monotypic with A. lovei.	
Bambolinetta lignitifila	Gen. et Comb. nov.	Valid	Mayr & Pavia	Miocene		Italy	An Anatinae genus, Comb. nov. for "Anas" lignitifila	
Baselrallus intermedius	Gen. et Sp. nov.	Valid	De Pietri, Gerald Mayr	Early Miocene		France	A member of the Rallidae. The type species of the new genus.	
Caracara seymouri	Sp. nov.	Valid	Suarez & Olson	Quaternary	La Carolina; Talara Tar Seeps	Ecuador; Peru	A Caracara, Falconidae.	
Cryptopsar ischyrhynchus	Gen. et Sp. nov.	Valid	Hume	Holocene		Mauritius	A member of the Sturnidae, it is the type species of the new genus.	
Eopengornis martini	Gen. et Sp. nov.	Valid	Wang, O'Connor, Zheng, Wang, Hu, Zhou	Early Cretaceous,	Huajiying Formation	China	A member of the Enantiornithes, it is the type species of the new genus.	
Eudyptes calauina	Sp. nov.	Valid	Hoffmeister, Carrillo Briceño, & Nielsen	Pliocene	Horcón Formation	Chile	An extinct crested penguin.	
Evgenavis nobilis	Gen. et Sp. nov.	Valid	O'Connor, Averianov, & Zelenkov	Barremian-Aptian	Ilek Formation	Russia	Aves incertae sedis. it is the type species of the new genus.	
Falco hezhengensis	Sp. nov.	Valid	Zhiheng, Zhonghe, Tao, Qiang, & Clarke	Late Miocene	Linxia Basin	China	A member of the Falconidae.	
Fortunguavis xiaotaizicus	Gen. nov. et Sp. nov.	Valid	Wang Min Jingmai K. O'Connor Zhou Zhonghe	Early Cretaceous	Jiufotang Formation	China	A member of Enantiornithes Walker, 1981. This is the type species of the new genus.	
Gansus zheni	Sp. nov.	Valid	Di Liu Luis M. Chiappe Yuguang Zhang Alyssa Bell Qingjin Meng Ji Qiang Xuri Wang	Early Cretaceous	Jiufotang Formation	China	An early member of Ornithuromorpha Chiappe, 2002, a species of Gansus.	
Garganornis ballmanni	Gen. nov. et Sp. nov.	Valid	Hanneke J. M. Meijer	Miocene	Fissure fillings	Italy	A member of the Anseriformes, this is the type species of the new genus.	
Genucrassum bransatensis	Gen. nov. et Sp. nov.	Valid	Vanesa L. De Pietri; R. Paul Scofield	Late Oligocene	MP 30; 23.03 Mya	France	A stone-curlew, Burhinidae, this is the type species of the new genus.	
Grabauornis lingyuanensis	Gen. nov. et Sp. nov.	Valid	Johan Dalsätt Per G.P. Ericson Zhou Zhonghe	Early Cretaceous	Yixian Formation	China	A member of Enantiornithes Walker, 1981. This is the type species of the new genus.	
?Ibidopodia chavrochensis	Sp. nov.	Valid	Vanesa L. De Pietri Gerald Mayr	Early Miocene	Chavroches MN 2	France	An Idiornithid, Idiornithidae Cariamiformes, possibly a species of Ibidopodia Milne-Edwards, 1868.	
?Ibidopodia minuta	Sp. nov.	Valid	Vanesa L. De Pietri Gerald Mayr	Early Miocene	Saulcet	France	An Idiornithid, Idiornithidae Cariamiformes, possibly a species of Ibidopodia Milne-Edwards, 1868.	
Iteravis huchzermeyeri	Gen. nov. et sp. nov.	Valid	Shuang Zhou Jingmai K. O'Connor Min Wang	Early Cretaceous	Yixian Formation	China	A basal member of the Ornithuromorpha Chiappe, 2002. This is the type species of the new genus.	
Jeholornis curvipes	Sp. nov.	Valid	Ulysse Lefèvre Dongyu Hu François Escuillié Gareth Dyke Pascal Godefroit	Early Cretaceous	Yixian Formation	China	A member of Avialae Gauthier, 1986, a species of Jeholornis Zhou et Zhang, 2002.	
Limnofregata hutchisoni	Sp. nov.	Valid	Thomas A. Stidham	Early Eocene	Wasatch Formation	United States: Wyoming	A member of Fregatidae, a species of Limnofregata.	
Longusunguis kurochkini	Gen. nov. et Sp. nov.	Valid	Wang Min Zhou Zhonghe Jingmai K. O'Connor Nikita V. Zelenkov	Early Cretaceous	Jiufotang Formation	China	A member of Enantiornithes Walker, 1981 related to Bohaiornis. This is the type species of new genus.	
Mergellus mochanovi	Sp. nov.	Valid	Nikita V. Zelenkov Evgeny N. Kurochkin	Late Pleistocene		Russia	A member of the Anatidae related to the smew, a species of Mergellus.	
Mergus milleneri	Sp. nov.	Valid	Murray Williams Alan J. D. Tennyson	Holocene	Chatham Island	New Zealand	A member of the Anatidae.	
Nectornis africanus	Sp. nov.	Valid	Gerald Mayr	Middle Miocene	MN 5	Kenya	A cormorant, Phalacrocoracidae, a species of Nectornis Cheneval, 1984.	
Nestor chathamensis	Sp. nov.	Valid	Jamie R. Wood Kieren J. Mitchell R. Paul Scofield Alan J. D. Tennyson in Wood et al.	Holocene	Chatham Islands	New Zealand	A New Zealand parrot belonging to the family Nestoridae Bonaparte, 1849, a species of Nestor.	
?Nupharanassa mabokoensis	Sp. nov.	Valid	Gerald Mayr	Middle Miocene	MN 5	Kenya	A jacana, Jacanidae, possibly a species of Nupharanassa Rasmussen, Olson et Simons, 1987.	
Parabohaiornis martini	Gen. nov. et Sp. nov.	Valid	Wang Min Zhou Zhonghe Jingmai K. O'Connor Nikita V. Zelenkov	Early Cretaceous	Jiufotang Formation	China	A member of Enantiornithes Walker, 1981 related to Bohaiornis. The type species of the new genus, placed in the family Bohaiornithidae Wang, Zhou, O'Connor et Zelenkov, 2014 with de genera Shenqiornis Wang, O'Connor, Zhao, Chiappe, Gao et Cheng, 2010, Sulcavis O'Connor, Zhang, Chiappe, Meng, Quanguo et Di, 2013, Zhouornis Zhang, Chiappe, Han et Chinsamy, 2013, Longusunguis Wang, Zhou, O'Connor et Zelenkov, 2014 and Bohaiornis Hu, Hou L. H. et Xu, 2011.	
Parvavis chuxiongensis	Gen. nov. et Sp. nov.	Valid	Wang Min Zhou Zhonghe Xu Guanghui	Late Cretaceous, Turonian to Santonian	Jiangdihe Formation	China	A member of Enantiornithes Walker, 1981. The type species of the new genus.	
Pelagornis sandersi	Sp. nov.	Valid	Daniel T. Ksepka	Late Oligocene	Chandler Bridge Formation, Early Chattian	USA: South Carolina	A member of the Pelagornithidae Fürbringer, 1888, a species of Pelagornis Lartet, 1857; the bird with the biggest wingspan known up to now.	
Piscivoravis lii	Gen. nov. et Sp. nov.	Valid	Zhou Shuang Zhou Zhonghe Jingmai K. O'Connor	Early Cretaceous	Jiufotang Formation	China	A basal member of the Ornithuromorpha Chiappe, 2002. This is the type species the new genus.	
Plotornis graculoides	Comb. nov.	Valid	Gerald Mayr Marco Pavia	Miocene	MN 1–2	Italy	A member of the Diomedeidae, a new name for "Chenornis" graculoides Portis 1884, creating a Comb. nov.	
Protoazin parisiensis	Gen. nov. et Sp. nov.	Valid	Gerald Mayr Vanesa L. De Pietri	Late Eocene	Priabonian, MP 20	France	A relative of the hoatzin, Opisthocomidae. This is the type species of the new genus.	
Sobniogallus albinojamrozi	Gen. et Sp. nov.	Valid	Tomek, Bocheński, Wertz, & Świdnicka	Rupelian	Krosno Formation	Poland	Galliformes incertae sedis. This is the type species of the new genus.	
Tianyuornis cheni	Gen. et Sp. nov.	Valid	Xiao-Ting, O'Connor, Xiao-Li, Xiao-Mei, & Yan	Early Cretaceous	Yixian Formation	China	A member of the Hongshanornithidae, the type species of the new genus.	

== Pterosaurs ==
=== Research ===
- A study of pneumaticity of pterosaur wing bones is published by Martin and Palmer (2014).
- A complete and fully articulated juvenile specimen of Scaphognathus crassirostris is described by Bennett (2014).
- Partial 3D egg of Pterodaustro guinazui is described by Grellet-Tinner et al. (2014).
- Cearadactylus atrox is redescribed by Vila Nova et al. (2014).
- The taxonomy and distribution of the family Azhdarchidae is reviewed by Averianov (2014).
- A reevaluation of the fossil material attributed to Bakonydraco galaczi, indicating that the fossils actually represent at least two pterosaur taxa, is published by Prondvai, Bodor and Ősi (2014).
- A study of medullary bone-like tissue in the mandibular symphyses of Bakonydraco galaczi is published by Prondvai and Stein (2014).
- New postcranial remains belonging to thalassodromine pterosaurs from the Romualdo Formation in the Araripe Basin of Brazil are described by Aires et al. (2014).
- The morphology and evolution of the pelvis in pterosaurs is reviewed by Hyder et al. (2014), who also find significant differences that correlate well with several pterosaur clades.
- Bantim et al. (2014) analyze the skull variation and the shape of the sagittal premaxillary crests in anhanguerid pterosaurs using bidimensional geometric morphometrics.
- Costa et al. (2014) perform the myological reconstruction of the pelvic girdle and hindlimb of the pterosaur species Anhanguera piscator using three-dimensional virtual animation.
- Based on a digital three-dimensional osteological model of the species Anhanguera piscator, Costa et al. (2014) demonstrate that these types pterosaurs were quadrupedal animals.

=== New taxa ===
Name	Novelty	Status	Authors	Age	Unit	Location	Notes	Images
Aerodactylus	Gen. et comb. nov	Valid	Vidovic & Martill	Late Jurassic	Solnhofen Limestone	Germany	A member of Pterodactyloidea related to Gladocephaloideus, Cycnorhamphus, Ardeadactylus and Aurorazhdarcho; a new genus for "Pterodactylus" scolopaciceps Meyer (1860).	
Boreopterus giganticus	Sp. nov	Valid	Jiang et al.	Early Cretaceous		China	A species of Boreopterus.	
Caiuajara	Gen. et sp. nov	Valid	Manzig et al.	Late Cretaceous	Bauru Basin, Caiuá Group, Goio-Erê Formation	Brazil	A tapejarid. The type species is Caiuajara dobruskii.	
Hamipterus	Gen. et sp. nov	Valid	Wang et al.	Early Cretaceous	Tugulu Group	China	A member of Pteranodontoidea of uncertain phylogenetic placement. The type species is Hamipterus tianshanensis.	
Ikrandraco	Gen. et sp. nov	Valid	Wang et al.	Early Cretaceous (Aptian)	Jiufotang Formation	China	A non-anhanguerian pteranodontoid. The type species is Ikrandraco avatar. Announced in 2014; the correction including evidence of registration in ZooBank within the work itself was published in 2020.	
Kryptodrakon	Gen. et sp. nov	Valid	Andres, Clark & Xu	Middle-Late Jurassic boundary		China	An early member of Pterodactyloidea. The type species is Kryptodrakon progenitor.	
Maaradactylus	Gen. et sp. nov	Valid	Bantim et al.	Early Cretaceous (Aptian or Albian)	Romualdo Formation	Brazil	A member of Anhangueridae. The type species is Maaradactylus kellneri.	
