= Namornis =

Namornis Temporal range: Early Miocene–Middle Miocene

Egg fossil classification
- Kingdom: Animalia
- Phylum: Chordata
- Class: Aves
- Infraclass: Palaeognathae
- Order: Struthioniformes
- Family: Struthionidae
- Oogenus: †Namornis; Pickford, Senut & Dauphin, 1994

Species
- †N. elimensis; †N. oshanai

Extinct oogenus of Struthionid

Namornis is an extinct oogenus of Struthioniformes that lived during the early to middle Miocene epoch of Namibia. There are currently two species that have been described belonging to this genus, N. elimensis and N. oshanai (the type species.)

Material from this genus is younger than that of Tsondabornis but still among the oldest of the order.

== Etymology ==
Pickford states that the species name for N. elimensis refers to the Elim Gullies north of Sossus Vlei, eroded into the Tsondab Sandstone, where the type series was collected.

== Evolution ==
Pickford considered the early Miocene Tsondabornis eggshell as the direct predecessor of Namornis elimensis.

Mikhailov and Zelenkov dispute this theory and instead consider it more likely that N. elimensis is not a descendant of Tsondabornis, but rather its own lineage of Struthionidae, which might have replaced Tsondabornis in Namibia towards the middle Miocene.

== Description ==
=== Namornis elimensis ===
The eggshells of Namornis elimensis range from 2.5 to 3.7 mm thick with the average being 3.2 mm thick. The external surface of Namornis elimensis is patterned in a complex undulating system of depressions and pore complexes. Material found at Tsondab Vlei have about 40 pore complexes per 4 cm² while material found at Elim and Diep Rivier have been reported to have 24-37 pore complexes per 4 cm². Its pores are arranged both in clusters in the depths of vermiform depressions and in sub-parallel slits similar to those seen in aepyornithoids. The edges of these slits are swollen.

The holotype for this species consists of fragmentary remains of eggshells that were uncovered in Elim Gullies and Tsondab Sandstone dated to around 17-16.5 million years old. Strangely, remains of Namornis elimensis occur by themselves and at most occur in pairs. This results in their remains being found in small patches of shell fragments and not in immense concentrations of broken eggshells.

=== Namornis oshanai ===
The eggshells of N. oshanai range in thickness 3.2 to 4 mm (or as low as 2.2 mm), with a mean thickness of 3.6 mm. This makes it notably thicker than those of extant ostriches and even several larger extinct species of related birds such as Pachystruthio pannonicus. Sauer estimated that the egg of the previously mentioned Pachystruthio pannonicus has twice the volume of Struthio camelus and is comparable in size with the eggs of Namornis oshanai.
