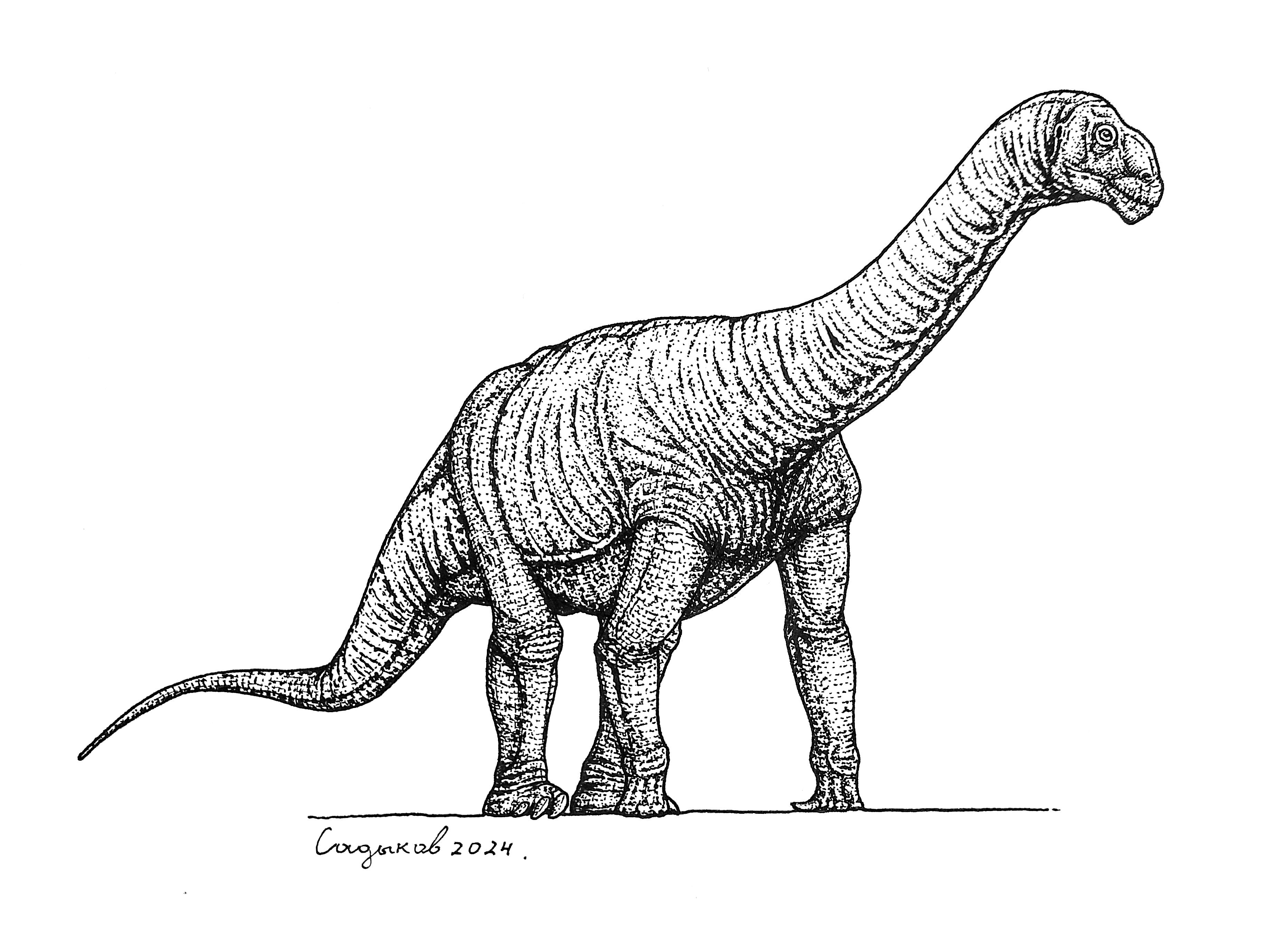
- Speculative reconstruction based on relatives

Scientific classification
- Kingdom: Animalia
- Phylum: Chordata
- Class: Reptilia
- Clade: Dinosauria
- Clade: Saurischia
- Clade: †Sauropodomorpha
- Clade: †Sauropoda
- Clade: †Eusauropoda
- Genus: †Perijasaurus; Rincón et al., 2022
- Species: †P. lapaz

Binomial name
- †Perijasaurus lapaz Rincón et al., 2022

= Perijasaurus =

Perijasaurus Temporal range: Early Jurassic, 175.5–174.8 Ma

Genus of sauropod dinosaurs

Perijasaurus (meaning "Perija lizard") is a genus of basal eusauropod sauropod dinosaur from the "Girón-type redbeds" of the La Quinta Formation of Cesar Department, north-eastern Colombia. The type species is Perijasaurus lapaz. It lived during the Toarcian-Aalenian boundary around 175 million years ago (early to middle Jurassic period).

== Discovery and naming ==
The holotype, UCMP 37689, is a broken dorsal vertebra, around 55 cm (22 in) tall and 45 cm (18 in) centimeters long. It was discovered on 27 March 1943 at the western flank of the Serranía del Perijá mountain range by the Tropical Oil Company and was sent to the fossil collection at the University of California, Berkeley. Starting in 1955, UCMP 37689 had been mentioned in the literature with no consensus developing over its affinities. Eventually, the original site was rediscovered and the bone was prepared, allowing it to be named as a new genus and species, Perijasaurus lapaz, in 2022. The generic name, "Perijasaurus", honors the mountain range where the fossil was found. The specific name, "lapaz", honors the town of La Paz, Cesar, near where the discovery was made, as well as the peace agreement that allowed the described to perform fieldwork in the area ("la paz" in Spanish means "the peace").

== Classification ==
Rincón et al. (2022) found Perijasaurus to be a basal eusauropod. The results of their phylogenetic analyses are shown in the cladogram below:

- Eusauropoda
  - Archaeodontosaurus
  - - Barapasaurus
    - Shunosaurus
    - - Cetiosaurus
      - Perijasaurus
      - - - Patagosaurus
          - - Bagualia
            - Nebulasaurus
            - Spinophorosaurus
      - - Mamenchisauridae
        - - Turiasauria
          - - Jobaria
            - Neosauropoda

== Paleoenvironment ==
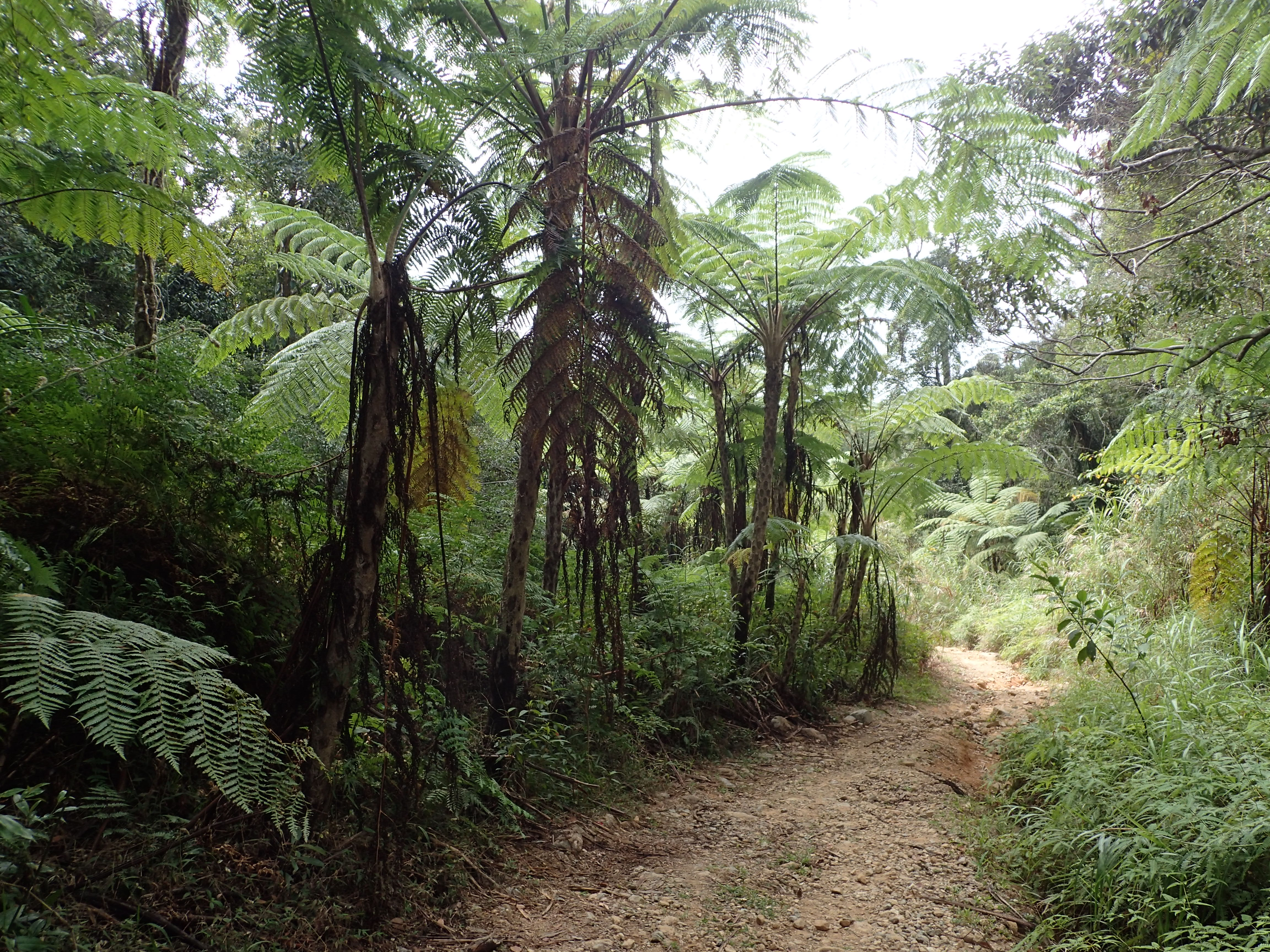
Example of Lowland Rainforest in modern Filipinas. Perijasaurus is thought to have inhabited a similar environment

Perijasaurus hails from the La Quinta Formation of northern South America, in what is now Colombia and Venezuela, making it the northernmost sauropod from South America ever recorded as well as the first dinosaur found in the Colombian part of the La Quinta Formation. The La Quinta environment is interpreted as a tropical lowland forest. Its location and time suggests eusauropods reached a broad distribution before the breakup of Pangaea and the Toarcian faunal turnover. Other dinosaurs from this formation include the stem-averostran theropod Tachiraptor and the ornithischian Laquintasaura, both from Venezuela and from older (Hettangian) layers.
