= Aegypius varswaterensis =

Aegypius varswaterensis Temporal range: Zanclean

Scientific classification
- Kingdom: Animalia
- Phylum: Chordata
- Class: Aves
- Order: Accipitriformes
- Family: Accipitridae
- Genus: Aegypius
- Species: †A. varswaterensis

Binomial name
- †Aegypius varswaterensis Manegold et al., 2014

Extinct species of bird

Aegypius varswaterensis is an extinct species of Aegypius that lived in South Africa during the Zanclean stage.
