= Falco hezhengensis =

Falco hezhengensis Temporal range: Late Miocene

Scientific classification
- Kingdom: Animalia
- Phylum: Chordata
- Class: Aves
- Order: Falconiformes
- Family: Falconidae
- Genus: Falco
- Species: †F. hezhengensis

Binomial name
- †Falco hezhengensis Li et al., 2014

Extinct species of bird

Falco hezhengensis is an extinct species of Falco that lived in China during the Late Miocene.
