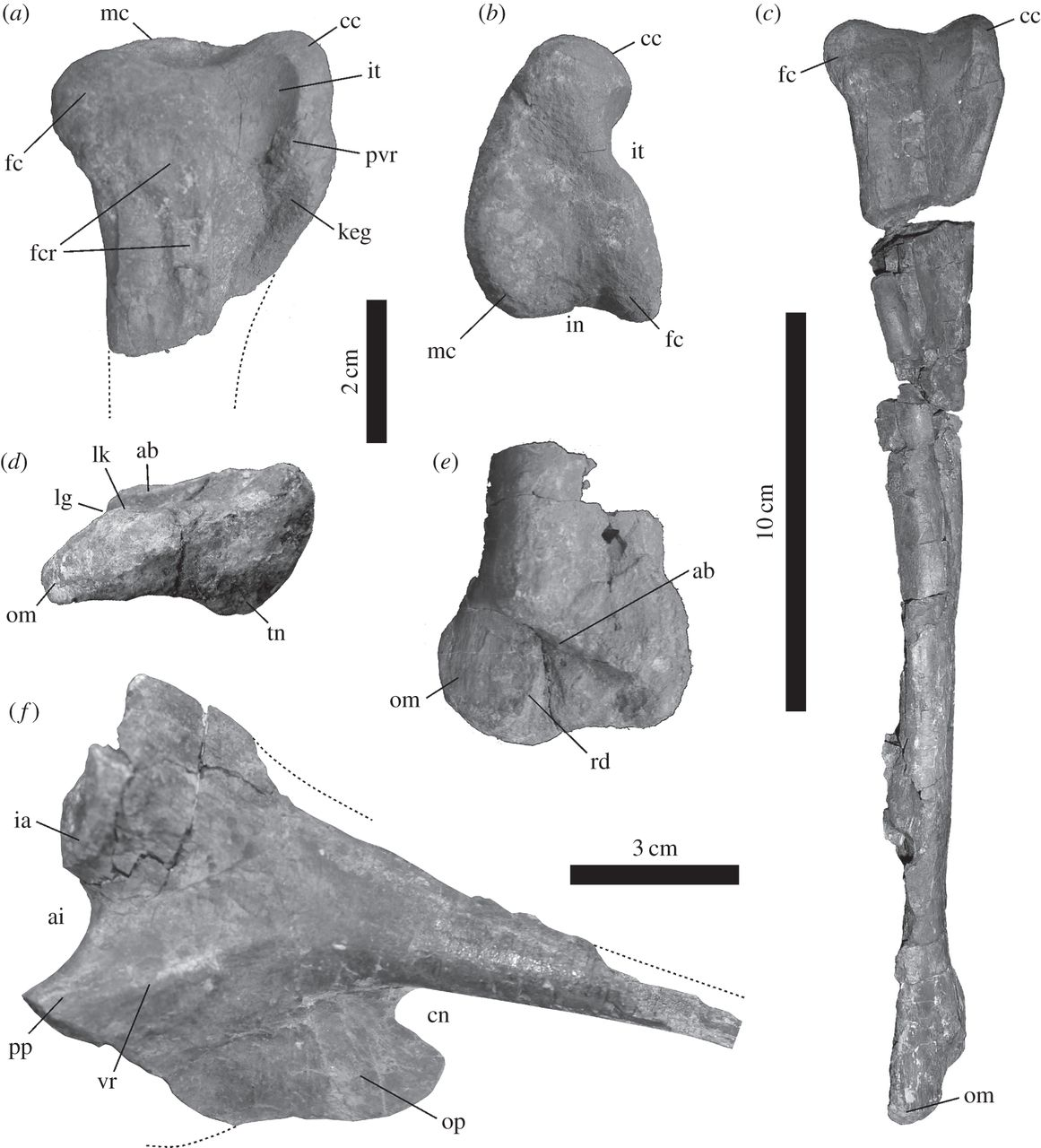
- IVIC-P-2687, the holotype right tibia, and IVIC-P-2868, the referred left ischium

Scientific classification
- Kingdom: Animalia
- Phylum: Chordata
- Class: Reptilia
- Clade: Dinosauria
- Clade: Saurischia
- Clade: Theropoda
- Clade: Neotheropoda
- Genus: †Tachiraptor; Langer, Rincón, Ramezani, Solórzano, & Rauhut, 2014
- Species: †T. admirabilis

Binomial name
- †Tachiraptor admirabilis Langer, Rincón, Ramezani, Solórzano, & Rauhut, 2014

= Tachiraptor =

Tachiraptor Temporal range: Early Jurassic, 201.46–200.36 Ma Hettangian

Extinct genus of dinosaurs

Tachiraptor is a genus of carnivorous theropod dinosaurs found in the early Jurassic period La Quinta Formation of Venezuela. It includes one species, Tachiraptor admirabilis, described from a fossilized tibia and ischium. They were small bipedal dinosaurs, with a deduced total body length of just over 1.5 m (4.9 ft).

== Discovery ==
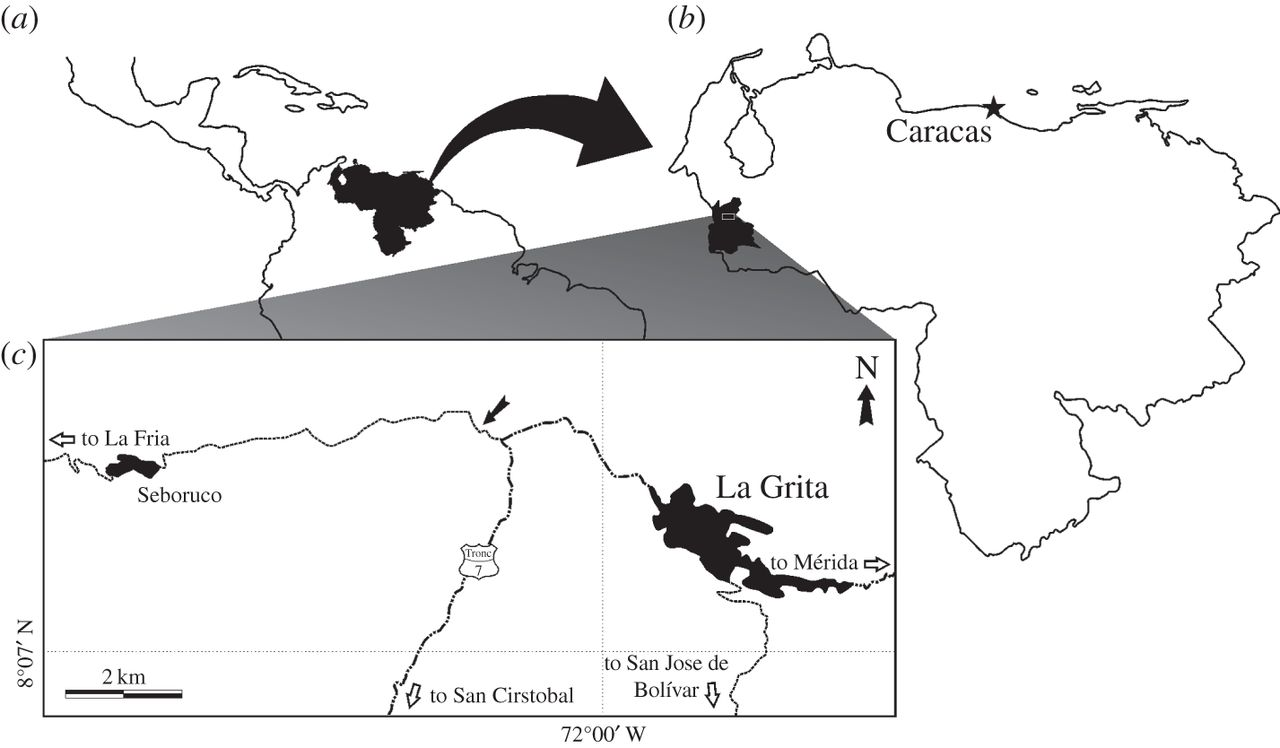
Tachiraptor admirabilis type locality in Venezuela

Since the late 1980s in the Venezuelan state of Táchira, remains of dinosaurs have been uncovered at a road-cut between La Grita and Seboruco. Most of these belonged to a small herbivore that in 2014 was described as Laquintasaura. However, included in the discoveries were some theropod teeth, indicating a predator must have been present. In 2013, this was affirmed by the discovery of some theropod bones.

In 2014, the type species Tachiraptor admirabilis was named and described by Max Cardoso Langer, Ascanio D. Rincón, Jahandar Ramezani, Andrés Solórzano and Oliver Rauhut.

The description was based on two fossils, found in a layer of the La Quinta Formation dating from the Early Jurassic Hettangian stage. The region was once part of the equatorial belt of the ancient supercontinent of Pangaea. A maximum age of 200.72 ± 0.32 million years ago has been confidently established, but due to the limits of zircon radiometric dating, a precise minimum estimate is not known; the actual age could be considerably younger. Both fossils are from the same location, but assumed to represent two individuals. One of these was the holotype specimen, IVIC-P-2867. It consists of a nearly complete right tibia or shinbone. The second fossil was referred to Tachiraptor admirabilis on the assumption that only one species of neotheropod of such a size was present in the La Quinta Formation. It is specimen IVIC-P-2868, consisting of the damaged upper half of a left ischium, a bone of the pelvis.

== Etymology ==
The generic name was derived from Greek tachyon (ταχύς tachús – fast), combined with the Latin word for thief, raptor. The specific name admirabilis was chosen in reference to the Admirable Campaign of 1813, conducted by Simón Bolívar, for which the type locality of La Grita was of strategic importance.

== Description ==
Tachiraptor was a small bipedal predator. The shinbone has a length of about 25 cm (9.8 in); from this, the total body length of the animal has been deduced at just over 1.5 m (4.9 ft).

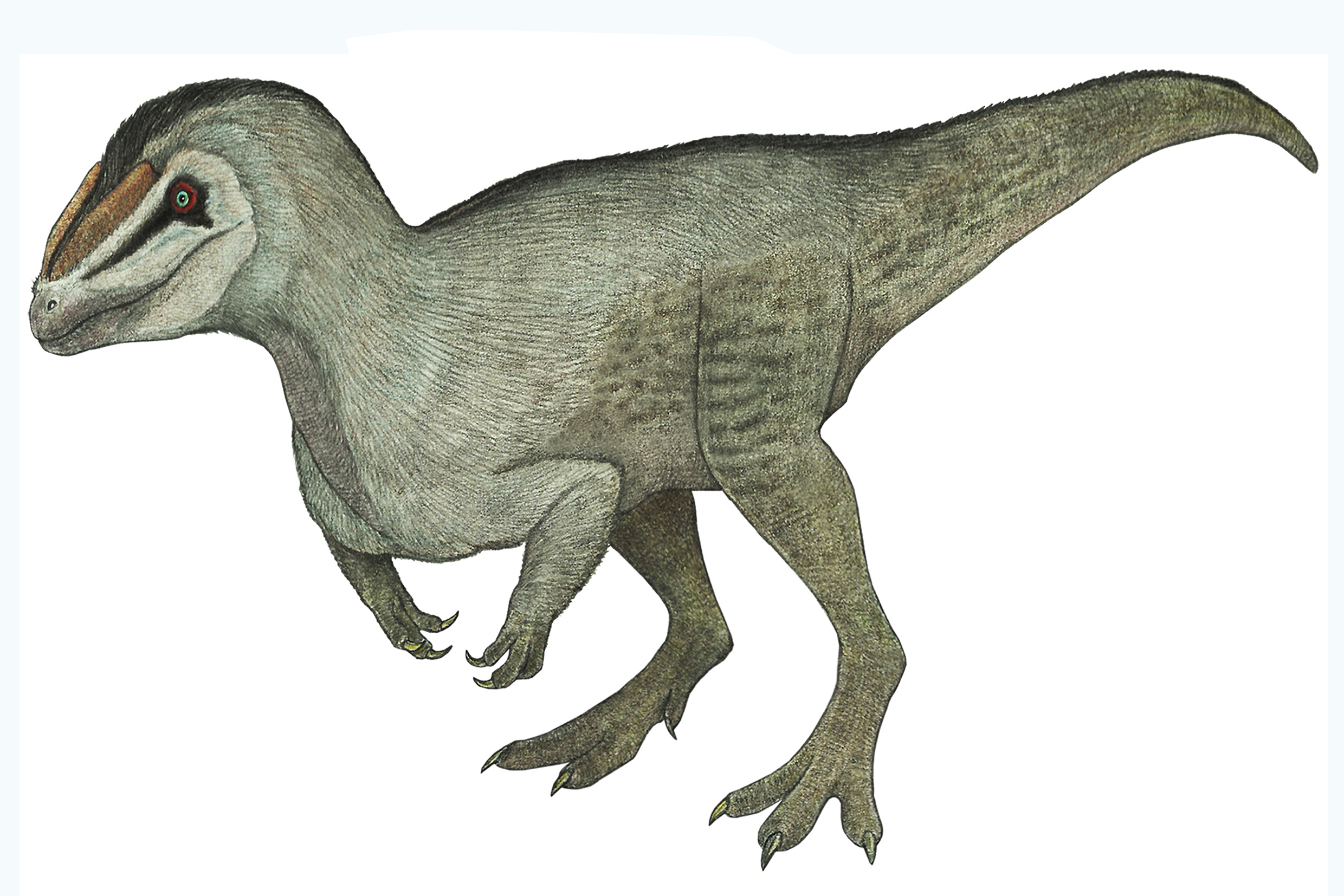
Life reconstruction of Tachiraptor

The authors established a number of distinguishing traits. One of these is a possible autapomorphy, a unique evolutionary innovation shown just by Tachiraptor. It pertains to the profile, seen from above, of the upper surface of the shinbone. Such surfaces generally have two projections, corners jutting out to behind, left and right. In Tachiraptor the outer projection, at the side of the fibula, has a rear edge making a sharp angle with the outer edge. This way a uniquely sharp point is formed which, uniquely also, extends further to behind than the inner projection at the opposite side.

Apart from the autapomorphy, a unique combination of, in themselves not unique, traits was also demonstrated. The bottom surface of the shinbone was, in its transverse width, about 1.5 times as wide as the longitudinal distance (measured from front to rear). In dinosaurs in general, the lower front of the shinbone is covered by the talus bone. A ridge on the front surface demarcates the upper limit of this area. In Tachiraptor this ridge ran obliquely at an angle of about 35° to the lower edge of the shinbone, covering a vertical distance of about a quarter to a third of the lower shinbone height. At its lower end, this ridge slightly curved upwards, being at this point close to the outer edge of the shinbone, at about a fifth of its transverse width. The shinbone extends to below in two bumps, left and right. When seen from the front, with Tachiraptor a line drawn between the bumps made an angle of 80° with the vertical axis of the bone.

== Phylogeny ==
The study describing Tachiraptor performed a cladistic analysis, establishing its probable evolutionary relationships (phylogeny) by computing an evolutionary tree assuming the fewest evolutionary changes. This analysis showed that Tachiraptor was a basal member of the Neotheropoda, the subgroup encompassing all but the earliest theropods. It thus was placed low in the evolutionary tree of the neotheropods. Tachiraptor was part of the stem leading to the Averostra, the group all theropods belong to from the Middle Jurassic onwards, including the birds. Being a sister species of the Averostra, it was described as a "stem-averostran". This made the discovery of Tachiraptor especially important, because before 2014, there were no unequivocal stem-averostrans known at all. Tachiraptor thus reduced their ghost lineage (an inferred though yet unproven line of descent) by twenty-five million years.

Tachiraptor also contributed to a greater knowledge of evolution by confirming that the equatorial zone of the supercontinent Pangea played an important role in the development of early dinosaurs, as already shown by the discovery of Laquintasaura.

== Paleoenvironment ==
Tachiraptor hails from the La Quinta Formation of northern South America, in what is now Colombia and Venezuela, and was found in the Venezuelan part of the formation. The La Quinta environment is interpreted as a tropical lowland forest. Its location and time suggests eusauropods reached a broad distribution before the breakup of Pangaea and the Toarcian faunal turnover. Other dinosaurs from this formation include the eusauropod Perijasaurus, from Colombia, and the ornithischian Laquintasaura, from Venezuela.
