= Tsondabornis =

Tsondabornis Temporal range: Early Miocene

Egg fossil classification
- Kingdom: Animalia
- Phylum: Chordata
- Class: Aves
- Infraclass: Palaeognathae
- Order: Struthioniformes
- Family: Struthionidae
- Oogenus: †Tsondabornis; Pickford, 2013

Species
- †T. psammoides; †T. minor

Extinct oogenus of Struthionid

Tsondabornis is an oogenus of extinct Struthionidae which lived in the early Miocene of Namibia. There are two species of this genus, T. psammoides and T. minor.

Pickford states the genus name refers to the Tsondab area where the material was collected and ornis, the Greek word for bird.

Material from this genus is among the oldest of any Struthioniformes, close in age to that of another early Miocene ostrich Struthio coppensi.

The eggshells are 1–1.7 mm thick in T. minor and 1.3–2.3 mm in T. psammoides
