= List of Pterocliformes by population =

This is a list of Pterocliformes species by global population. Pterocliformes is a monotypic order which contains the sandgrouse family (Pteroclidae). While numbers are estimates, they have been made by the experts in their fields. For more information on how these estimates were ascertained, see Wikipedia's articles on population biology and population ecology.

Not all Pterocliformes have had their numbers quantified, but species without population estimates are included in a secondary table below.

The IOC World Bird List (version 15.1) recognizes 16 species of Pterocliformes. As of January 2026, IUCN/BirdLife International have assessed all members of the order, though only two have population estimates.

== Species by global population ==
Common name	Binomial name	Population	Status	Trend	Notes	Image
Black-bellied sandgrouse	Pterocles orientalis	130,000-259,999	LC	▼	Preliminary estimate based on extrapolation of European population.	
Pin-tailed sandgrouse	Pterocles alchata	170,000-250,000	LC	Steady	Preliminary estimate based on extrapolation of European population.	

== Species without population estimates ==
Common name	Binomial name	Population	Status	Trend	Notes	Image
Double-banded sandgrouse	Pterocles bicinctus	unknown	LC	▼		
Burchell's sandgrouse	Pterocles burchelli	unknown	LC	Steady		
Crowned sandgrouse	Pterocles coronatus	unknown	LC	Steady		
Black-faced sandgrouse	Pterocles decoratus	unknown	LC	Steady		
Chestnut-bellied sandgrouse	Pterocles exustus	unknown	LC	Steady		
Yellow-throated sandgrouse	Pterocles gutturalis	unknown	LC	▼		
Painted sandgrouse	Pterocles indicus	unknown	LC	Steady		
Lichtenstein's sandgrouse	Pterocles lichtensteinii	unknown	LC	Steady		
Namaqua sandgrouse	Pterocles namaqua	unknown	LC	Steady		
Madagascar sandgrouse	Pterocles personatus	unknown	LC	Steady		
Four-banded sandgrouse	Pterocles quadricinctus	unknown	LC	Steady		
Spotted sandgrouse	Pterocles senegallus	unknown	LC	Steady		
Pallas's sandgrouse	Syrrhaptes paradoxus	unknown	LC	Steady	This species has several wide-ranging national population estimates, but not enough data for a global population estimate.	
Tibetan sandgrouse	Syrrhaptes tibetanus	unknown	LC	▼		

== See also ==
- Lists of birds by population
- Lists of organisms by population
