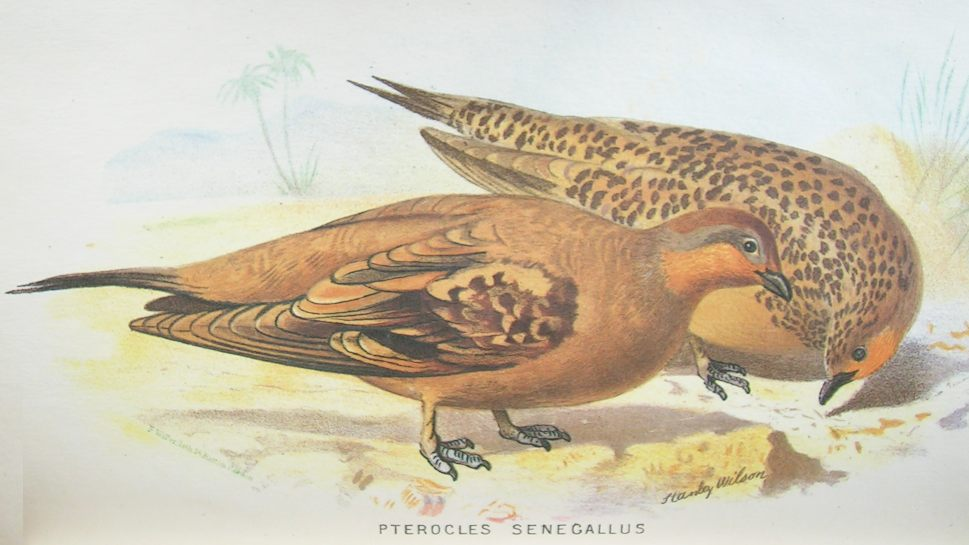
- Spotted sandgrouse

Scientific classification
- Kingdom: Animalia
- Phylum: Chordata
- Class: Aves
- Order: Pterocliformes
- Family: Pteroclidae
- Genus: Pterocles; Temminck, 1815

Type species
- Tetrao alchata (pin-tailed sandgrouse) Linnaeus, 1766

Species
- See text

= Pterocles =

Genus of birds

Pterocles is a genus of birds in the sandgrouse family Pteroclidae. It includes all the species in the family except for two central Asian species in Syrrhaptes.

These sandgrouse have small, pigeon-like heads and necks, but sturdy compact bodies. They have long pointed wings and sometimes tails. Their legs are feathered down to the toes, but unlike species of the genus Syrrhaptes the toes are not feathered.

Pterocles species have a fast direct flight, and flocks fly to watering holes at dawn and dusk.

Two to three eggs are laid directly on the ground. They are buff or greenish with cryptic markings. All species are resident.

== Taxonomy ==
The genus Pterocles was introduced in 1815 by the Dutch zoologist Coenraad Jacob Temminck. The type species was subsequently designated by the English zoologist George Robert Gray as the pin-tailed sandgrouse. The genus name combines the Ancient Greek πτερόν pteron meaning "wing" with -κλης -klēs meaning "notable" or "splendid".

== Species ==
The genus contains 14 extant species:

Image	Common name	Scientific name	Distribution
	Pin-tailed sandgrouse	Pterocles alchata	North Africa and the Middle East, Turkey, Iran, Iraq and Kazakhstan, Spain, Portugal
	Namaqua sandgrouse	Pterocles namaqua	Angola, Namibia, Zimbabwe, Botswana, Lesotho and South Africa
	Chestnut-bellied sandgrouse	Pterocles exustus	central and northern Africa, and southern Asia
	Spotted sandgrouse	Pterocles senegallus	Morocco, Algeria, Tunisia, Libya, Sudan, Egypt, Eritrea, Somalia, Ethiopia, Djibouti, Mali, Mauritania, Chad and Niger
	Black-bellied sandgrouse	Pterocles orientalis	Iberia, northwest Africa, the Canary Islands, Turkey, Iran, Cyprus and Israel
	Crowned sandgrouse	Pterocles coronatus	North Africa and the Middle East.
	Yellow-throated sandgrouse	Pterocles gutturalis	Angola, Botswana, Eritrea, Ethiopia, Kenya, Namibia, South Africa, Tanzania, Zambia, and Zimbabwe.
	Burchell's sandgrouse	Pterocles burchelli	Angola, Namibia, Botswana, Zambia, Zimbabwe and South Africa
	Madagascar sandgrouse	Pterocles personatus	Madagascar
	Black-faced sandgrouse	Pterocles decoratus	Ethiopia, Kenya, Somalia, Tanzania, and Uganda.
	Lichtenstein's sandgrouse	Pterocles lichtensteinii	Algeria, Chad, Djibouti, Egypt, Eritrea, Ethiopia, Libya, Mali, Mauritania, Morocco, Niger, Senegal, Somalia, Sudan, Uganda, Iran, Iraq, Jordan, Oman, Pakistan, Palestine, Saudi Arabia, Israel, the United Arab Emirates and Yemen.
	Double-banded sandgrouse	Pterocles bicinctus	southern Africa.
	Painted sandgrouse	Pterocles indicus	Bangladesh, India and Pakistan.
	Four-banded sandgrouse	Pterocles quadricinctus	Africa from Mauritania and Cameroon east to Sudan and Uganda

A fossil species, Pterocles bosporanus, is known from the early Pleistocene of Crimea.
