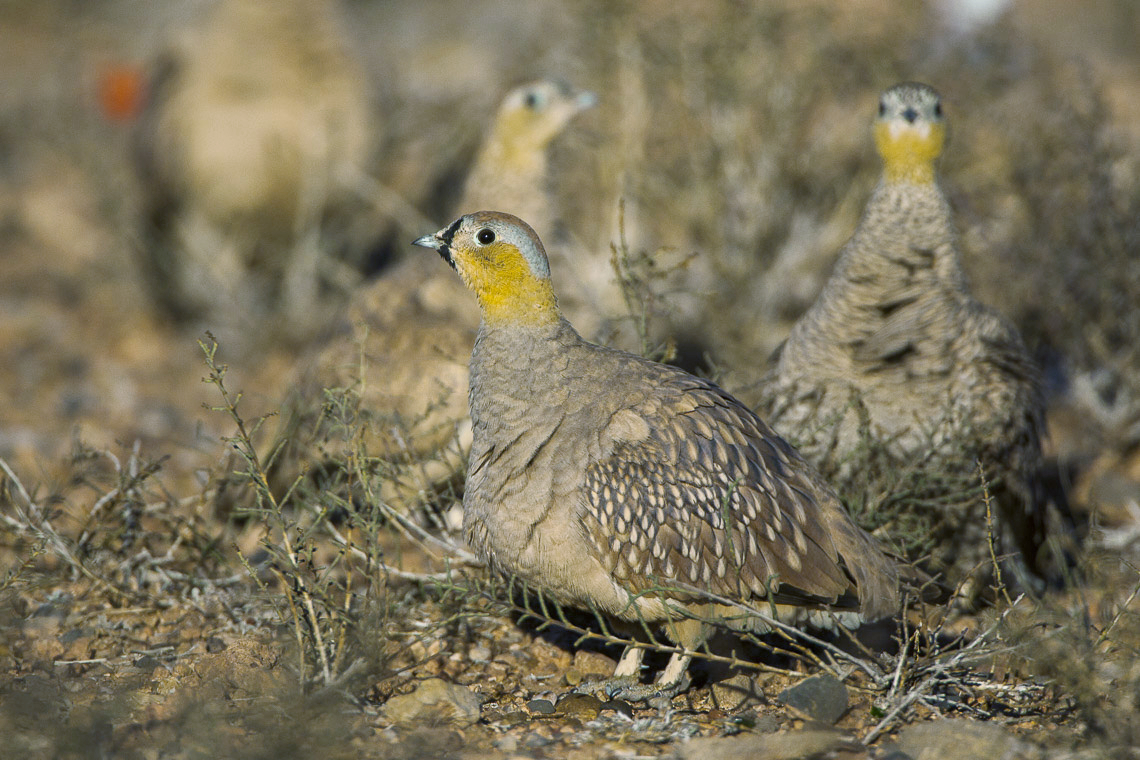

Conservation status
- Least Concern (IUCN 3.1)

Scientific classification
- Kingdom: Animalia
- Phylum: Chordata
- Class: Aves
- Order: Pterocliformes
- Family: Pteroclidae
- Genus: Pterocles
- Species: P. coronatus

Binomial name
- Pterocles coronatus Lichtenstein, MHC, 1823
- World distribution

= Crowned sandgrouse =

Species of bird

The crowned sandgrouse (Pterocles coronatus) is a species of bird in the sandgrouse family, the Pteroclidae from North Africa and the Middle East.

== Description ==
A fairly small sandgrouse which appears rather uniformly coloured from a distance except for darker flight feathers, the wholly dark flight feathers being the best feature to identify crowned sandgrouse from the similar spotted sandgrouse. The dark flight feathers contrast with the sandy upper wing coverts and the creamy underwing coverts. The adult male has a black mask and lacks any grey tones on the neck and breast. The females and immatures lack the black mask and differ from spotted sandgrouse in having dark vermiculations, rather than spots, across the breast and all of the belly and not confined to the breast and upper belly as in spotted sandgrouse. They are 27–29 cm (10.6–11.4 in) long and have a wingspan of 52–63 cm (20–25 in).

== Distribution ==
The crowned sandgrouse occurs in North Africa and south Asia and is found from Mauritania in the west through the Middle East to Pakistan.

== Habitat ==
The crowned sandgrouse is a bird of deserts, preferring stony deserts rather than sandy ones. In North Africa breeds among dark red sandstone which matches its plumage colour. Avoids areas with too much vegetation.

== Habits ==
The crowned sandgrouse is rather nomadic in the dry season and is recorded away from areas where breeding is known. For example, it is scarce in Libya north of 32°N but is frequent at Wadi Caam in the dry season of June to September. It is gregarious outside the breeding season, especially when visiting water resources which it flies to in early and mid morning and again towards sunset. It mainly feeds on hard seeds but also feeds on shoots of grass and other plants.

The nest is a shallow depression on open ground and has no lining, although there may be a circle of stones around the nest as the birds move any small stones within the depression to the rim when they start laying. Clutch is 2–3 eggs which are incubated for just over three weeks and the chicks fledge in 24–28 days.

== Taxonomy ==
Previously the crowned sandgrouse was included in genus Eremialector and recent studies suggest that it is part of a clade that also includes the yellow-throated sandgrouse P. gutturalis and the Madagascar sandgrouse P. personatus; and these may form a group along with the two Syrrhaptes species, black-bellied sandgrouse P. orientalis, Namaqua sandgrouse P. namaqua and chestnut-bellied sandgrouse P. exustus, and possibly including also P. alchata and P. burchelli; further study is required.

Five subspecies are currently recognised:

- Pterocles coronatus coronatus M. H. C. Lichtenstein, 1823: Sahara Desert from southern Morocco, Western Sahara and Mauritania east to north central Sudan and the Red Sea coast.
- Pterocles coronatus vastitas R. Meinertzhagen, 1928 – Sinai and neighbouring areas of Israel and Jordan.
- Pterocles coronatus saturatus Kinnear, 1927 – the hilly country of interior Oman.
- Pterocles coronatus atratus E. J. O. Hartert, 1902 – Southern Arabia (except interior Oman) and southern Iran east to south-western Afghanistan and Baluchistan.
- Pterocles coronatus ladas Koelz, 1954 – Sind.

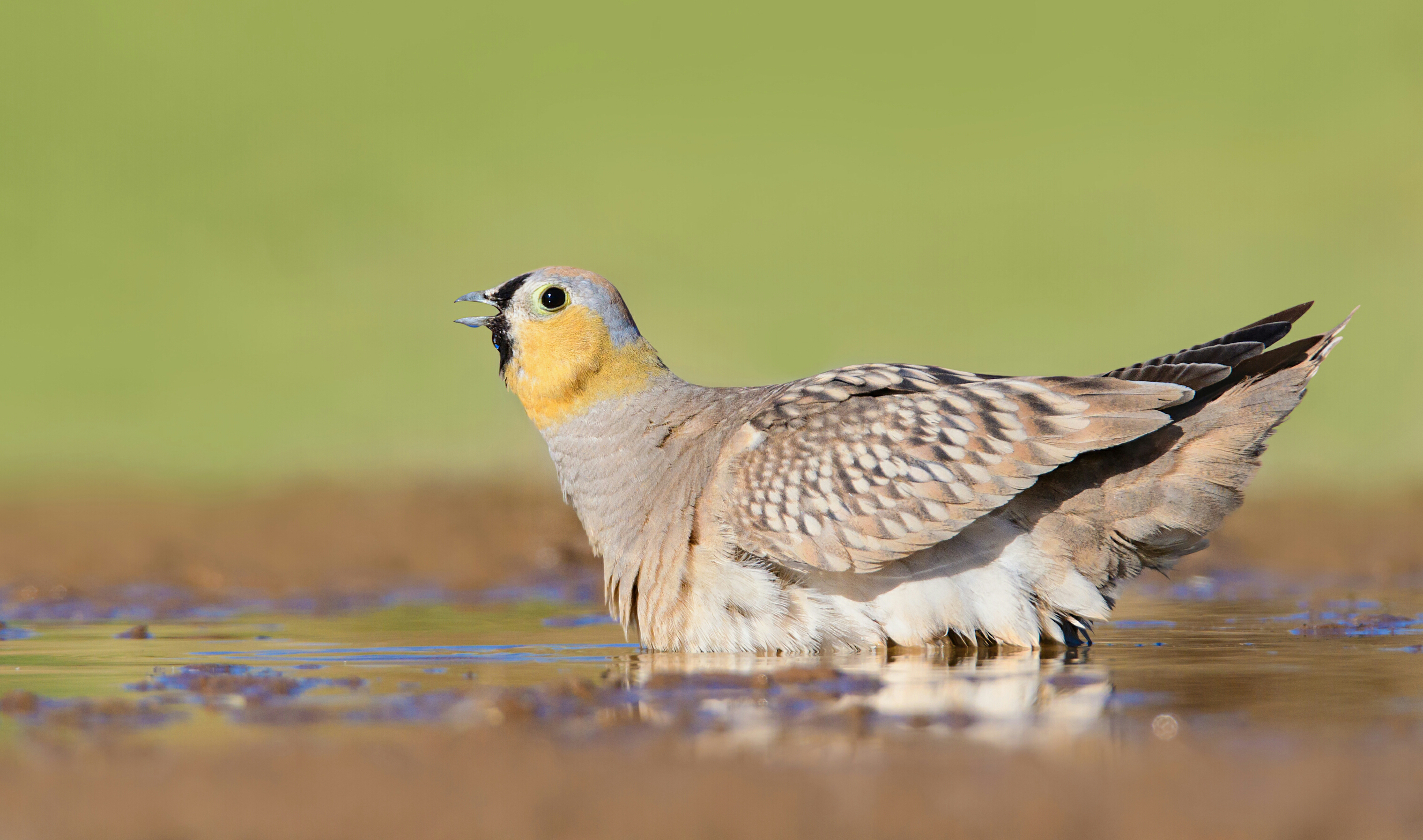
Crowned sandgrouse
