= Pterocles bosporanus =

Pterocles bosporanus Temporal range: Early Pleistocene, 1.8–1.5 Ma

Scientific classification
- Kingdom: Animalia
- Phylum: Chordata
- Class: Aves
- Order: Pterocliformes
- Family: Pteroclidae
- Genus: Pterocles
- Species: †P. bosporanus

Binomial name
- †Pterocles bosporanus Zelenkov, 2023

Extinct species of bird

Pterocles bosporanus is an extinct species of sandgrouse, described in 2023 from early Pleistocene-aged fossil material found in central Crimea. Potential additional remains are known from Italy. The only confirmed specimen is part of a limb bone, and the species is larger than other members of the genus Pterocles.

== Discovery and naming ==
The holotype, PIN, no. 5644/1523, represents the distal end of the left tibiotarsus and has been placed in the Borissiak Paleontological institute, Russian Academy of Sciences. The specimen is currently the only known material of this species, and was collected in 2018 from early Pleistocene-aged Taurida Cave in Belogorsky District, Crimea. The species was officially named in 2023, and the specific name references the Bosporan Kingdom.

Fossilized coracoids found in the late Pleistocene locality of Pirro-Nord, Italy represent a bird comparable in size to P. bosporanus, and have been attributed to the black-bellied sandgrouse. These may actually represent additional remains of P. bosporanus, but the lack of overlapping material makes this uncertain.

== Description ==
Pterocles bosporanus is a medium large bird, resembling the black-bellied sandgrouse (the largest living sandgrouse) in absolute size, and is larger than its extant congeners. Currently, the only confirmed material of the species is part of the tibiotarsus. The condyles are in close proximity with each other, forming a proximodistally narrow articular surface resembling a block, and are near the distal aperture of the canalis extensorius. The apex of the medial condyle is notably more proximally protruding than the lateral condyle. The distal end of the tibiotarsus is rather wide in distal view.

== Paleoenvironment ==
This species has only been confirmed to occur at Taurida Cave, a large karst cave in the Crimean Mountains. The fossil assemblage of this locality reflects a warm, almost subtropical climate in a savannah-like habitat. Large mammalian herbivores are common in this assemblage, including bovids (Bison, Leptobos, Gazellospira and Pontoceros), rhinocerotids (Elasmotherium and Stephanorhinus), a camel (Paracamelus), the southern mammoth, a deer (Avernoceros) and two horses of the genus Equus. The apex predator guild was made up of the felid Homotherium, the hyena Pachycrocuta and a small wolf (Canis sp.). Small mammals such as a porcupine and Hypolagus were also present. Other birds found at this site include a goshawk, a capercaillie, a little bustard, a falconid and the giant ostrich Struthio dmanisensis.

== See also ==
- List of bird species described in the 2020s
