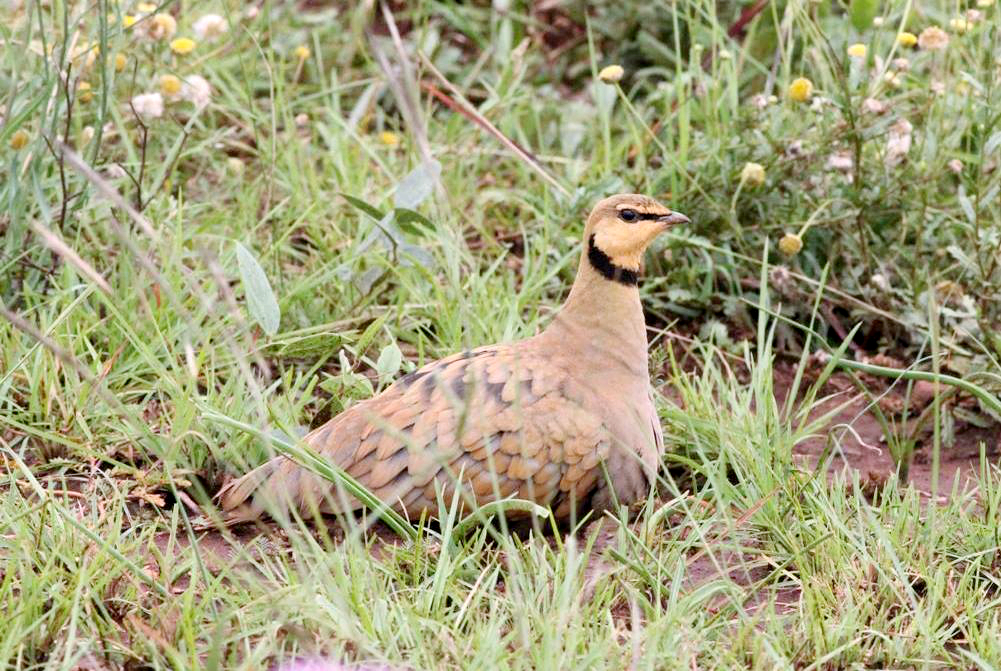
- Male P. g. gutturalis, Gerardsville, Gauteng, South Africa

Conservation status
- Least Concern (IUCN 3.1)

Scientific classification
- Kingdom: Animalia
- Phylum: Chordata
- Class: Aves
- Order: Pterocliformes
- Family: Pteroclidae
- Genus: Pterocles
- Species: P. gutturalis

Binomial name
- Pterocles gutturalis Smith, 1836
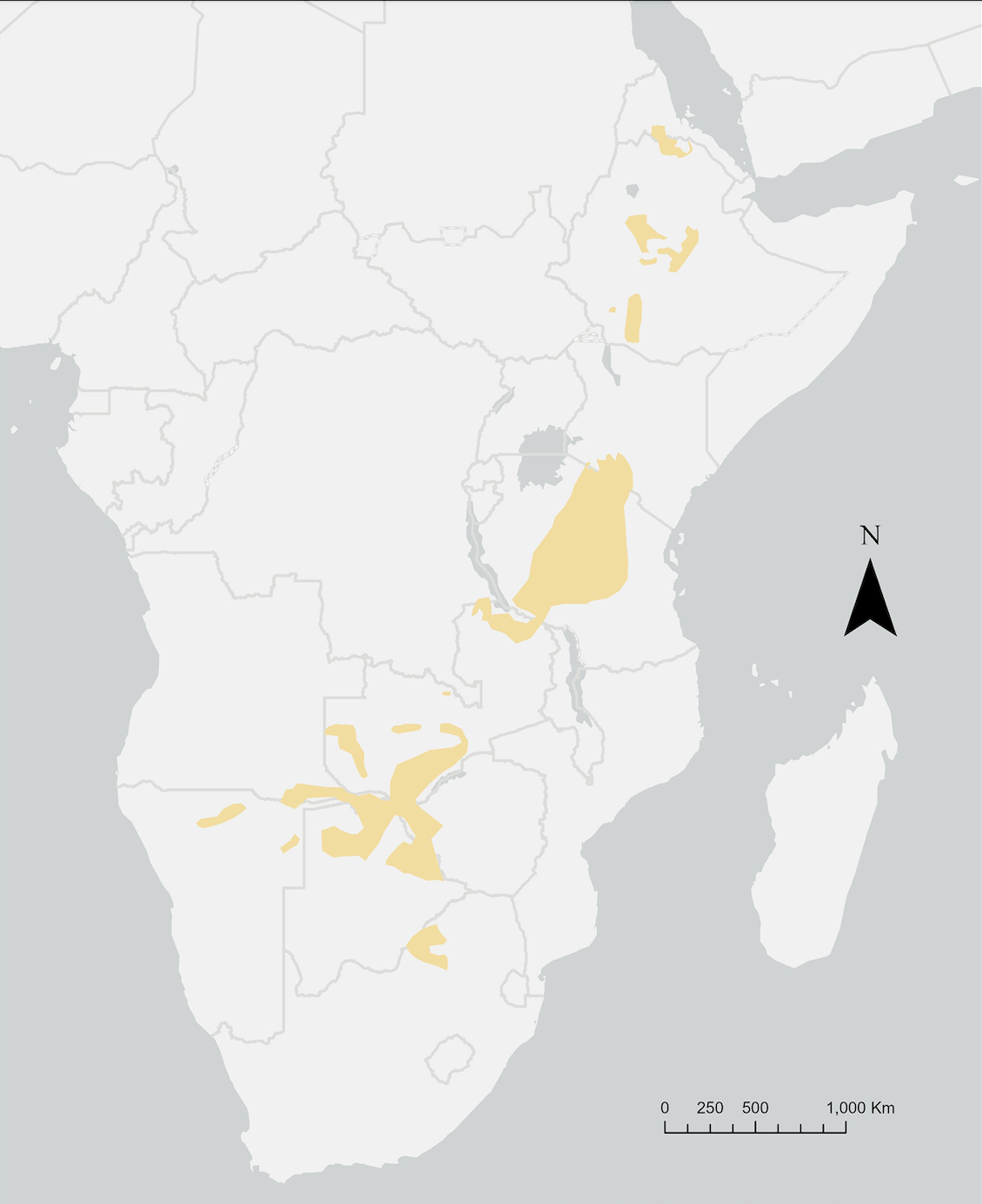
- Distribution of the yellow-throated sandgrouse

= Yellow-throated sandgrouse =

Species of bird

The yellow-throated sandgrouse (Pterocles gutturalis) is a bird species of the family Pteroclidae. The species common name is derived from the male's distinctive yellow throat. It is found in arid and semi-arid environments and inhabits regions distributed across 10 different African countries. Two subspecies are accepted, P. g. saturatior and P. g. gutturalis. The yellow-throated sandgrouse is listed as Near Threatened in the South African regional assessment but regarded as Least Concerned globally.

== Taxonomy ==
Pterocles gutturalis is one of the 16 species in Pteroclidae, the only family in the order Pterocliformes. Early morphological analyses placed the group at an intermediate position between fowls and pigeons (Columbiformes). However, a later study on feather structure suggest a closer evolutionary connection with shorebirds (Charadriiformes).

Molecular and behavioural analyses support that the yellow-throated sandgrouse is part of the short-tailed clade, which also includes the Madagascar sandgrouse (P. personatus), and the crowned sandgrouse (P. coronatus). Genetic assessments indicate that P. personatus, a species found only in Madagascar, is the sister species of the yellow-throated sandgrouse. The species was divided into two subspecies with the description of subspecies P. g. saturatior in 1900.

== Description ==
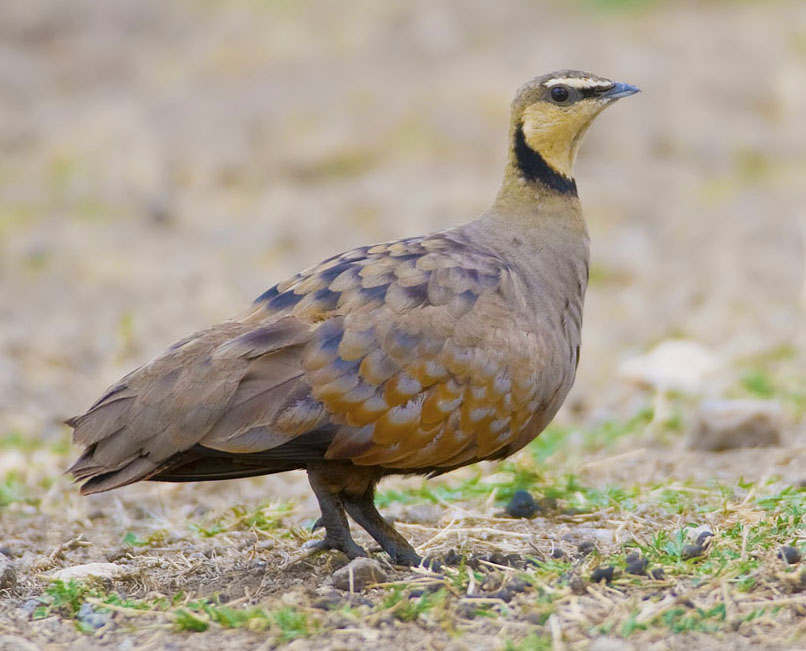
Male P. g. saturatior at Serengeti National Park, Tanzania

The species has long and pointed wings adapted to fly over long distances. Most of its body and legs are feathered, which reduces heat gain through convection. Males and females are of similar size. They have an average weight of 350 g (12 oz) for an approximate height of 30 cm (12 in).

The sexes differ significantly in their plumage. The male is brighter, and its collar, lores, and underwing coverts are black In comparison, the female's plumage has paler and more cryptic coloration. The juvenile plumage is similar to the female, but has a finer mottling pattern. The main differences between the two subspecies is also in their plumage. In P. g. saturatior, the upperwing-coverts are brighter and cinnamon-coloured.

== Habitat and distribution ==
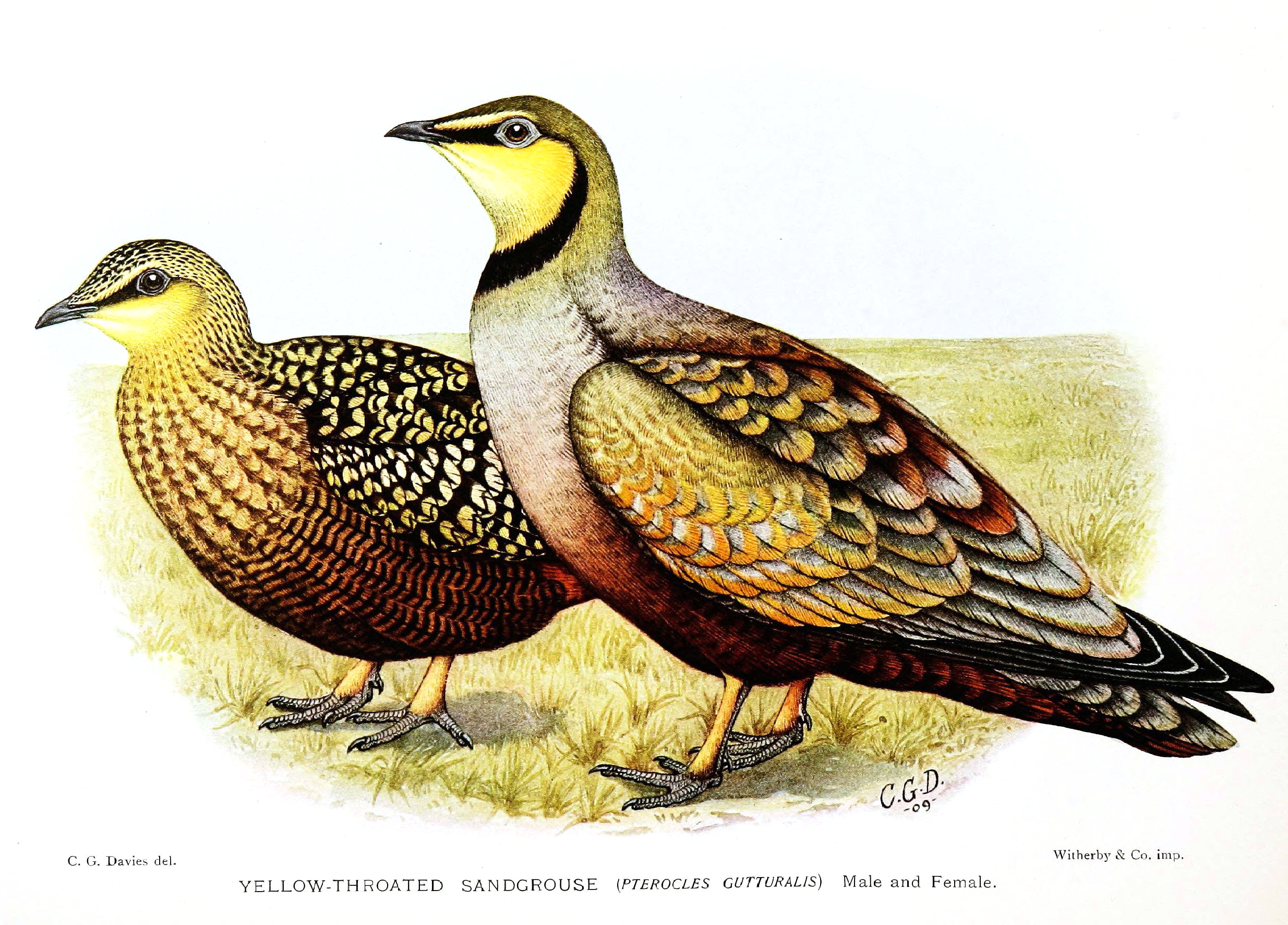
Illustration from Horsbrugh, Boyd (1912)

=== Habitat ===
The yellow-throated sandgrouse occurs in open grasslands, farmlands and edges of arid areas. It prefers clay-rich soils and avoids the coarser sandy or rocky soils formed from quartzite and granite.

=== Distribution ===
The species has a disjunct distribution that follows arid corridors. The subspecies P. g. gutturalis can be found in Angola, southern Zambia, western Zimbabwe, Namibia, Botswana and the north of South Africa. On the other hand, P. g. saturatior is present in Tanzania to northern Zambia and southern Ethiopia through Kenya. P. g. saturatior is mostly sedentary. The south African population is sedentary while the populations of Namibia and Botswana are migratory. P. g. gutturalis is mostly migratory as regional flood patterns forces them to move.

== Behaviour and ecology ==
=== Diet ===
The yellow throated sandgrouse is a ground-dwelling bird that primarily feeds on seeds. The south African population forages mainly in fallow fields and recently ploughed lands, and avoids fields with mature crops and close canopy. It feeds on grains of commercial crops such as oats, wheat, barley, sorghum, and soya-bean. Local populations heavily rely on agricultural activities and may be affected if farming practices changed or ceased.

=== Drinking Behaviour ===
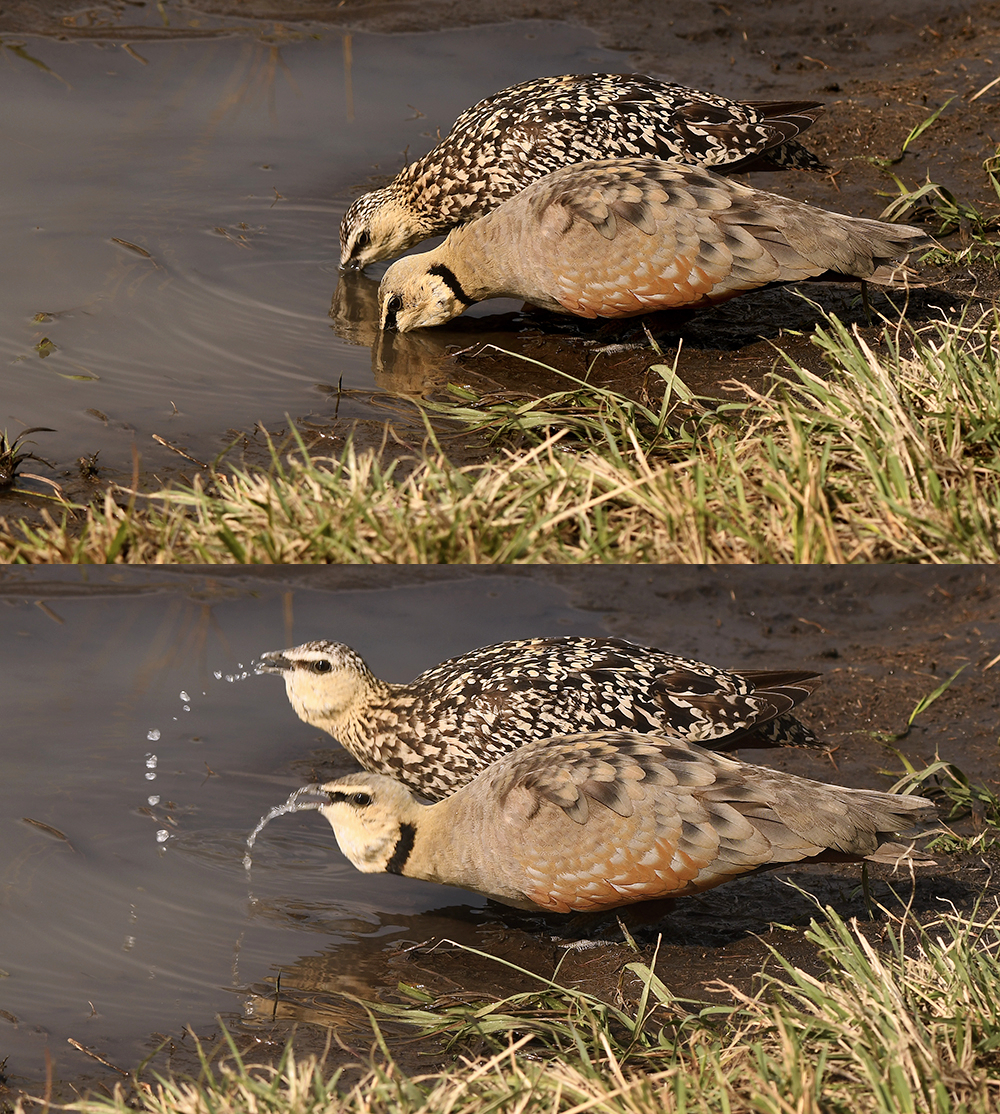
Pair drinking water

The species is an obligate drinker as it needs regular access to water bodies. To reduce predation risk, the species is highly gregarious and often forms flocks of hundreds at a single water site. It mainly flies to drinking spots at dawn or at dusk to avoid activity during the hottest time of the day. P. gutturalis prefers shallow water and open shoreline as it must walk in the water to drink. To drink, they immerse their bill, suck the water up, and lift their head to swallow. This method may allow the bird to remain alert to predation while drinking. Although factors such as cattle presence and changing water levels may influence drinking-site choice, the species shows unpredictable selection patterns.

=== Reproduction ===
The breeding season occurs from March to October. Although courtship behaviour has been reported in pairs of the subspecies P. g. gutturalis, behavioural descriptions on such rituals remains scarce and inconsistent compared to other sandgrouse species. To build their nest, the pair scrapes the soil and lines stems of weeds or dry grass. When they are available, the pairs will select a spot alongside vegetation cover. Nests of different pairs can be found 40-45 metres apart in the same field. Eggs are relatively small, reducing parental energy investment, and the length of the laying and incubation period (approximately 30 days). The eggshells have a reduced pore area which limits water loss in arid environments. The mean clutch size is 2.85 eggs, and the average productivity is estimated at 0.42–0.85 young/pair/year.

=== Water transport and parental care ===
The offsprings are precocial, have a cryptic plumage and can feed independently soon after hatching. However, parents must provide them with water once a day until juveniles reach 2 months old. For this purpose, the feathers of the adults are structurally modified to absorb and transport water. They have tightly coiled barbules (microscopic feather branches), and lack the hooked barbicels (tiny hooks that hold feathers together). When the modified feather absorbs water, the barbules loosen, and tiny filament tips rise to create a dense surface that can hold the liquid. Typically, males carry the water while the females remain dry for brooding. Females also have a lower water-carrying capacity because they have a smaller proportion of modified barbules. To loosen feathers and remove their water proofing capacity, the male often starts by rubbing his belly on the ground. Then, while drinking, he squats down in shallow water to soak his belly feathers. Sandgrouse usually nest within 10 km of water sources to reduce travel distances. Juveniles begin flying when they reach one-third of the adult size. They can only travel to drinking sites with their parents once they have attained adult body size.

== Conservation ==
There is no global population estimate for the yellow-throated sandgrouse. However, in South Africa, the population estimates declined from tens of thousands in 1999 to fewer than 1,000 mature individuals by 2015. Habitat degradation has contributed to a significant reduction in the population’s range. Since the population heavily depends on commercial farmland and access to water sources, recommended management actions include appropriate timing of ploughing and availability of fallow lands within the farming framework. Hunting of the yellow-throated sandgrouse is prohibited in the south African North West province. A formal management plan, assessment of potential threats (such as agricultural herbicides and habitat degradation), and regular population monitoring are required to ensure the population's long-term conservation.
