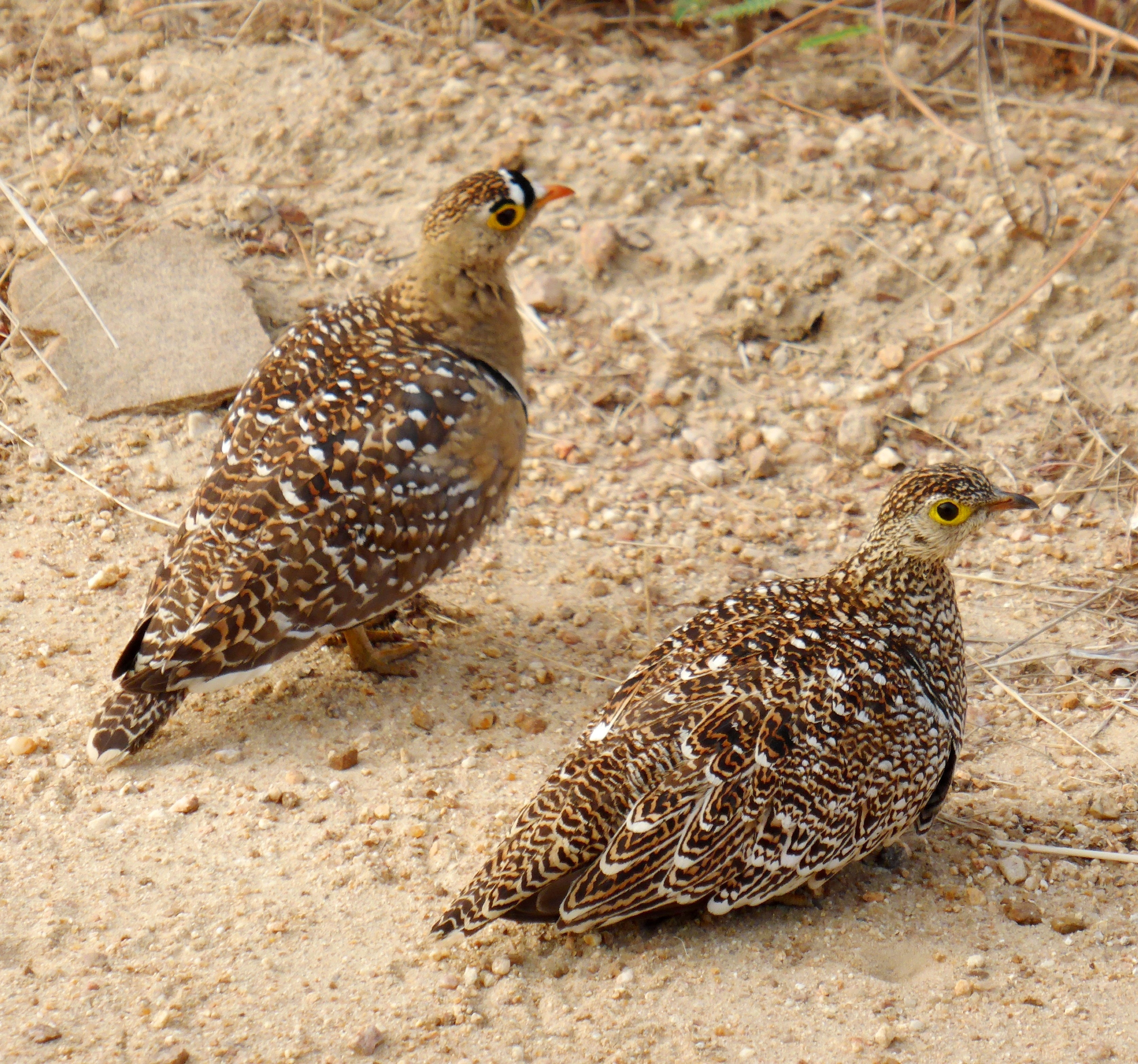
- female

Conservation status
- Least Concern (IUCN 3.1)

Scientific classification
- Kingdom: Animalia
- Phylum: Chordata
- Class: Aves
- Order: Pterocliformes
- Family: Pteroclidae
- Genus: Pterocles
- Species: P. bicinctus

Binomial name
- Pterocles bicinctus Temminck, 1815

= Double-banded sandgrouse =

- male

Species of bird

The double-banded sandgrouse (Pterocles bicinctus) is a species of predominantly terrestrial, or ground-dwelling (though not flightless), bird in the family Pteroclidae. It is found in arid parts of southern Africa.

== Subspecies ==
There are three subspecies: P. b. ansorgei is found in the southwest of Angola; P. b. bicinctus is found in Namibia, Botswana and the northwest of Cape Province, South Africa; P. b. multicolor is found in Zambia, Malawi, Mozambique and Transvaal. These sandgrouse have been observed in and around the Okavango Delta in Botswana.

== Description ==
A moderately-sized, quail-like bird with a plump body, the double-banded sandgrouse has a small, almost pigeon-like head with a long pair of wings and tail. The general colour of the plumage is light brown, with darker mottling and rows of whitish specks; the male is distinguished by having a conspicuous black-and-white band on his forehead, with a chestnut-coloured throat that is delineated by another black-and-white band. Both sexes have an area of bare, yellow skin surrounding their eyeball, and the male has an orange beak. The female is smaller and a more dull-brown in colour. The juveniles resemble the female.

== Distribution and habitat ==
The double-banded sandgrouse is found in Angola, Botswana, Malawi, Mozambique, Namibia, South Africa, Zambia and Zimbabwe. It has a preference for short trampled grass beside roads and tracks, gravel patches, tussocky grassland and recently burned areas of scrub with green shoots starting to develop. It is also seen in areas of scanty vegetation beneath scattered Terminalia sericea and Burkea africana trees and in scrubby mopane woodland. It is less common than Burchell's sandgrouse (Pterocles burchelli) and Namaqua sandgrouse (Pterocles namaqua), both of which have an overlapping distribution in southern Africa.

== Diet & Behavior ==
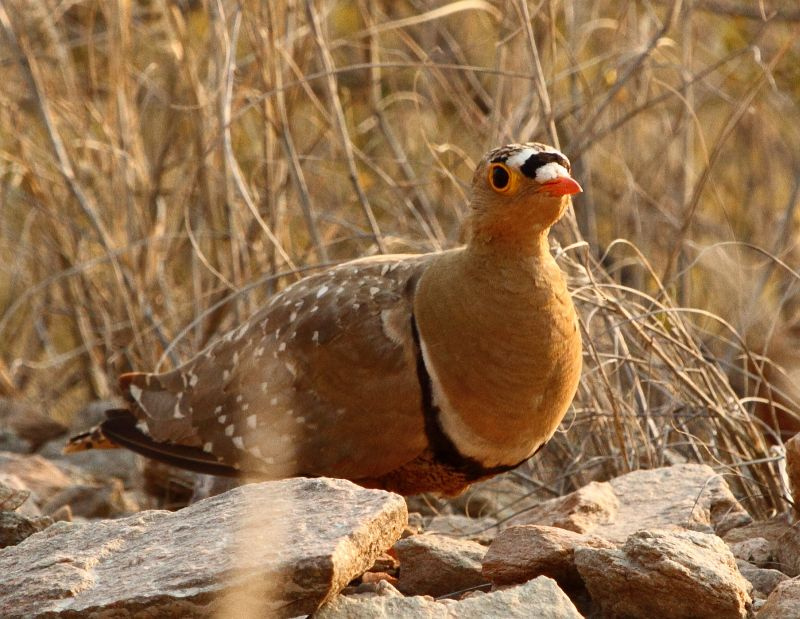
Male in South Africa

The diet consists largely of seeds including acacia, red pea (Requenia sphaerosperma), Tephrosia, Cyperus, blackjack (Bidens bidentata) and hairy thorn-apple (Datura innoxia).

Breeding takes place between February and September, peaking earlier in the northern part of the range than the south. The male has a courtship display in which he walks round in circles with his beak near the ground and his tail raised high. The nest is a shallow depression in the soil, lined with a few bits of dried vegetation, often hidden between grass tufts or under a bush. Two or three eggs are laid and both sexes take it in turn to incubate them. They hatch in about 24 days. The chicks are precocial, being active with eyes open and clothed in fluffy down as soon as they are hatched. In about a month they have grown adult-type feathers and can fly.

The double-banded sandgrouse is most often seen in groups of one to five birds, often two or four. The birds are monogamous and these are probably pairs or family units. In the morning they tend to feed in dry areas well away from water but in the afternoon they are most often seen near watering places. They visit water again, often in larger groups of up to 10, after dark. In Borakalalo Game Reserve, South Africa they were observed at dry times of year, in February and March and again between July and September. They were absent from the park during the wet summer period, from September to January.
