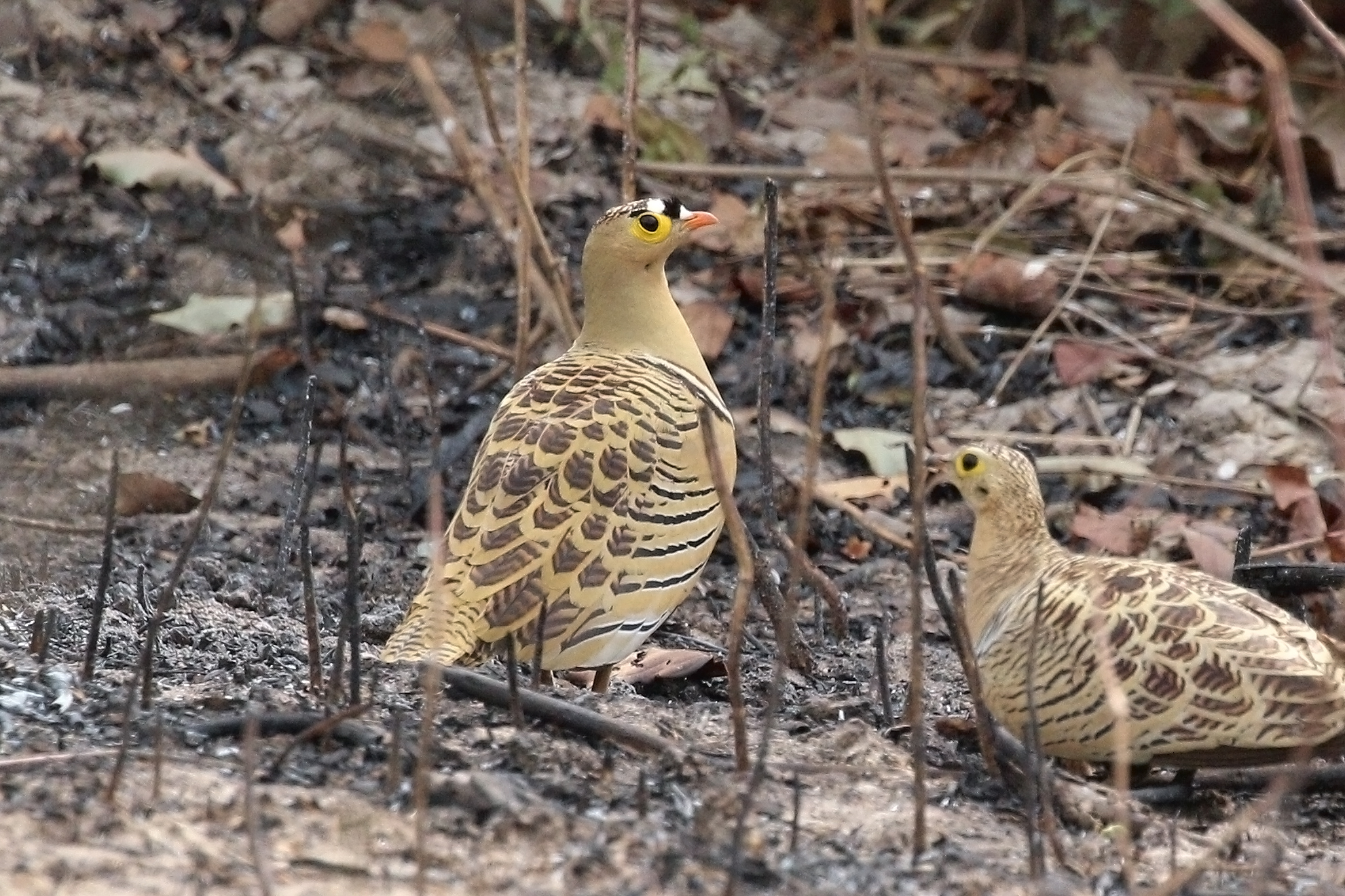
- Male
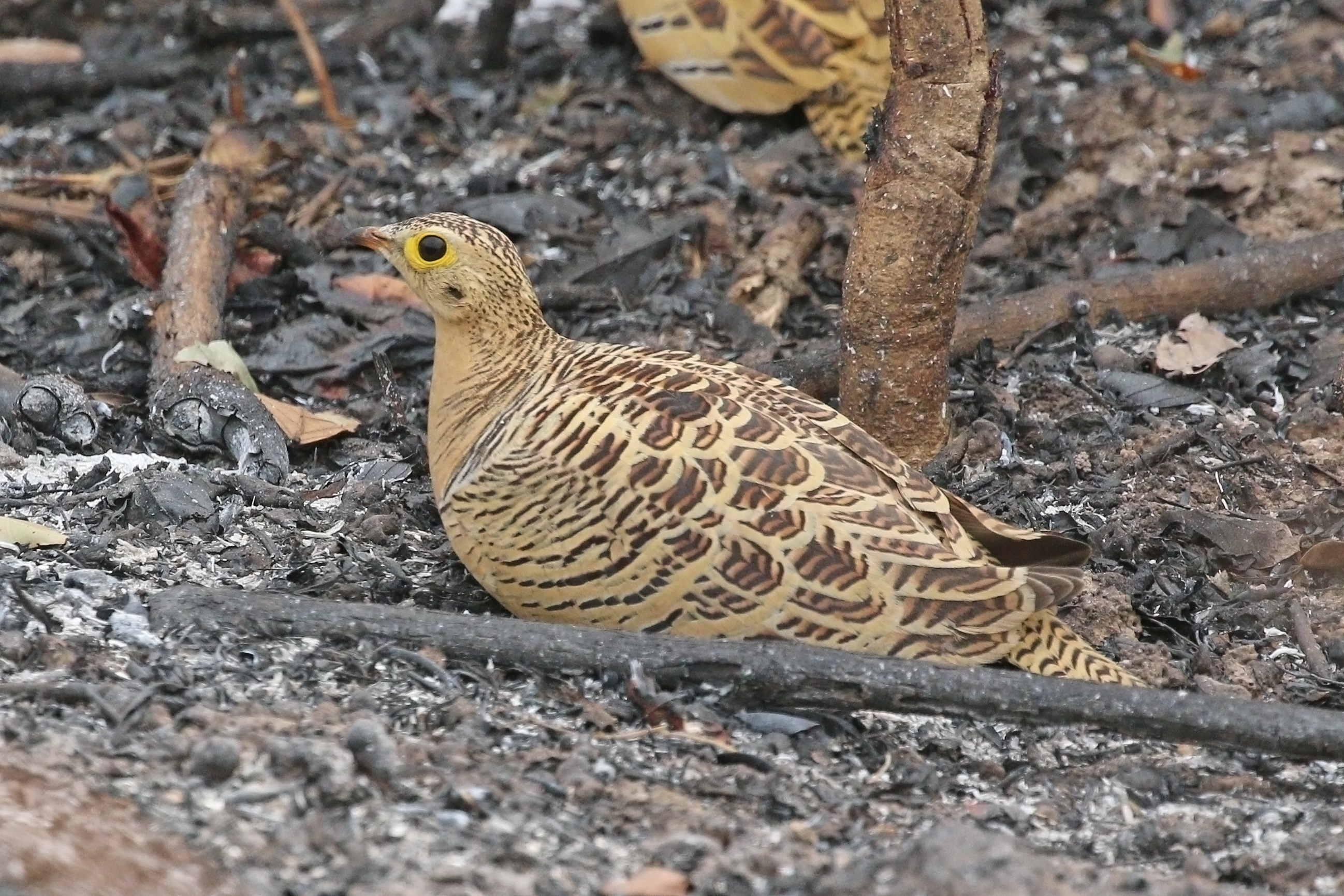
- Female; Both in Gambia

Conservation status
- Least Concern (IUCN 3.1)

Scientific classification
- Kingdom: Animalia
- Phylum: Chordata
- Class: Aves
- Order: Pterocliformes
- Family: Pteroclidae
- Genus: Pterocles
- Species: P. quadricinctus

Binomial name
- Pterocles quadricinctus Temminck, 1815

= Four-banded sandgrouse =

Species of bird

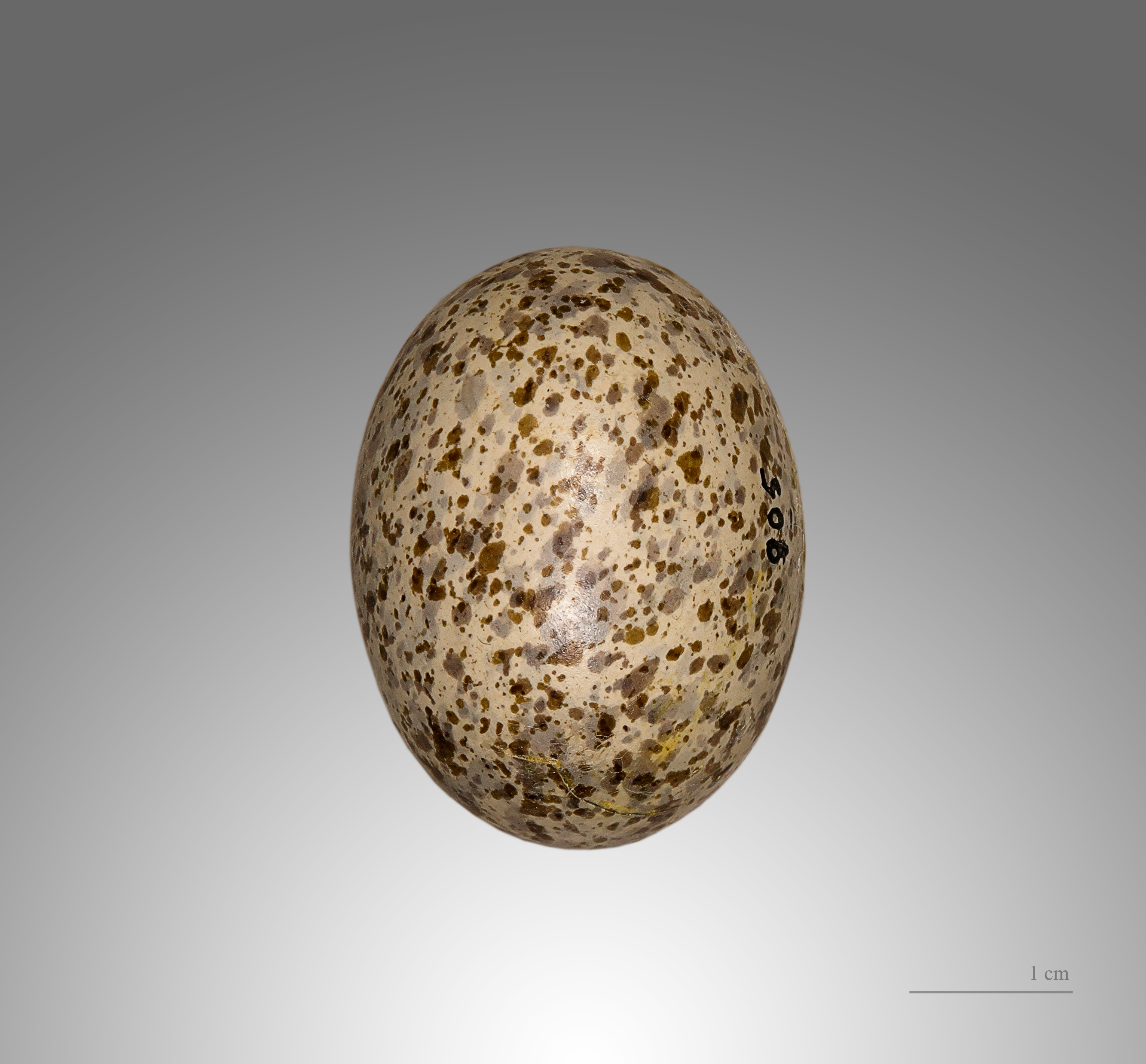
Pterocles quadricinctus - MHNT

The four-banded sandgrouse (Pterocles quadricinctus) is a medium-sized bird in the sandgrouse family.

== Description ==
The four-banded sandgrouse is 25–28 cm (9.8–11 in) long. Its head, neck and upperparts are yellowish-green, with the back heavily marked with brown. The male has black and white bands on its forehead as well as black and white bands separating the breast from the heavily barred belly. The female lacks the head and breast bands and is heavily barred on the back and flanks. It has a small, pigeon-like head and neck, but a sturdy compact body. It has long pointed wings, which are grey underneath, a short tail and a fast direct flight.

== Distribution and habitat ==
This gregarious species occurs in a belt across Africa from Mauritania and Cameroon east to Sudan and Uganda. It is much more common in the west of its range. It is a partial seasonal migrant, with some birds moving further north in the rainy season. It breeds on open areas with some trees, including savanna, scrubland and similar habitats.

== Behaviour ==
Flocks fly to watering holes in the evening to drink and are largely nocturnal. The call is a loud wulli-wulli, and there is much twittering at the drinking holes. The nest is a ground scrape into which 2 or 3 buff eggs with brown markings are laid. Both sexes incubate.
