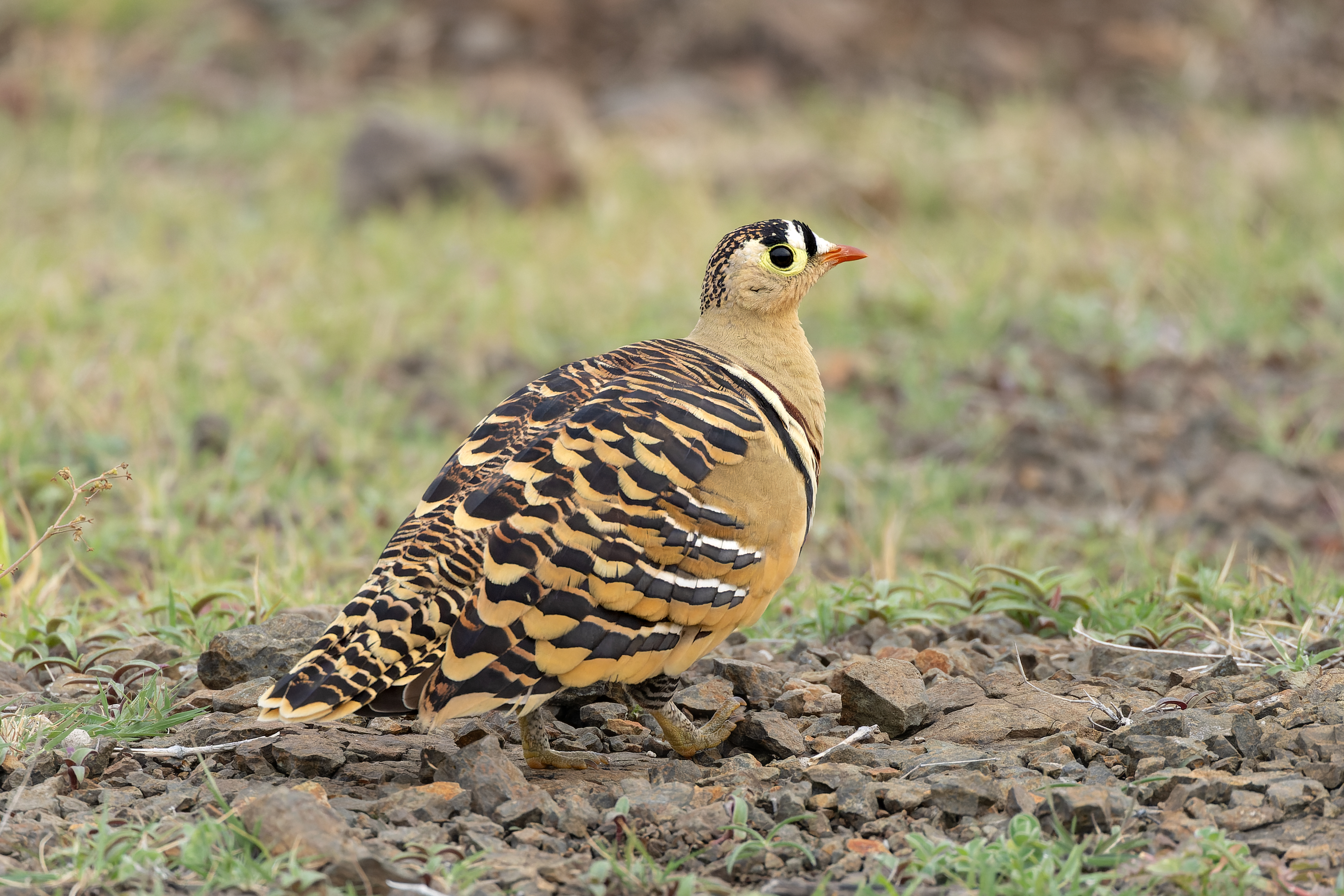
- male in Bhigwan, Maharashtra, India.
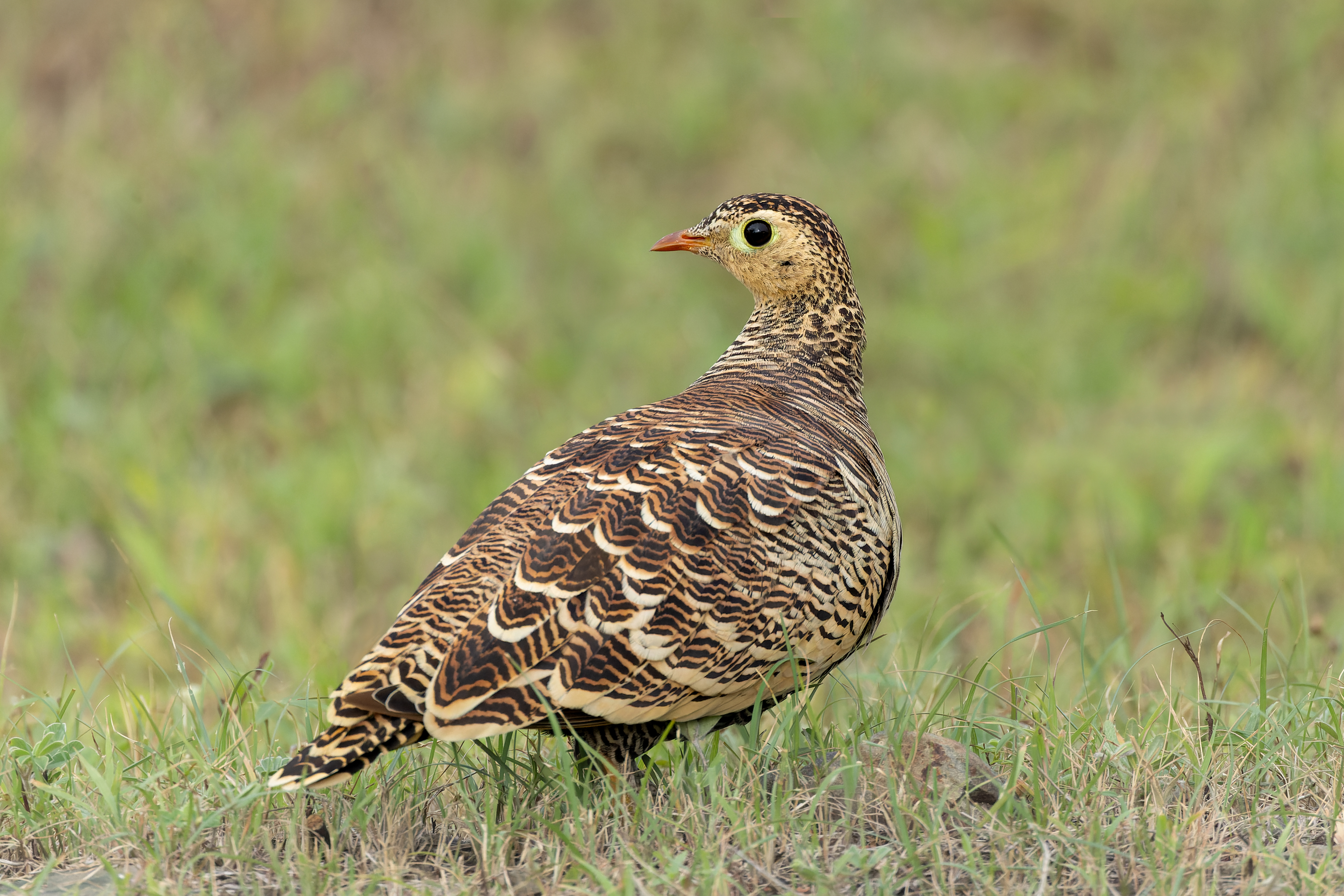
- female in Bhigwan, Maharashtra, India.

Conservation status
- Least Concern (IUCN 3.1)

Scientific classification
- Kingdom: Animalia
- Phylum: Chordata
- Class: Aves
- Order: Pterocliformes
- Family: Pteroclidae
- Genus: Pterocles
- Species: P. indicus

Binomial name
- Pterocles indicus (Gmelin, JF, 1789)

= Painted sandgrouse =

Species of bird

The painted sandgrouse (Pterocles indicus) is a medium large bird in the sandgrouse family Pteroclidae found in India and Pakistan.

== Taxonomy ==
The painted sandgrouse was formally described in 1789 by the German naturalist Johann Friedrich Gmelin in his revised and expanded edition of Carl Linnaeus's Systema Naturae. He placed it with all the other grouse-like birds in the genus Tetrao and coined the binomial name Tetrao indicus. Gmelin based his description on "La gélinote des Indes" from the Coromandel Coast that had been described and illustrated in 1782 by the French naturalist Pierre Sonnerat. The painted sandgrouse is now placed with 13 other species in genus Pterocles that was introduced in 1815 by the Dutch zoologist Coenraad Jacob Temminck. The genus name combines the Ancient Greek pteron meaning "wing" with -klēs meaning "notable" or "splendid". The specific epithet indicus is Latin for "Indian". The species is monotypic: no subspecies are recognised.

== Description ==
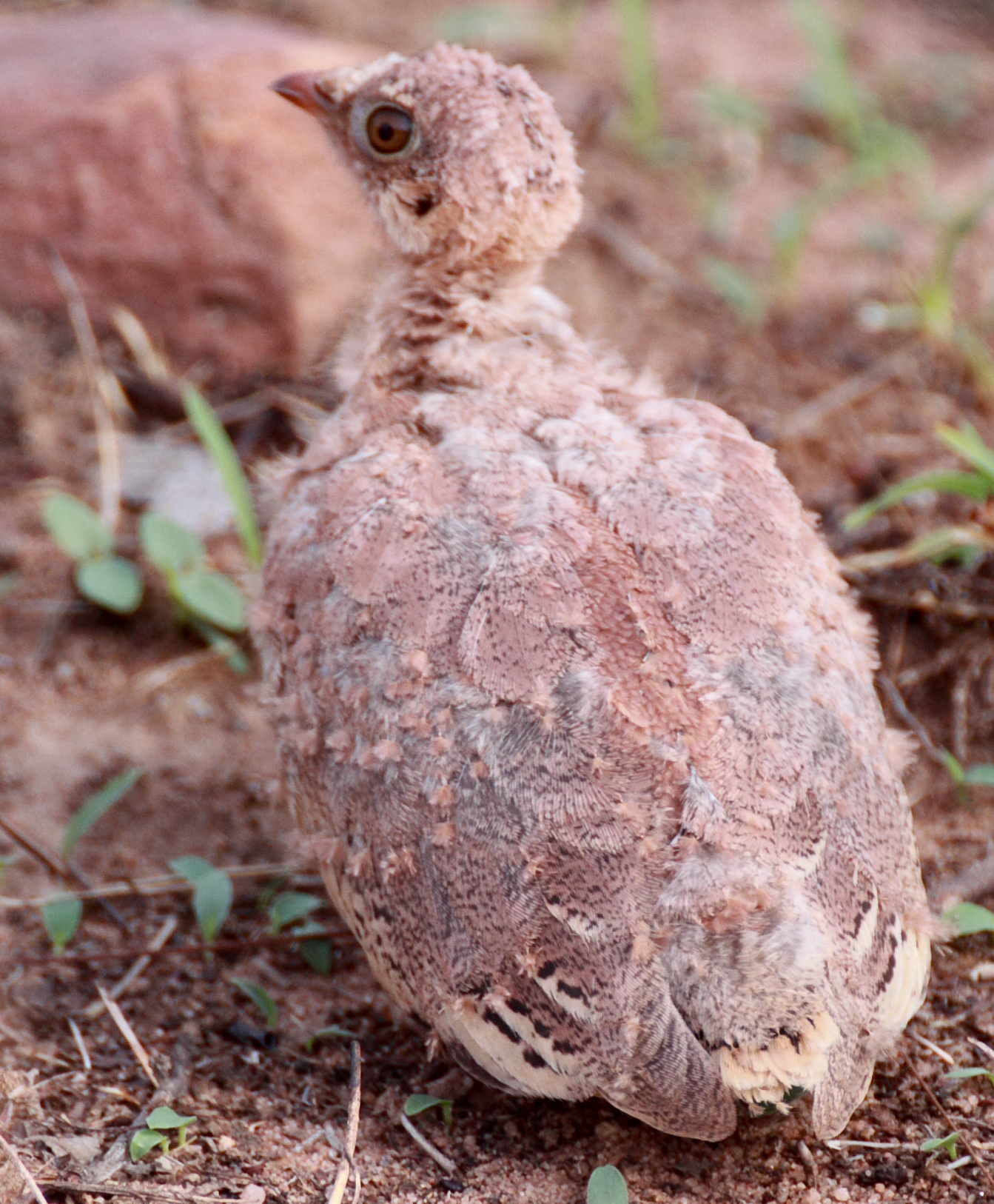
Chick

The painted sandgrouse is a plump ground-dwelling bird with a small head and short legs. The sexes are differently coloured. In the male, the bill is orange and there is a black bar across the white forehead, fine black longitudinal lines on the nape and a white patch of bare skin surrounding the eye. There is a broad black and white band around the chest. The breast and belly are a uniform pinkish-brown colour and the back, wings and tail are brown, boldly marked in black and white transverse bars. The female is duller in appearance being a greyish brown colour, barred and speckled with darker brown and white.

== Behaviour ==
The painted sandgrouse is found in dry regions in rough grassland, rocky areas and scrub and feeds mainly on seeds. It is gregarious and groups congregate at waterholes to drink.

== See also ==
- List of birds of Bangladesh
