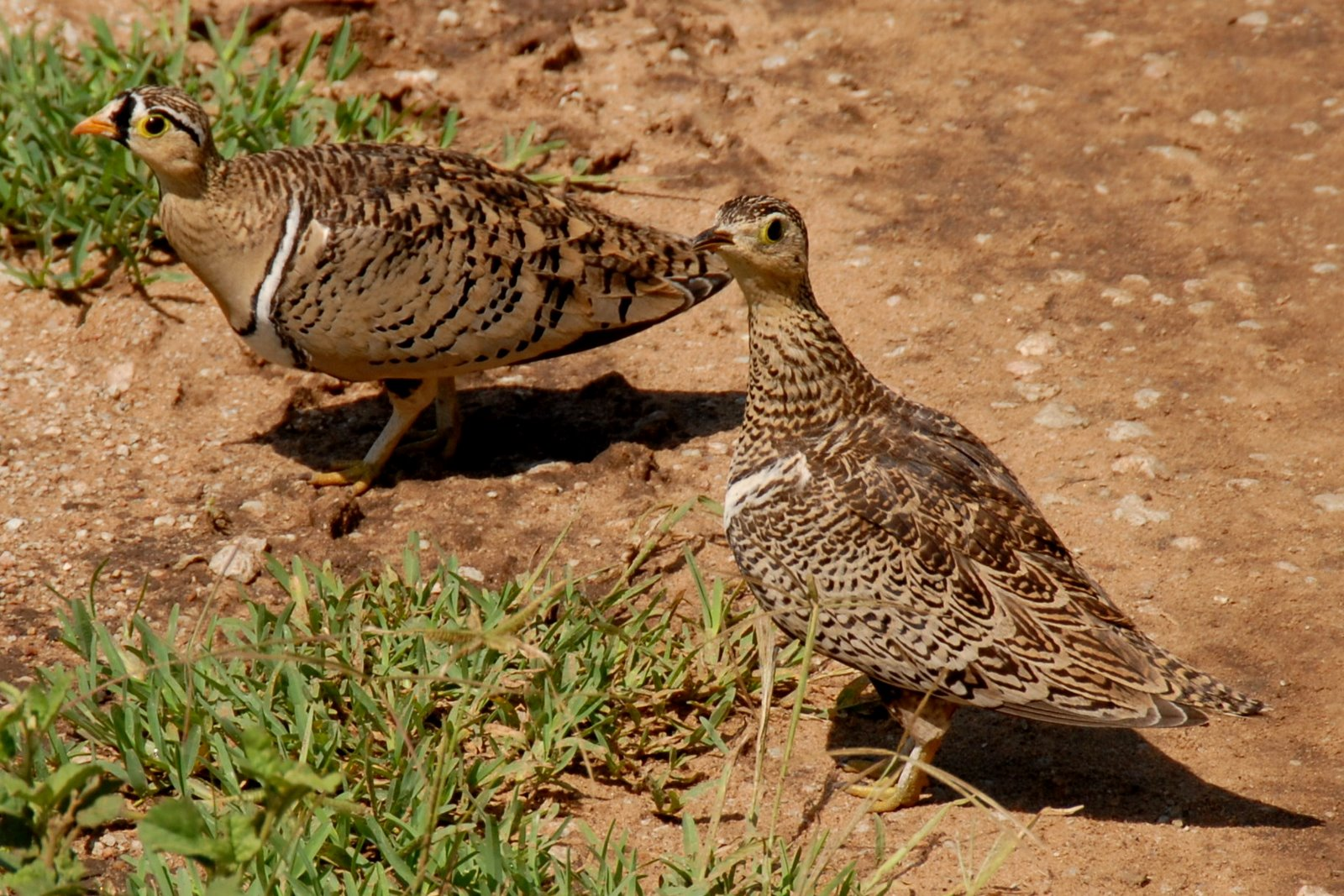
- A pair at Serengeti National Park, Tanzania

Conservation status
- Least Concern (IUCN 3.1)

Scientific classification
- Kingdom: Animalia
- Phylum: Chordata
- Class: Aves
- Order: Pterocliformes
- Family: Pteroclidae
- Genus: Pterocles
- Species: P. decoratus

Binomial name
- Pterocles decoratus Cabanis, 1868

= Black-faced sandgrouse =

Species of bird

The black-faced sandgrouse (Pterocles decoratus) is a species of ground-dwelling bird in the Pteroclidae family. It is a mainly sedentary bird found in East Africa, ranging from Ethiopia, Kenya, Somalia, Tanzania, and Uganda. It is a medium-sized bird which is well-adapted and well-camouflaged to life in arid environments. It is a dove-like bird due to its physical resemblance, particularly its small head, short legs, and pointed wings. It is listed as least concern on the IUCN Red List.

== Description ==
The black-faced sandgrouse is a medium-sized bird approximately 28 cm (11 in) long and weighing between 140 and 210 g (4.9 and 7.4 oz). Overall, it has a small and compact body, with a short tail, pointed wings, as well as short and feathered legs. The wing tips are black when in flight.

As its name suggests, the male is easily recognizable with black face markings extending from the forehead down to the throat. The male is also characterized by a black and a white eyebrow stripe above the eye, a pinkish-orange bill, and a yellow eye-ring contrasting against its black facial colour. The chest is a pale brown with a thin bold black stripe followed by a thick white stripe on the breast, and a dark belly.

The female black-faced sandgrouse does not have a black mask like its male counterpart. Its face is a pale brown with a white eyebrow above the eye, a yellow eye-ring, and a greyish bill. The body is overall a pale brown with a barred and streaked chest, wings, and back in a blackish colour. The belly is dark like the male. The black and white breast stripe in the male is also present on the female. The female black-faced sandgrouse can be mistaken for other sandgrouse species, but is distinguishable by its small size and white breast mark.

Juveniles resemble the females, except with darker barring on the back.

== Taxonomy ==
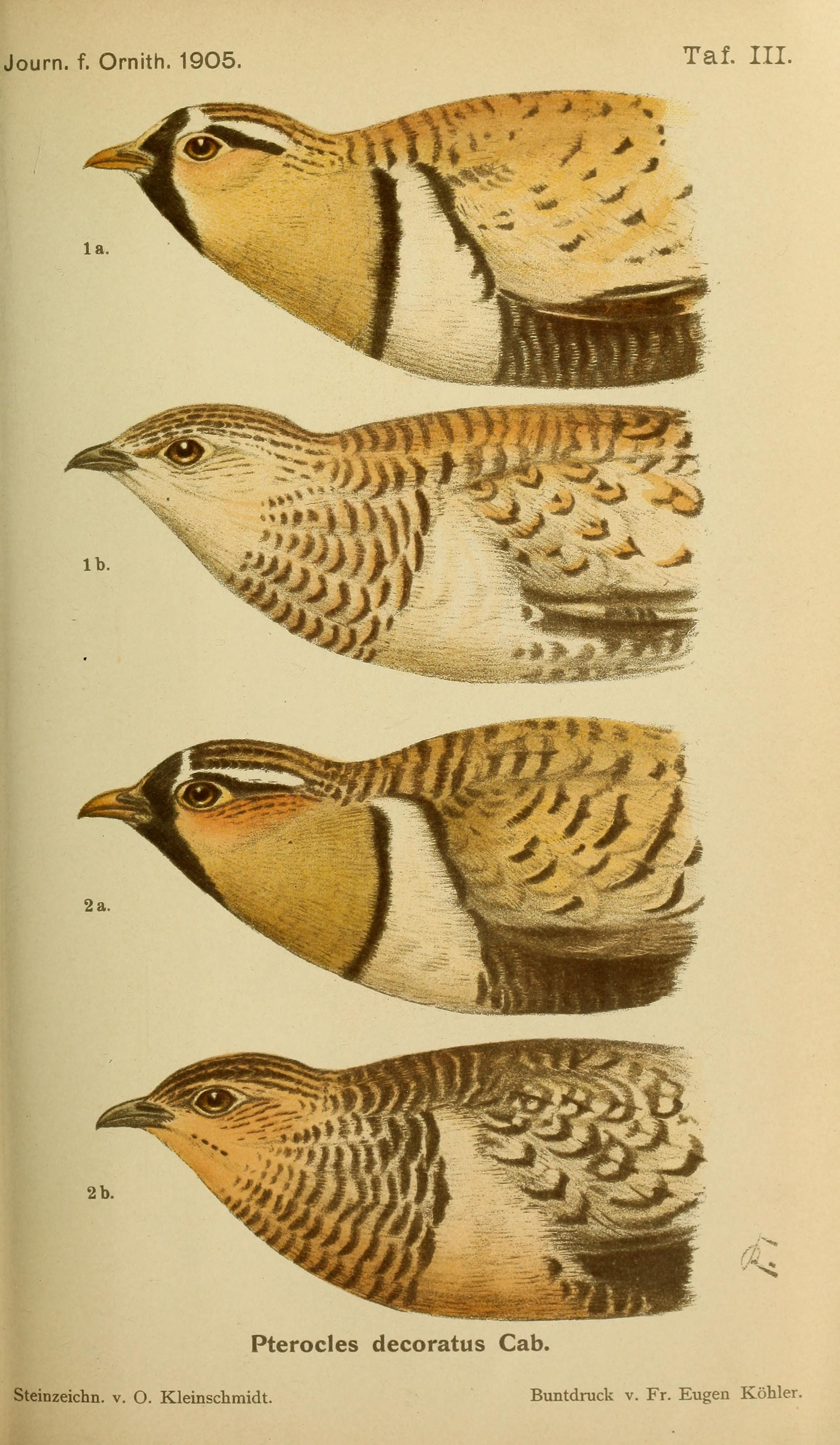
P. d. ellenbecki ♂,♀ P. d. decoratus ♂,♀ Journal für Ornithologie

The black-faced sandgrouse was first described by German ornithologist Jean Cabanis in 1868. It possibly forms a clade with P. bicinctus, P. quadricinctus, P. lichtensteinii and P. indicus. P. decoratus was formerly thought to be related to P. coronatus and P. personatus.

=== Subspecies ===
There are three subspecies:

- Pterocles decoratus decorates – Cabanis, 1868. SE Kenya and E Tanzania
- Pterocles decoratus ellenbecki – Erlanger, 1905. NE Uganda and N Kenya, SE Ethiopia and S Somalia
- Pterocles decoratus loveridgei – Friedmann, 1928. W Kenya and W Tanzania

The three subspecies vary by tone of overall coloration. N P.d. ellenbecki and P. d. loveridgei in SW Kenya are lighter in colour than the main species. Eremialector used to be another genus in the Pteroclidae family, however, it has been grouped together with the genus Pterocles. The species Eremialector decoratus loveridgei is now known as the subspecies Pterocles decoratus loveridgei. A population in N Tanzania was classified as a separate subspecies katharinae, but is now considered the same as loveridgei.

== Habitat and distribution ==
The species is found in East Africa, in the dry zones of Ethiopia, Kenya, Tanzania, Uganda and Somalia. It is frequent in Ethiopia, common and widespread in S Somalia, and locally common in Kenya.

The black-faced sandgrouse inhabits dry, open environments typical of East Africa's savanna landscape. The species lives in dry savanna, bushveld, semi-desert scrub and is occasionally found in dense thornbush, especially in open spaces such as roadsides. It ranges from sea level to 1,600 m in altitude.

== Behaviour ==
The black-faced sandgrouse is a mainly sedentary bird that does not migrate. It is less social than other sandgrouse species but will gather in flocks at waterholes in the early morning, often with the chestnut-bellied sandgrouse (Pterocles exustus). Several species in Kenya have been observed to be eaten by crocodiles while visiting waterholes to drink water.

Sandgrouse species living in arid environments have modified abdominal feathers, allowing them to soak up water. The male will fly long distances, carrying the water in its feathers to bring back to the nest to cool the eggs or give water to the chicks.

The species is rarely observed bathing in water. Instead, it cleans itself by dust bathing. A sandgrouse will make a hollow depression in the sandy soil and turn on its sides or even roll to spread dust into its plumage. The dust bath maintains its feathers by getting rid of parasites and excess preen oil. The bird will dust bathe before and after getting water, as it dries the feathers.

=== Diet ===
Sandgrouse are known seed-eaters. The black-faced sandgrouse's diet primarily consists of seeds from leguminous plants such as Indigofera and Trianthema, as well as Boraginaceae plants such as Heliotropium. It will drink water in the first half of the morning.

=== Reproduction ===
Sandgrouse are monogamous birds. The breeding season of sandgrouse which live in semi-arid tropics correlates with rainfall, thus the true extent or timing at which the breeding season will occur is highly unpredictable. In Kenya, there are two main breeding seasons which occur in January–March overlapping with the 'short hot' dry period as well as in July–October coinciding with the 'long cool' dry season. It is also known that the black-faced sandgrouse will breed when seeds are most available. The individuals will breed four to six months after rainfall as seeds are at its most plentiful. In Tanzania, breeding occurs from May–November/December, with a peak in breeding during dry season in June–August.

Its reproductive organs are known to increase largely in size during breeding season, despite the scarcity of the breeding patterns. Females incubate in the day and males takeover at night, thus having less time allotted to foraging and a higher water deficit during incubation. Therefore, incubating females will visit waterholes more frequently than males. However, once the chicks have hatched, males spend more time watching over the young, which reduces their available foraging time.

The sandgrouse will make an unlined scrape nest which is when they create a small depression in the soil by scrapping the sand away. The female lay 2-3 eggs and once they hatch, the chicks are a sandy or golden colour with grey and black streaking.

=== Vocalization ===
The flight call is similar to a dove's and is a rhythmic, three-note sound described as 'what-wa-wha'. During take-off and flight, it has a short, high, whistling note 'wheeeuw' about 0.4 seconds long, within a 2–4 kHz range or a low-pitch 'chut-to-la'. Another vocalization is in a series of triple-noted whistling chucking 'chuker-chuker-chuker'. It also has a series of shorter, lower notes 'quick-quick-quick'.
