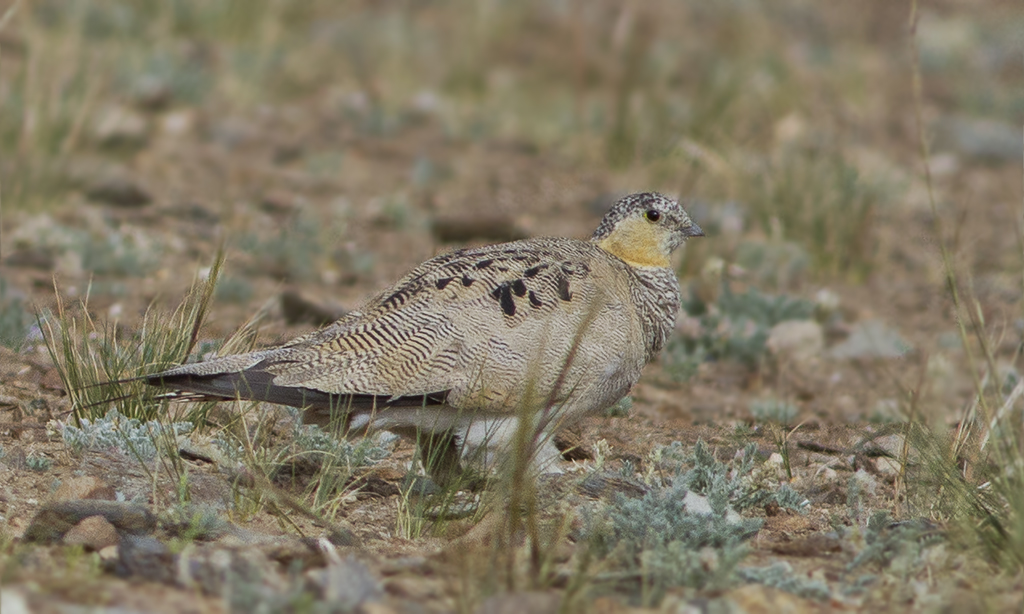
- Female Tibetan sandgrouse. Photograph was taken at Tso Kar, Ladakh, India.

Conservation status
- Least Concern (IUCN 3.1)

Scientific classification
- Kingdom: Animalia
- Phylum: Chordata
- Class: Aves
- Order: Pterocliformes
- Family: Pteroclidae
- Genus: Syrrhaptes
- Species: S. tibetanus

Binomial name
- Syrrhaptes tibetanus Gould, 1850

= Tibetan sandgrouse =

Species of bird

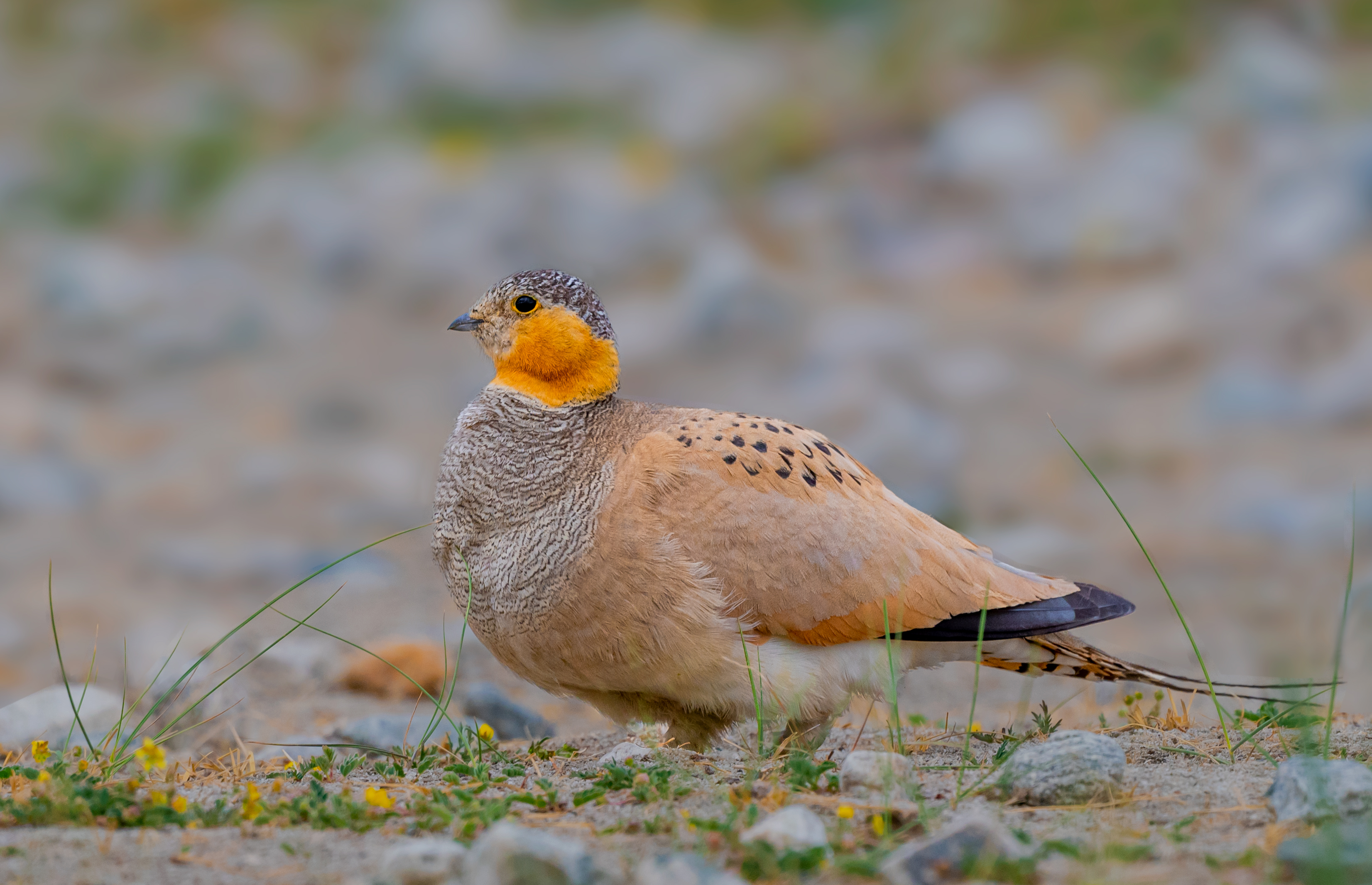
At Merak, Ladakh

The Tibetan sandgrouse (Syrrhaptes tibetanus) is a large bird in the sandgrouse family. The genus name Syrrhaptes is from Ancient Greek surrhaptos, "sewn together" (the feathered toes of this sandgrouse are fused together) and tibetanus is from the type locality, Tibet.

== Description ==
The Tibetan sandgrouse is about 30–41 cm (12–16 in) long, with a small, pigeon-like head and neck, but sturdy compact body. It has long pointed wings and pin tail. It has an orange face, finely barred grey breast, neck and crown, white belly and black underwings. Male has unspotted buff wing while the female has barred wing coverts, upperparts and upper belly than the male. Juvenile lacks the tail pin, has narrower barrings and has less orange on the face. White belly and dark underwings are distinctions from the related Pallas's sandgrouse, with which its range overlaps. As with that species, its small feet lack a hind toe, and the three front toes are fused together. The upper surface is feathered, and the underneath has a fleshy pad. The appearance of the foot is more like a paw than an avian foot.

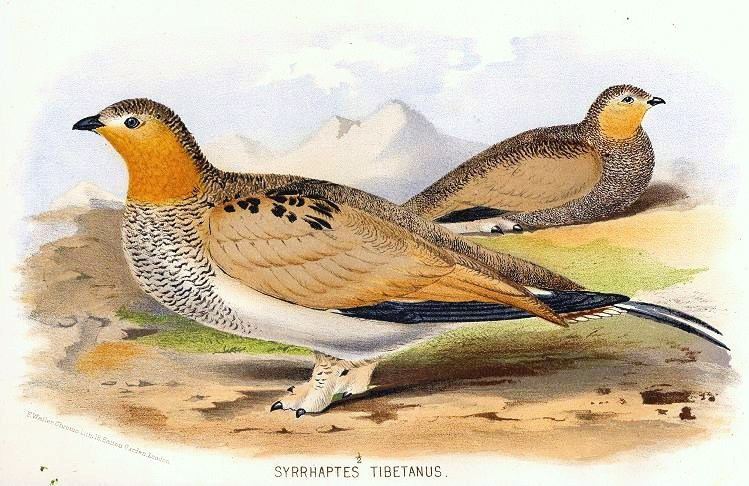

== Taxonomy and systematics ==
Currently considered monotypic. Birds from the Pamirs were earlier separated as race pamirensis. The species was first described by Gould in 1850 based on specimen from Tso-Morriri in Ladakh.

== Distribution and status ==
Tibetan sandgrouse is found in mountains ranges of Central Asia, Tibet, Central China and the Himalayas. Though the population is decreasing, due to the large range and low rate of population decrease, the species is classified as "Least Concern" by IUCN.

== Behaviour and ecology ==
Tibetan sandgrouse is found on barren sandy plains near water. They are gregarious and form loose flocks. Their flight is fast and direct and on the wings, a clanging double note is uttered repeatedly. Flocks fly noisily to watering holes at dawn and dusk, usually the former, though less regular than other sandgrouse. They forage in the morning and afternoon on the undulating semi-desert plains. While foraging, their movements are fast and rapid. During the middle of the day it squats in a small depression in the ground, basking in the sun. They are generally not wary, especially in the middle of the day during resting.

This species breeds from May to June on the arid stony plateau and ridges, the nest site generally chosen near the top of the ridge on the leeward side. Its nest is a ground scrape in which three pale brown elliptical eggs with cryptic markings are laid. Generally the nest is exposed, though occasionally could be protected by a stone or grass. The young ones are able to move around soon after hatching. They move around with the flock. When threatened, adults resort to distraction displays, while the chicks crouch and freeze.

They feed on seeds, grass, buds and legumes.
