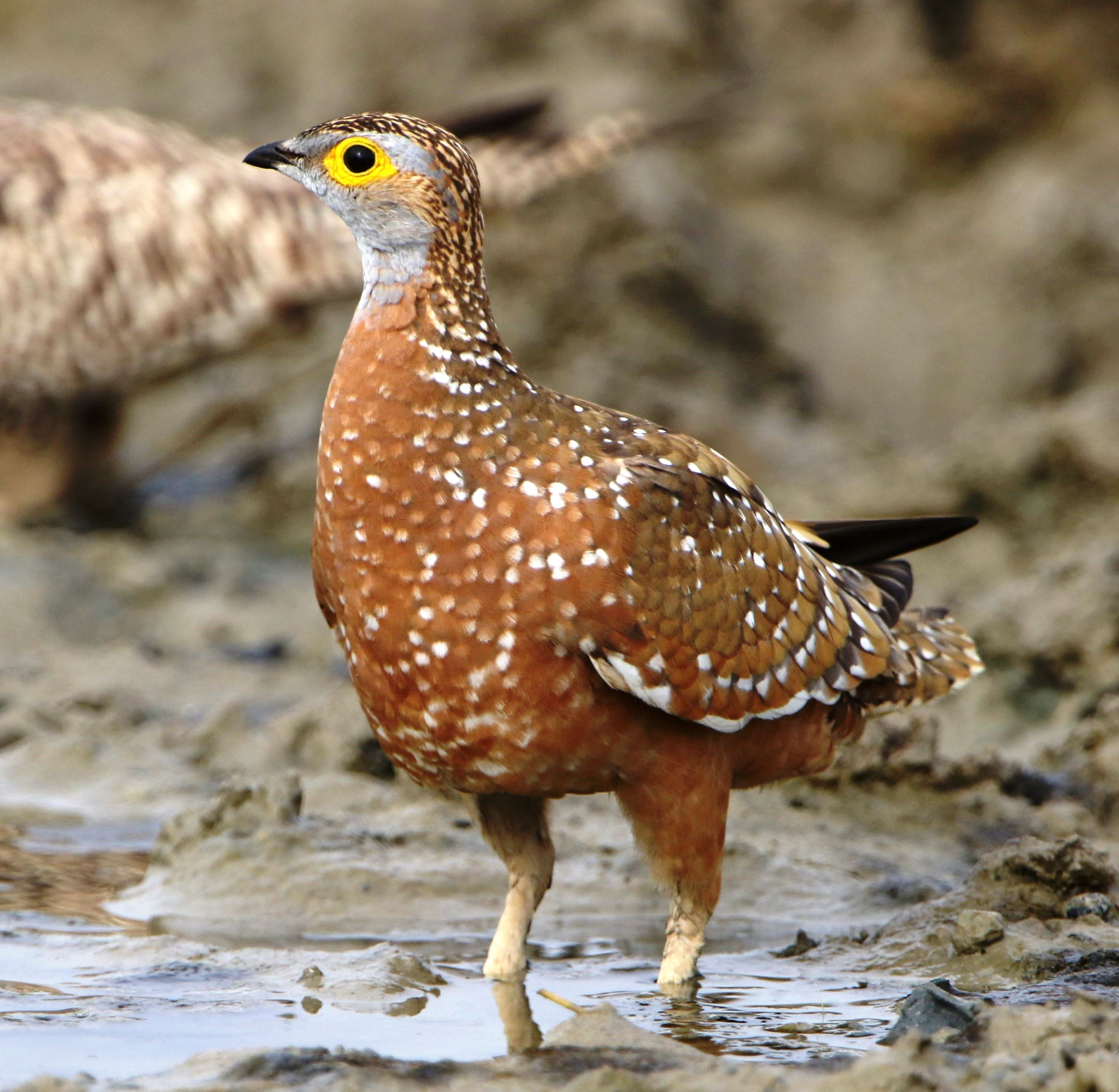
- Male
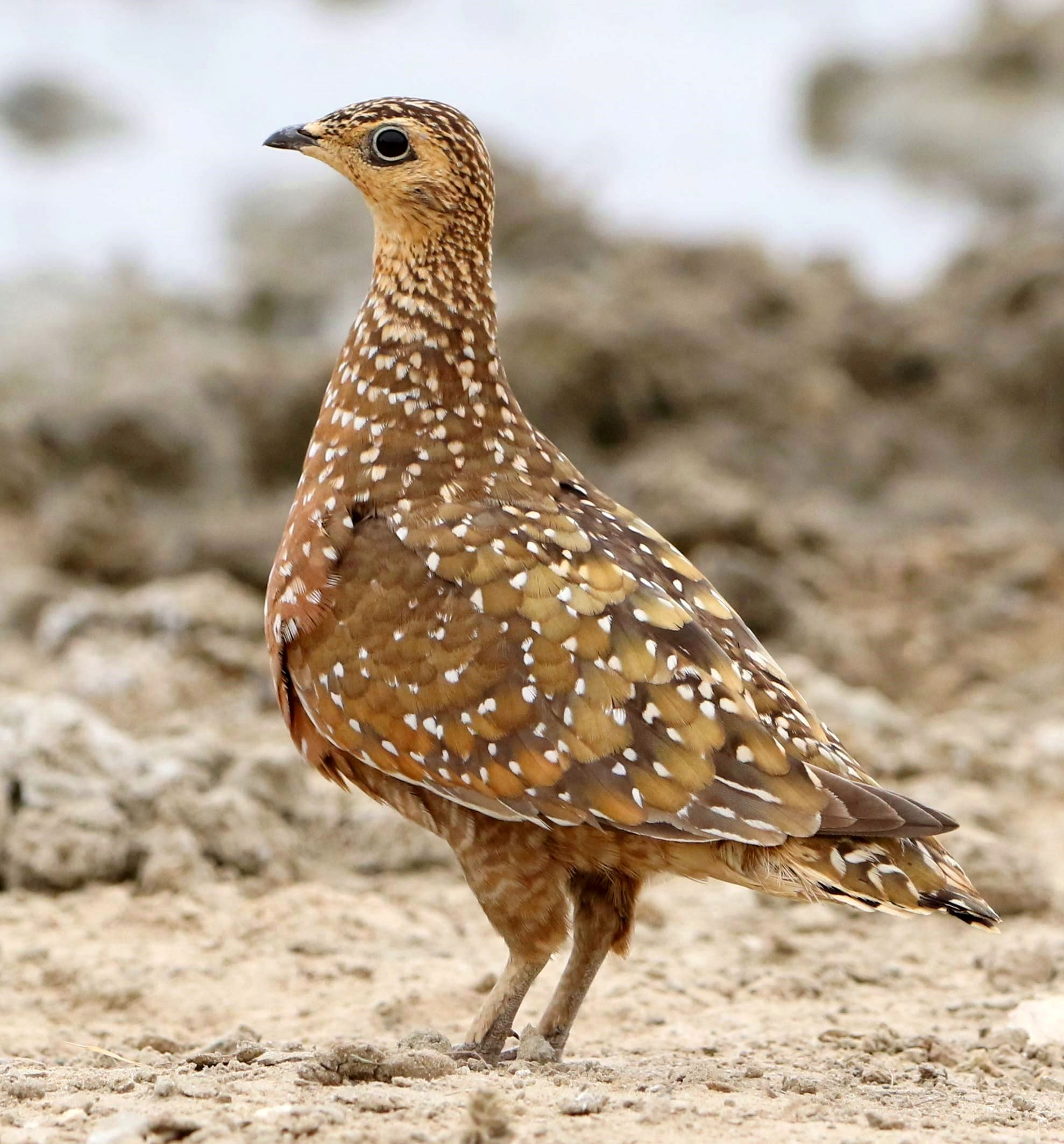
- Female

Conservation status
- Least Concern (IUCN 3.1)

Scientific classification
- Kingdom: Animalia
- Phylum: Chordata
- Class: Aves
- Order: Pterocliformes
- Family: Pteroclidae
- Genus: Pterocles
- Species: P. burchelli

Binomial name
- Pterocles burchelli Sclater, WL, 1922

= Burchell's sandgrouse =

Species of bird

Burchell's sandgrouse (Pterocles burchelli) is a species of bird in the family Pteroclidae. It is found in arid and semi-arid regions of southern Africa. The name of this bird commemorates the English naturalist William John Burchell.

== Description ==
Burchell's sandgrouse is a plump bird about the size of a pigeon with a small head and short legs. The body is light brown, mottled with darker shades and white speckles. In males, the eye is surrounded by bare yellow skin and the cheeks and throat are pale grey. The male grows to about 25 cm (10 in) long and the female is a little smaller.

Burchell's sandgrouse is limited by water availability, like many species residing in desert environments. Adult sandgrouse increase gular fluttering and panting for evaporative cooling when approaching the upper critical limit of their thermal neutral zone around 43.8°C. Another adaptation that adult Burchell's sandgrouse have developed is the transport of water in body feathers from a water source back to the nest to water their chicks. Upon arriving at a water source, adult Burchell's sandgrouse first rub their bellies on dry ground to ruffle up their belly feathers, increasing the amount of water the feathers can hold. They then wade into the water and bob up and down to soak up the water in their belly feathers. Males have been observed to hold an average of 22 ml of water, while females can carry an average of 9 ml. Once the water is gathered, Burchell's sandgrouse fly back to the nest and allow their chicks to drink water from their belly feathers.

== Distribution and habitat ==
Burchell's sandgrouse is found in Angola, Namibia, Botswana, Zambia, Zimbabwe, and South Africa. It is widespread and common in much of its range. It is normally resident but moves about to a limited extent depending on the availability of water and the seeds it mainly eats. It frequents areas of rough grass and scrub, especially on red Kalahari sand and has been able to extend its range because of the greater availability of water after the sinking of boreholes by farmers.

== Breeding ==
Burchell's sandgrouse is monogamous and breeds during the dry season between April and October. The nest is formed in a shallow depression in the ground often concealed among grass tussocks or under a bush. It is lined with a few fragments of dry vegetation and two or usually three eggs are laid. Both parents incubate the eggs and the chicks are precocial when they hatch, covered in down and soon able to run after the adult birds. Both parents care for the young and, as in other sandgrouse species, water is brought to them absorbed in the specially adapted feathers that line the parents' breasts.
