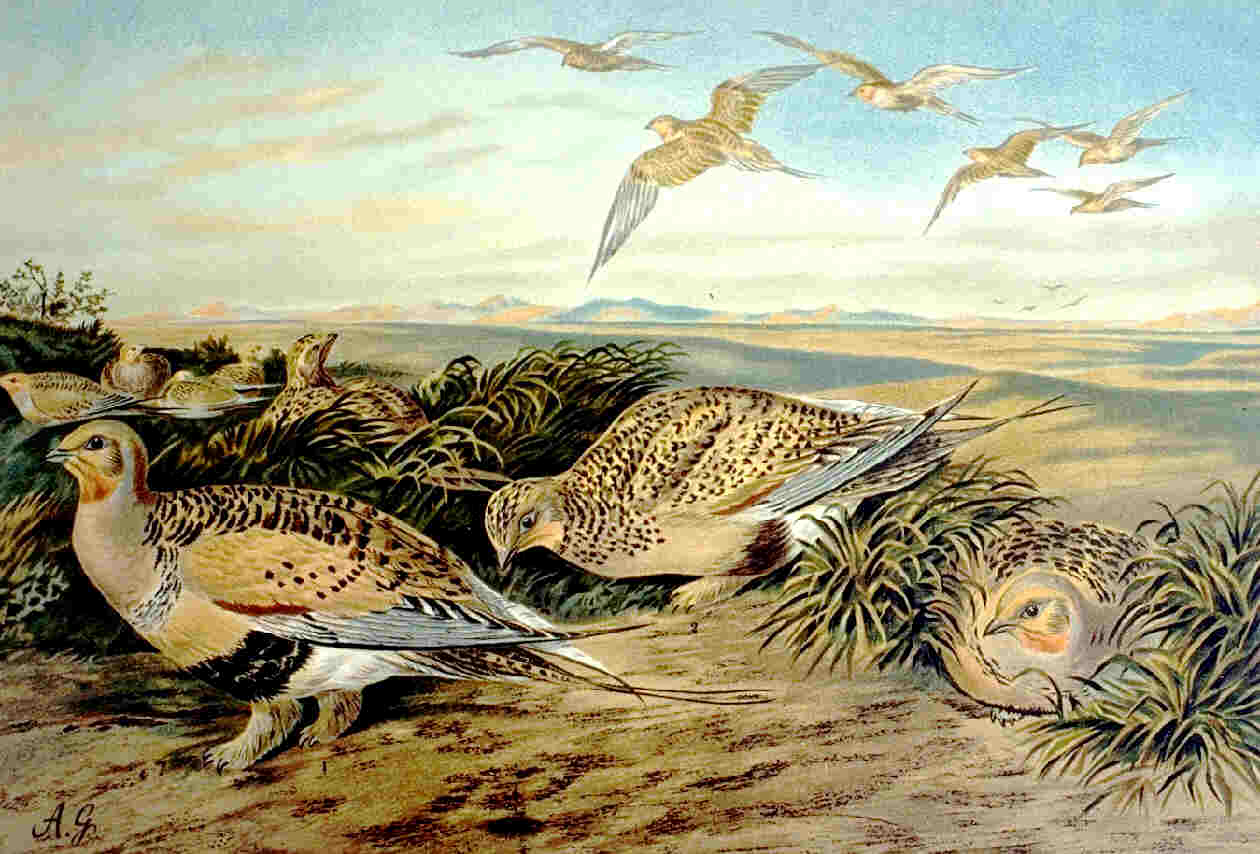
- Pallas's sandgrouse

Scientific classification
- Kingdom: Animalia
- Phylum: Chordata
- Class: Aves
- Order: Pterocliformes
- Family: Pteroclidae
- Genus: Syrrhaptes; Illiger, 1811

Type species
- Tetrao paradoxa Pallas, 1773

= Syrrhaptes =

Genus of birds

Syrrhaptes is a genus of birds in the sandgrouse family. The genus name is from Ancient Greek surrhaptos, "sewn together"; the feathered toes of birds in this genus are fused together.

There are two central Asian species.

Genus Syrrhaptes – Illiger, 1811 – two species
Common name	Scientific name and subspecies	Range	Size and ecology	IUCN status and estimated population
Tibetan sandgrouse	Syrrhaptes tibetanus Gould, 1850	mountains ranges of Central Asia, Tibet, Central China and the Himalayas	Size: Habitat: Diet:	LC
Pallas's sandgrouse	Syrrhaptes paradoxus (Pallas, 1773)	Kazakhstan, Mongolia, across Europe as far west as Great Britain	Size: Habitat: Diet:	LC

These are large birds breeding in open steppes or plateau. They nest in a ground scrape into which three eggs are laid.

Both species have mainly buff upperparts, an orange face and feathered legs and toes. They are smaller-headed than other sandgrouse, but have sturdy compact bodies.

The small feet lack a hind toe, and the three front toes are fused together. The upper surface is feathered, and the underneath has a fleshy pad. The appearance of the foot is more like a paw than an avian foot.

Although there is range overlap, they are easily distinguished. Tibetan sandgrouse has a white belly and black underwings, whereas Pallas's has a black belly and white underwings.

These birds are gregarious like other sandgrouse. Flocks fly to watering holes at dawn and dusk, on long pointed wings.
