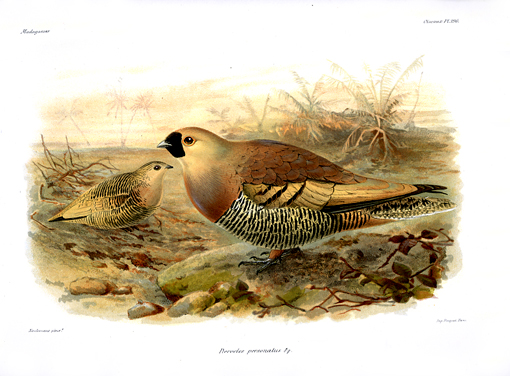
- Illustration of male
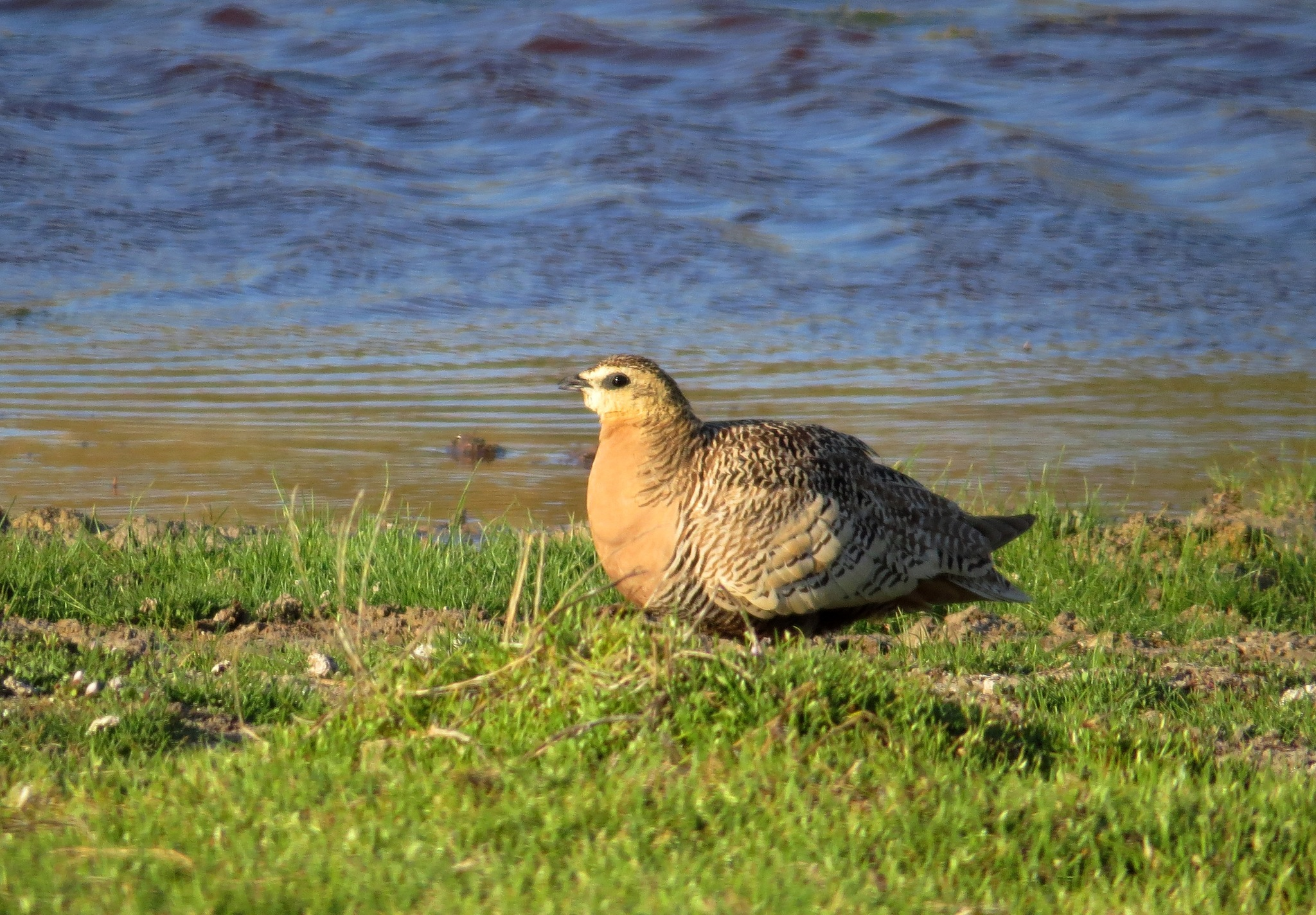
- Female

Conservation status
- Least Concern (IUCN 3.1)

Scientific classification
- Kingdom: Animalia
- Phylum: Chordata
- Class: Aves
- Order: Pterocliformes
- Family: Pteroclidae
- Genus: Pterocles
- Species: P. personatus

Binomial name
- Pterocles personatus Gould, 1843

= Madagascar sandgrouse =

Species of bird

The Madagascar sandgrouse (Pterocles personatus) is a species of bird in the family Pteroclidae. It is endemic to Madagascar and is a ground-dwelling short-legged plump bird. The head of the male is brown with a black area surrounding the beak. It has a pinkish-buff coloured breast, a light brown mottled back, brown wings and paler underparts barred with dark brown. The female has a generally duller appearance being cryptically coloured brown with dark specks and bars.

== Description ==
The Madagascar sandgrouse is a plump bird with a short tail and legs and is easy to identify because both sexes have black underwings and it is the only sandgrouse found in Madagascar. The adult male has a brown head with a distinctive black area surrounding the beak and a yellow ring of bare skin around the eye. The mantle, back and rump are blackish-brown speckled with buff. The flight feathers and main tail feathers are blackish-brown, the upper wing coverts being buff and the tail being barred and tipped with buff. The cheeks, sides of neck and upper breast are ochreous to pinkish buff, fading to white on the chin and throat. The lower breast is narrowly barred in dark brown and buff and this barring continues to the belly which is darker and more tawny brown. The beak is whitish, the eye brown and the legs grey.

The adult female lacks the black round the beak, instead having a blackish-brown crown and nape streaked with buff, and blackish-brown upper parts, narrowly barred and spotted with buff. The tail is blackish-brown, barred and tipped with buff. The breast is pinkish-buff with dark barring at the sides and the belly is similar to that of the male. The juvenile resembles the female but the barring is more brown than black and the general colouring is more muted.

== Distribution and habitat ==
The Madagascar sandgrouse is endemic to the island of Madagascar where it is found in the drier southern and western part of the country. Its habitat is dry open areas of mainly level ground with grasses and sparse vegetation, and includes the spiny forests of the southeastern part of the island. It visits water each day and can then be seen on stony river and lakeside areas and on sandbars.

== Behaviour ==
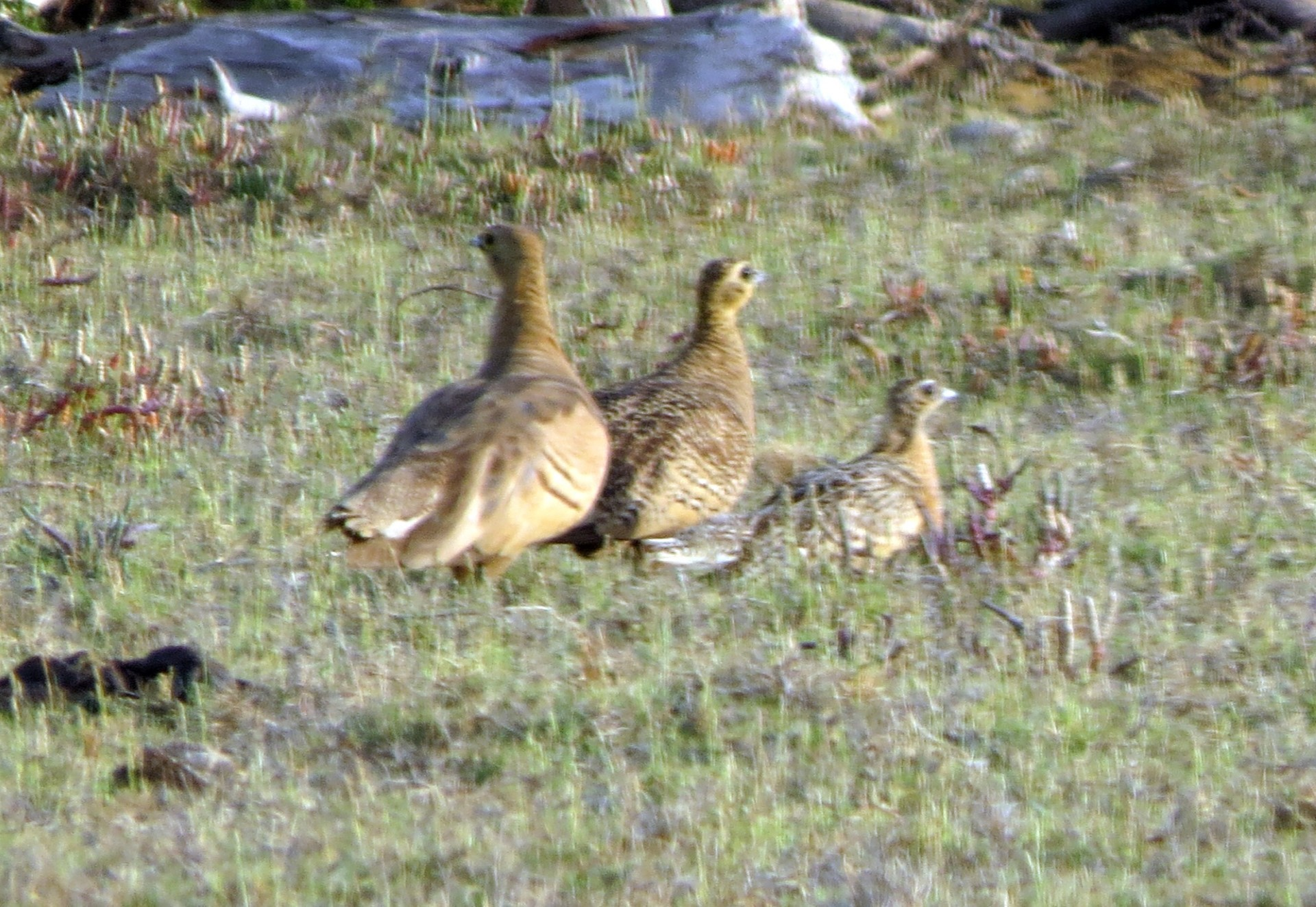
Family group with young

The Madagascar sandgrouse usually occurs in family-sized groups of three or four, but sometimes forms larger groups of a dozen birds or more. During the day it feeds on the ground, walking around foraging for seeds. It can run, but seldom does so. It has good hearing and sight and is easily alarmed, making human observations on foot difficult. When disturbed, it may freeze at first, but soon either slinks away or flushes abruptly. The group will fly off together landing a short distance away. It communicates with the other birds using a low, rapid, hoarse "ag-ag-ag-ag", or a similar single note repeated every couple of seconds.

In the early morning or late afternoon it tends to congregate at watering locations, although it may also drink at other times of day. It sometimes congregates in flocks of several hundred for this purpose, and may rest on sandbanks during the day. When drinking it sometimes wades into the water, a thing it does during the breeding season with the objective of carrying water to the young in the sodden breast feathers.

The adult birds form monogamous pairs, staying together when in larger groups. The nest is a depression on the ground, often beside a tree or shrub, in a clump of vegetation or among rocks or bushes. It is sparsely lined with some dried grasses, and an odd twig or snail shell. It is sometimes decorated with a ring of leaves round the edge, apparently gathered from elsewhere and brought to the nest site. The usually three eggs are greenish-brown, liberally blotched with dark brown. Both sexes share the incubation and will stay tight on the nest if approached, flushing when the intruder is 10 m (30 ft) or less from the nest.

== Status ==
The Madagascar sandgrouse is listed by the IUCN Red List of Threatened Species as being of "Least Concern". This is because it has a wide range within Madagascar and is common in the west and south of the country, though less common further north. It is hunted in some areas, but this is not considered to be a substantial threat.
