= Genomic evolution of birds =

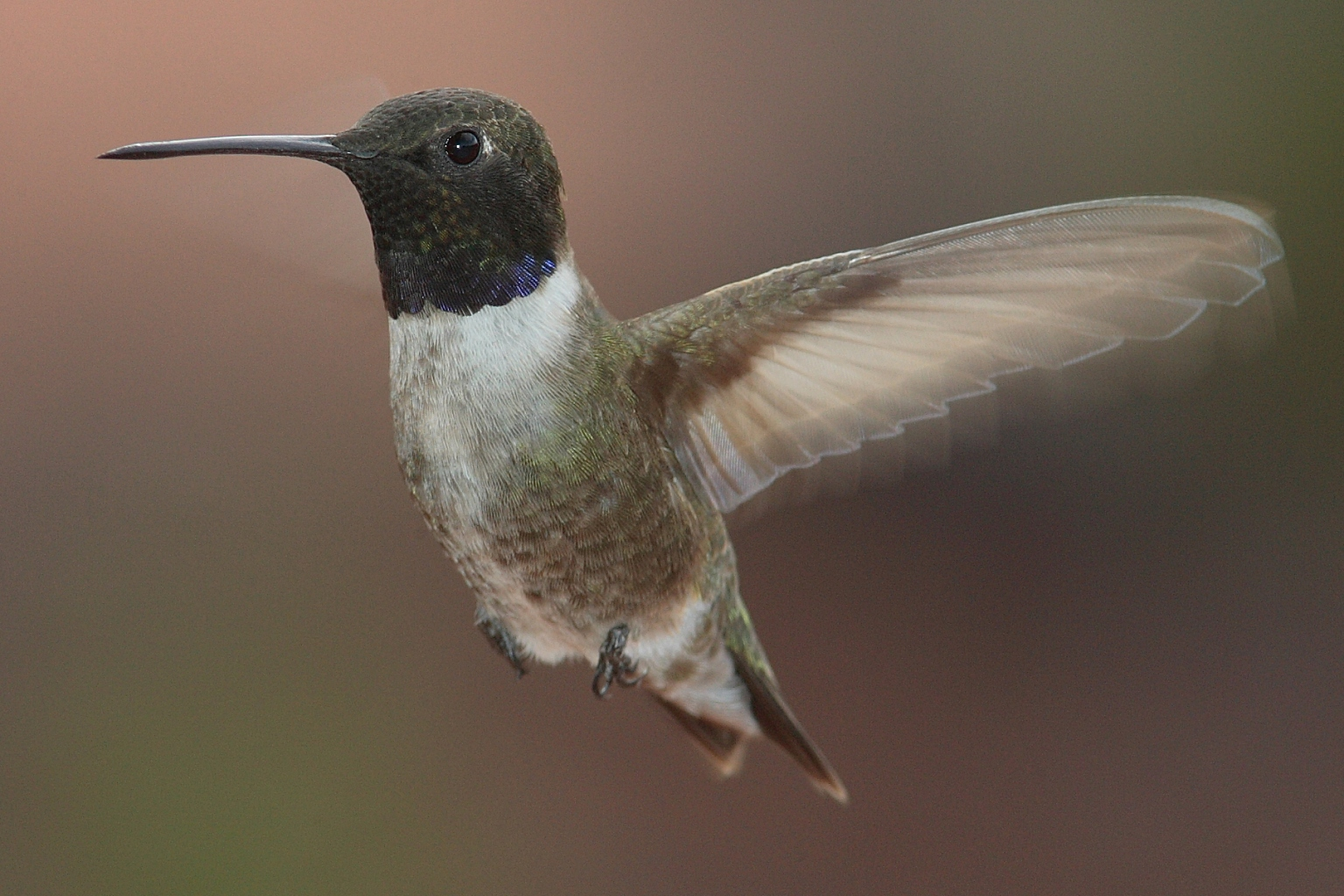
The black-chinned hummingbird (Archilochus alexandri) is the bird species known to have the smallest genome among birds, which is only 0.91 Gb long.

The genomic evolution of birds has come under scrutiny since the advent of rapid DNA sequencing, as birds have the smallest genomes of the amniotes despite acquiring highly derived phenotypic traits. Whereas mammalian and reptilian genomes range between 1.0 and 8.2 giga base pairs (Gb), avian genomes have sizes between 0.91 Gb (black-chinned hummingbird, Archilochus alexandri) and 1.3 Gb (common ostrich, Struthio camelus). Avian genomes reflect the action of natural selection and are the basis of their phenotypes, reflected in their morphology and behaviour, which have evolved significantly since their divergence from other archosaurian, diapsid, and amniotic lineages.

== Features of current bird genomes ==
Compared to other tetrapod lineages, birds have fewer repeated elements in their genomes, comprising only 4–10% of its extent, compared to 34–52% in mammals. The total size of avian short interspersed nuclear elements (SINEs) has been drastically reduced, averaging only 1.3 mega base pairs (Mb), compared to animals in similar lineages: The American alligator (Alligator mississippiensis), a fellow archosaur, averages 12.6 Mb SINEs, and the green sea turtle (Chelonia mydas), a non-archosaur diapsid, averages 34.9 Mb. These data suggest that the last common ancestor of modern birds already had a reduced number of SINEs.

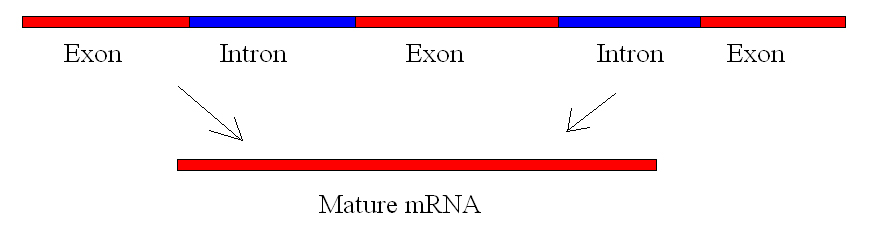
Introns are DNA sequences that occur in eukaryotic genes. They are transcribed to mRNA, but they are edited out before the mRNA is translated by ribosomes.

The mean size of introns, intergenic sequences, and even exons is significantly reduced. Mammalian and reptilian introns have an average size of 4.3 kb and 3.1 kb respectively, whereas those of birds are only 2.1 kb long. Likewise, gene spacing averages 91 kb for mammals and 61 kb for reptiles, but only 49 kb in birds. Similar reductions have occurred in bats, suggesting that genome-size reduction is advantageous to flying animals, allowing, for example, the rapid regulation of gene expression required for powered flight. To rule out the possibility of genomic expansion in mammals and reptiles, Zhang et al. (2014) reconstructed successive deletion events in the avian ancestral genome compared to the reptilian.

Birds have experienced the most genomic reductions of any vertebrate group. The early chromosomic fragmentation event that led to the appearance of microchromosomes in birds possibly contributed to this gene loss. These fragmentation events must have taken place in a common ancestor of most birds, since approximately every two out of three species studied have at least 30 pairs of microchromosomes, 2n = 80 being the size of the average karyotype of birds (with the only exception the family Falconidae, which are 2n = 6–12).

Macrosynteny studies have determined that, in vocal learner birds, genes have undergone a deeper rearrangement along their corresponding chromosomes than those of non-vocal learner birds. In addition to that, microsynteny studies revealed that birds possess a higher number of orthologous genes that maintain synteny. This proves that gene order along chromosomes is more conserved in birds than in other animal groups. A clear example are genes coding for haemoglobin subunits. These genes are easily duplicated and lost. As a consequence, there are huge differences regarding the number and relative position of the genes of alpha-hemoglobins and beta-hemoglobins in mammals. In birds, that is not the case. Both position and number of these genes are highly conserved among them.

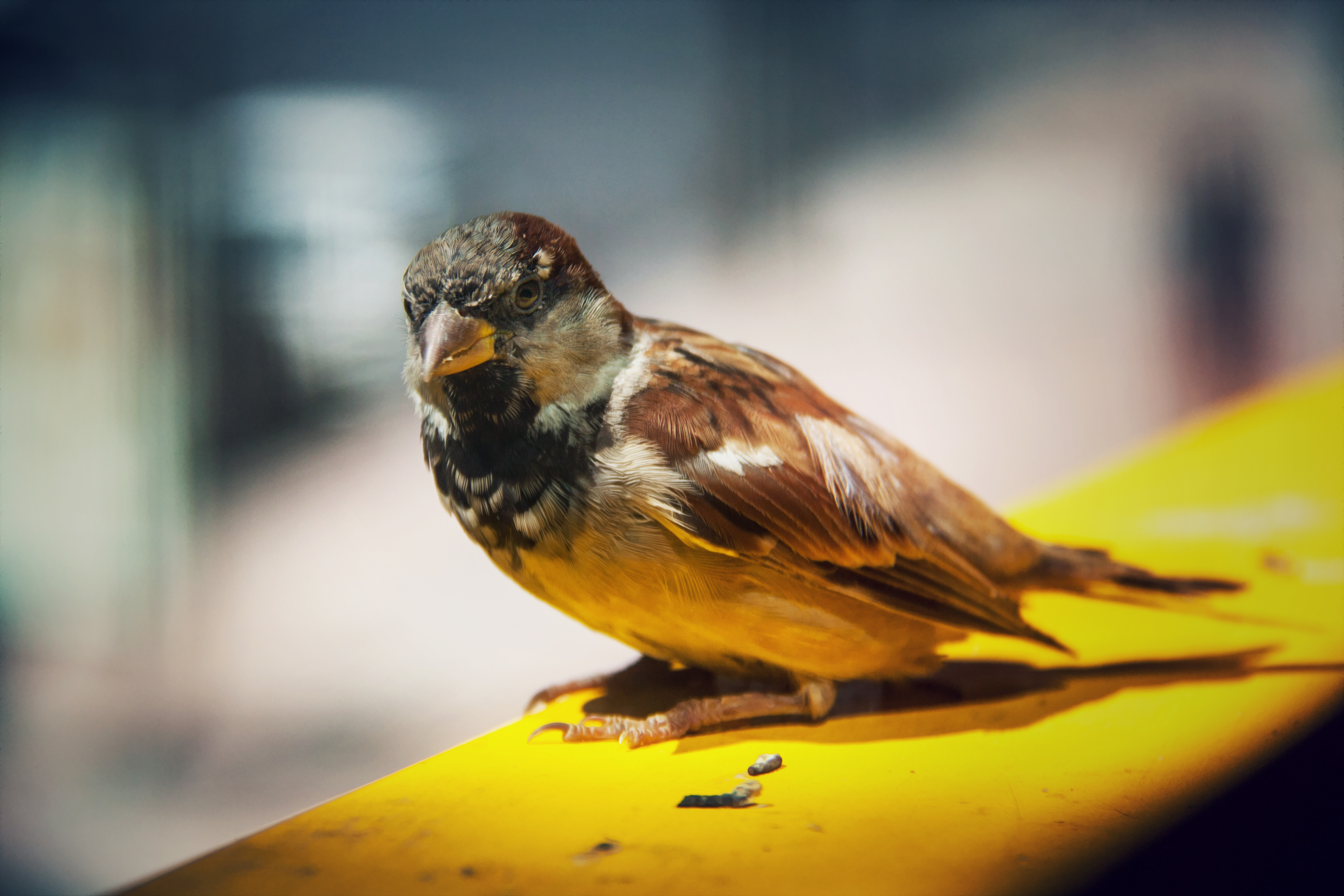
The genus name of the sparrows, Passer, gives its name to the order of Passeriformes. Birds classified in this order have the highest rate of point mutations among birds, though birds generally have lower rates than mammals.

Birds' point mutation rate (1.9×10^{−3} mutations per site per Ma) is smaller than that of mammals (2.7×10^{−3} mutations per site per Ma). This rate is also smaller among aequornithes (water birds) than that of telluraves (land birds). In this last group, birds of prey have the smallest mutation rate, and songbirds have the highest. These rates are consistent with the broad distribution of birds in different environments and the phenotypic changes in response to selective pressures exerted by the ecological niches they occupy.

The presence of functional restrictions in genome self-regulation can be studied by comparing the genomes of species whose last common ancestor is more ancient. It is known that, approximately, 7.5% of bird genome is comprised by highly conserved elements (HCEs). Of those HCEs, 12.6% are directly involved in protein coding genes functionality. Non-coding HCEs that are bird specific (not found in mammals) happen to be related with the regulation of the activity of transcription factors related to metabolism. In comparison, mammal HCEs are related to controlling cell signalling, development, and response to stimuli.

== Evolutionary genomic changes ==
The rate of genetic variation is not homogeneous across the genome. This can be assayed using K_{a}/K_{s} ratio studies (also known as d_{N}/d_{S}) to estimate the balance between neutral mutations, purifying mutations, and beneficial mutations.

In birds, Z-chromosome genes have the highest variability, perhaps due to the low gene density in the Z-chromosome. Genetic variability is higher in macrochromosomes than in microchromosomes, perhaps related to the lower recombination frequency of the latter.

While genes that mediate the development of the central nervous system vary most rapidly in mammals, the genes that mediate morphological development experience the most rapid change in avian genomes.

=== Genome relation to singing ===
The avian ability to learn songs has appeared independently at least twice: once in the ancestor of hummingbirds and another in the common ancestor of songbirds and parrots. These lineages possess a number of neuronal circuits not found in lineages unable to learn songs. A d_{N}/d_{S} analysis showed conserved evolution in 227 genes, most of which are highly expressed in the regions of the brain that control singing. Furthermore, 20% of them seemed to be regulated by singing.

=== Genomic evolution of morphological features ===
To fly, bird ancestors had to undergo a series of changes at the molecular level that translate into changes at the morphological level. Approximately half of the genes involved in ossification are known to have been positively selected. Some relevant examples are AHSG, that controls bone mineralization density, and P2RX7, which is associated to bone homeostasis. Their action would be responsible for the differences observed between mammal and bird bones.

Something similar occurs with the respiratory system. In mammals, the total inner volume of lungs changes during ventilation. However, this does not happen in birds. They make the air circulate through their lungs by contracting and expanding their air sacs. Five genes are involved in this process in mammals and birds.

Feathers are one of the most characteristic features of birds, along with the beak. Feathers are formed from α- and β-keratins. Compared to reptiles and mammals, α-keratin protein family has been reduced in birds, whereas β-keratins has expanded enormously. That every major bird lineage possesses at least one protein of each of the six β-keratin groups suggests that their last common ancestor already possessed a large diversity of this kind of protein. 56% of β-keratins are feather-specific and can only be found in birds, whereas those that make up scales and claws can also be found in reptiles. The variety and number of copies of these genes seems to correlate with the bird's lifestyle, land birds having a larger variety, and the variety being larger still in domestic birds.

Birds are also known for toothlessness, perhaps a consequence of several modifications and deletions which occurred in the exons of the genes implicated in the formation of enamel and dentine. It is thought that the avian common ancestor already lacked mineralized teeth, and that later genome changes pushed the situation to the current status.

Birds have the best visual system known in vertebrates. They have a higher number of photoreceptors, and most birds are tetrachromats. The only exceptions are penguins, which have only three functional opsin genes (and hence are trichromats), perhaps related to their aquatic lifestyle, as marine mammals have also lost either one or two cone opsin genes.

In many birds the right ovary has become non-functional. Two ovary development-related genes, MMP19 and AKR1C3, have disappeared in birds. The fact that a high number of genes related to spermatogenesis are evolving quickly (which does not happen in those related to ovogenensis) suggest that males undergo a stronger selective pressure.

== Clarification of early diversification of birds ==
Rapid genomic sequencing data enabled research into the early evolution and divergence of bird groups and produced a more detailed phylogenetic tree. Earlier phylogenetic reconstructions based on single genes proved inadequate due to incomplete lineage sorting.

The low resolution of single-gene phylogenies, scarcity of coding DNA data, and convergent evolution confused early attempts to reconstruct avian phylogeny. For example, when base pairing errors occur, DNA repair mechanisms favor GC pairs.

Genomic analysis suggests 36 bird lineages arose in a period of 10–15 My, relatively quickly on an evolutionary timescale. That period includes the massive K-Pg extinction event that freed many niches, allowing for the adaptive radiation and diversification of surviving species. The genomic analysis accords with fossil record data and with mammal evolution estimates.

The cladogram from this analysis recovers Accipitriformes as a separate clade from Falconiformes, which traditionally subsumed it.

- Birds
  - Neognathae
    - Neoaves
      - Passerea
        - - - - Telluraves
                - Australaves
                  - - Passerimorphae
                      - Passeriformes
                        - - Passeri
                            - - Zebra finch
                              - Medium ground finch
                            - American crow
                          - Tyranni
                            Golden-collared manakin
                        - - Acanthisitti
                            Rifleman
                      - Psittaciformes
                        - Budgerigar
                        - Kea
                    - Falconiformes
                      Peregrine falcon
                  - - Cariamiformes
                      Red-legged seriema
                - Afroaves
                  - - Coraciimorphae
                      - - - - - Coraciiformes
                                Carmine Bee-eater
                              - Piciformes
                                Downy Woodpecker
                            - - Bucerotiformes
                                Rhinoceros hornbill
                          - - Trogoniformes
                              Bar-tailed trogon
                        - - Leptosomiformes
                            Cuckoo roller
                      - - Coliiformes
                          Speckled mousebird
                    - Strigiformes
                      Barn Owl
                  - - Accipitrimorphae
                      - Accipitriformes
                        - Accipitridae
                          - Bald eagle
                          - White-tailed eagle
                      - Cathartidae
                        Turkey vulture
            - - Aequornithes
                - - Pelecanimorphae
                    - - Pelecaniformes
                        - Pelecanidae
                          Dalmatian pelican
                        - Ardeidae
                          Little egret
                      - Threskiornithidae
                        Ibis
                    - - Phalacrocoracidae
                        Great cormorant
                  - Procellariimorphae
                    - Procellariiformes
                      Northern fulmar
                    - Sphenisciformes
                      - Adelie penguin
                      - Emperor penguin
                - - Gaviimorphae
                    - Gaviiformes
                      Red-throated loon
              - Phaetontimorphae
                - Phaethoniformes
                  White-tailed tropicbird
                - Eurypygiformes
                  Sunbittern
          - - Cursorimorphae
              - Charadriiformes
                Killdeer
              - Gruiformes
                Grey-crowned crane
            - Opisthocomiformes
              Hoatzin
        - - Caprimulgimorphae
            - Caprimulgiformes
              - Trochiliformes
                Hummingbirds
              - Apodidae
                Common swift
            - Caprimulgidae
              Chuck-will's-widow
          - Otidimorphae
            - - Otidiformes
                Bustard
              - Musophagiformes
                Red-crested turaco
            - - Cuculiformes
                Common cuckoo
      - Columbea
        - Columbimorphae
          - - Mesitornithiformes
              Brown mesite
            - Pterocliformes
              Yellow-throated sandgrouse
          - - Columbiformes
              Pigeon
        - Phoenicopterimorphae
          - Phoenicopteriformes
            American flamingo
          - Podicipediformes
            Great crested grebe
    - Galloanseres
      - Anseriformes
        - Mallard
        - Tufted duck
      - Galliformes
        - Turkey
        - Chicken
  - Paleognathae
    - Tinamiformes
      White-throated tinamou
    - Struthioniformes
      Common ostrich

Phylogenetic tree of birds according to Jarvis et al. 2014 In the present representation, due to format restrictions, evolutive distances between different taxa are not directly presented.
