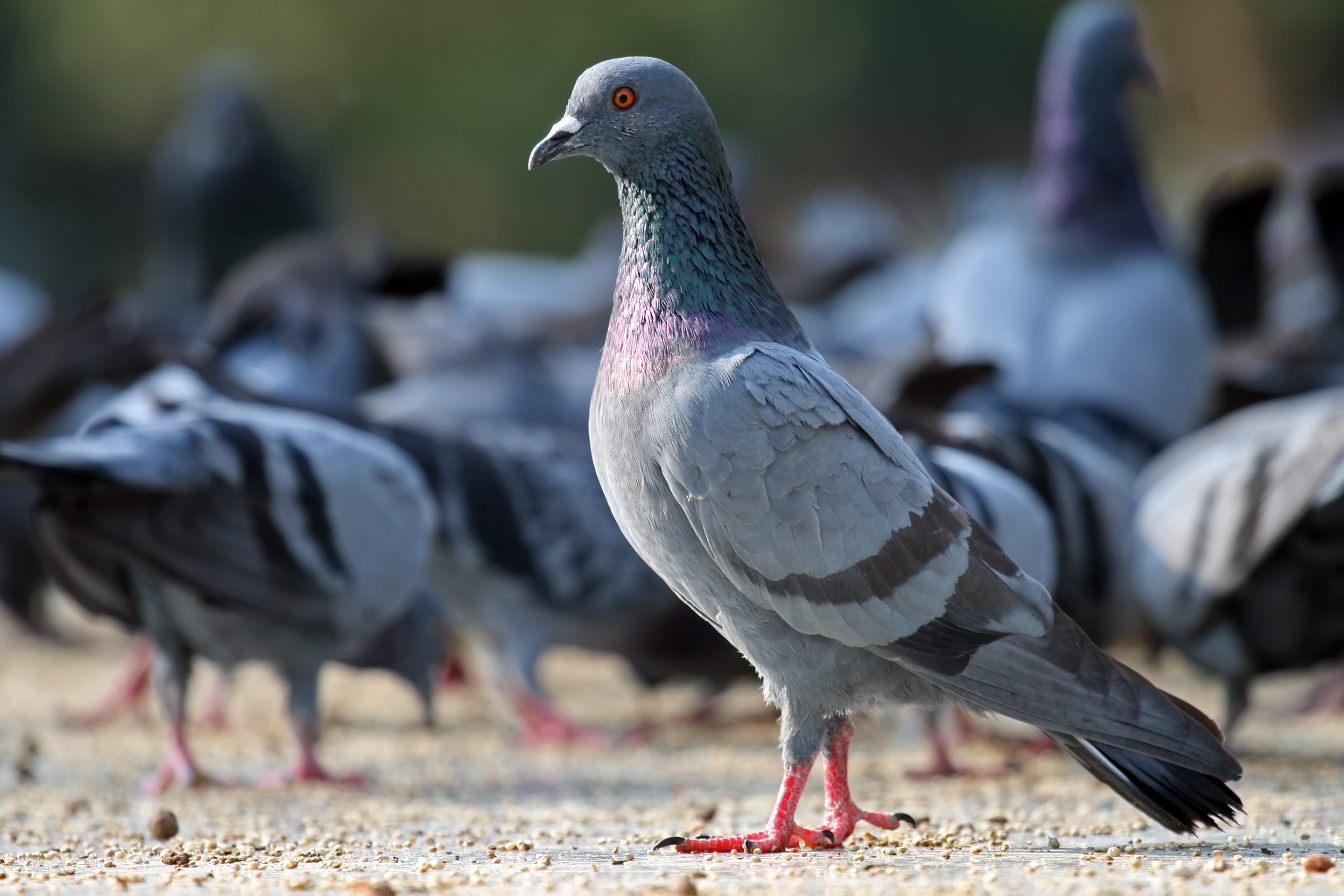
- Rock Pigeon (Columba livia)
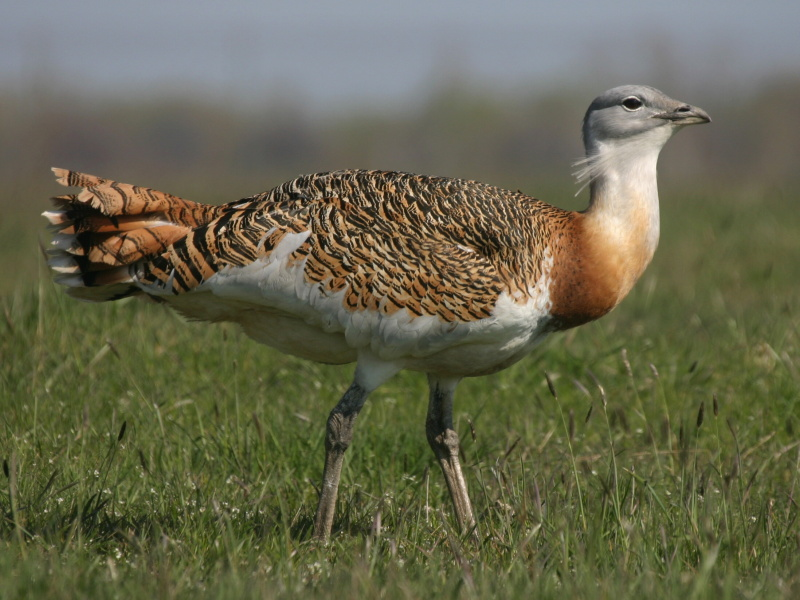
- Great Bustard (Otis tarda)

Scientific classification
- Kingdom: Animalia
- Phylum: Chordata
- Class: Aves
- Clade: Neoaves
- Clade: Columbaves; Prum et al., 2015

Clades
- Otidimorphae; Columbimorphae

= Columbaves =

Columbaves Temporal range: Eocene–Recent

Taxon of birds

Columbaves is a taxon that contains Columbimorphae (pigeons, mesites, and sandgrouse) and Otidimorphae (bustards, cuckoos, and turacos) discovered by genomic analysis by Prum et al. (2015). This conflicts with the Columbea and Otidae hypotheses in which Mirandornithes are the sister taxon to Columbimorphae and Cypselomorphae the sister taxon to Otidimorphae, respectively, found by Jarvis et al. (2014). Neither hypothesis supports the two subdivisions of Metaves and Coronoaves as previous studies had found.

- Columbaves
  - Otidimorphae
    - Musophagiformes (turacos)
    - - Otidiformes (bustards)
      - Cuculiformes (cuckoos)
  - Columbimorphae
    - Columbiformes (pigeons and doves)
    - Pteroclimesites
      - Mesitornithiformes (mesites)
      - Pterocliformes (sandgrouse)

In 2020 Kuhl et al. sequenced 3-prime untranslated region (3’UTR) from 429 species and 379 genera of birds found support of Columbaves in their study. However they have found that cuckoos are the sister group to pigeons within Columbimorphae instead as shown in the cladogram below:

- Columbaves
  - Musophagotides
    - Musophagiformes (turacos)
    - Otidiformes (bustards)
  - Columbimorphae
    - - Columbiformes (pigeons and doves)
      - Cuculiformes (cuckoos)
    - Pteroclimesites
      - Mesitornithiformes (mesites)
      - Pterocliformes (sandgrouse)

== See also ==
- Columbea
- Otidae
- Metaves
