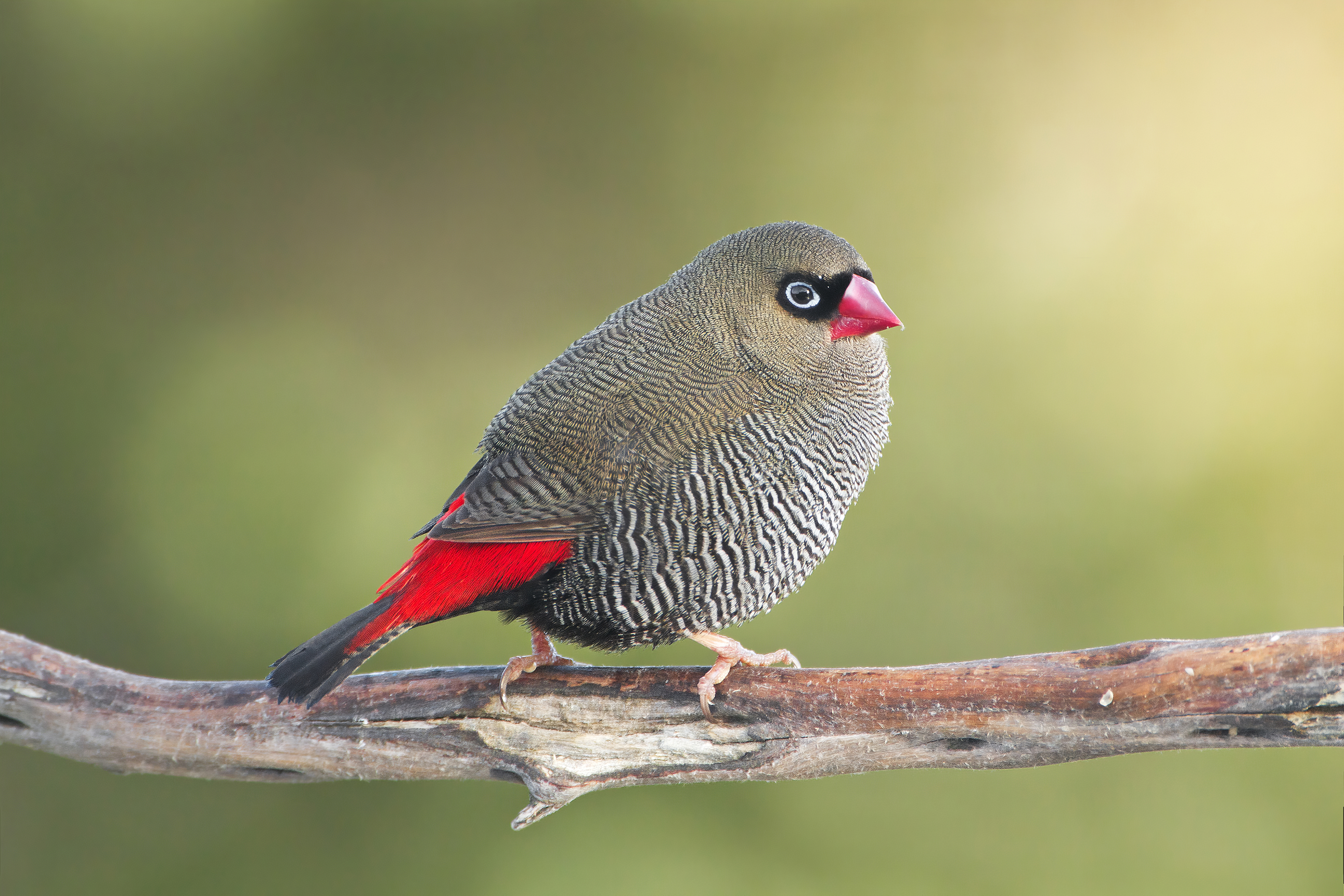
- Beautiful firetail (Stagonopleura bella)

Scientific classification
- Kingdom: Animalia
- Phylum: Chordata
- Class: Aves
- Infraclass: Neognathae
- Clade: Neoaves
- Clade: Passerea; Jarvis et al., 2014

Clades
- Strisores; Opisthocomiformes; Gruimorphae; Phaethoquornithes; Telluraves; Otidimorphae (excluded in the Stiller et al. 2024 analysis)

= Passerea =

Passerea Temporal range: Early Paleocene–Holocene 62–0 Ma Possible an early origin based on molecular clock

Taxon of birds

Passerea is a taxon of neoavian birds that was proposed by Jarvis et al. (2014). Their genomic analysis recovered two major clades within Neoaves, Passerea and Columbea, and concluded that both clades appear to have many ecologically driven convergent traits.

According to Jarvis (2014), these convergences include the foot-propelled diving trait of grebes in Columbea with loons and cormorants in Passerea; the wading-feeding trait of flamingos in Columbea with ibises and egrets in Passerea; and pigeons and sandgrouse in Columbea with shorebirds (killdeer) in Passerea. For Jarvis (2014), these long-known trait and morphological alliances suggest that some of the traditional nongenomic trait classifications are based on polyphyletic assemblages.

Passerea was not recovered in other studies.

== Phylogeny ==
Cladogram of Passerea relationships based on Jarvis et al. (2014) with some clade names after Yuri et al. (2013) and Kimball et al. 2013.

- Passerea
  - - Otidae
      - Strisores
        (hummingbirds, swifts, nightjars)
      - Otidimorphae
        - Cuculiformes
          (cuckoos)
        - Musophagotides
          - Otidiformes
            (bustards)
          - Musophagiformes
            (turacos)
  - - - Gruae
        - Opisthocomiformes
          (hoatzin)
        - Gruimorphae
          - Gruiformes
            (rails & cranes)
          - Charadriiformes
            (shorebirds)
    - - Phaethoquornithes
        - Aequornithes
          (loons, penguins, herons, pelicans, storks, etc.)
        - Eurypygimorphae
          - Eurypygiformes
            (sunbittern, kagu)
          - Phaethontiformes
            (tropicbirds)
      - Telluraves
        - Afroaves
          - - Accipitrimorphae
              - Cathartiformes
                (New World vultures)
              - Accipitriformes
                (eagles, hawks, Old World vultures, & kin)
          - - Strigiformes
              (owls)
            - Coraciimorphae
              - Coliiformes
                (mousebirds)
              - Cavitaves
                - Leptosomiformes
                  (cuckoo-roller)
                - Eucavitaves
                  - Trogoniformes
                    (trogons)
                  - Picocoraciae
                    - Bucerotiformes
                      (hornbills, hoopoe, & wood hoopoes)
                    - Picodynastornithes
                      - Coraciformes
                        (kingfishers)
                      - Piciformes
                        (woodpeckers, toucans, & kin)
        - Australaves
          - Cariamiformes
            (seriemas & terror birds)
          - Eufalconimorphae
            - Falconiformes
              (falcons)
            - Psittacopasserae
              - Psittaciformes
                (parrots)
              - Passeriformes
                (songbirds & kin)

The following cladogram illustrates the proposed relationships between bird clades of Passerea. This consensus phylogeny of birds is based on phylogenomic data, reflecting a recent phylogenomic supertree analysis per Stiller et al. (2024).

- Passerea
