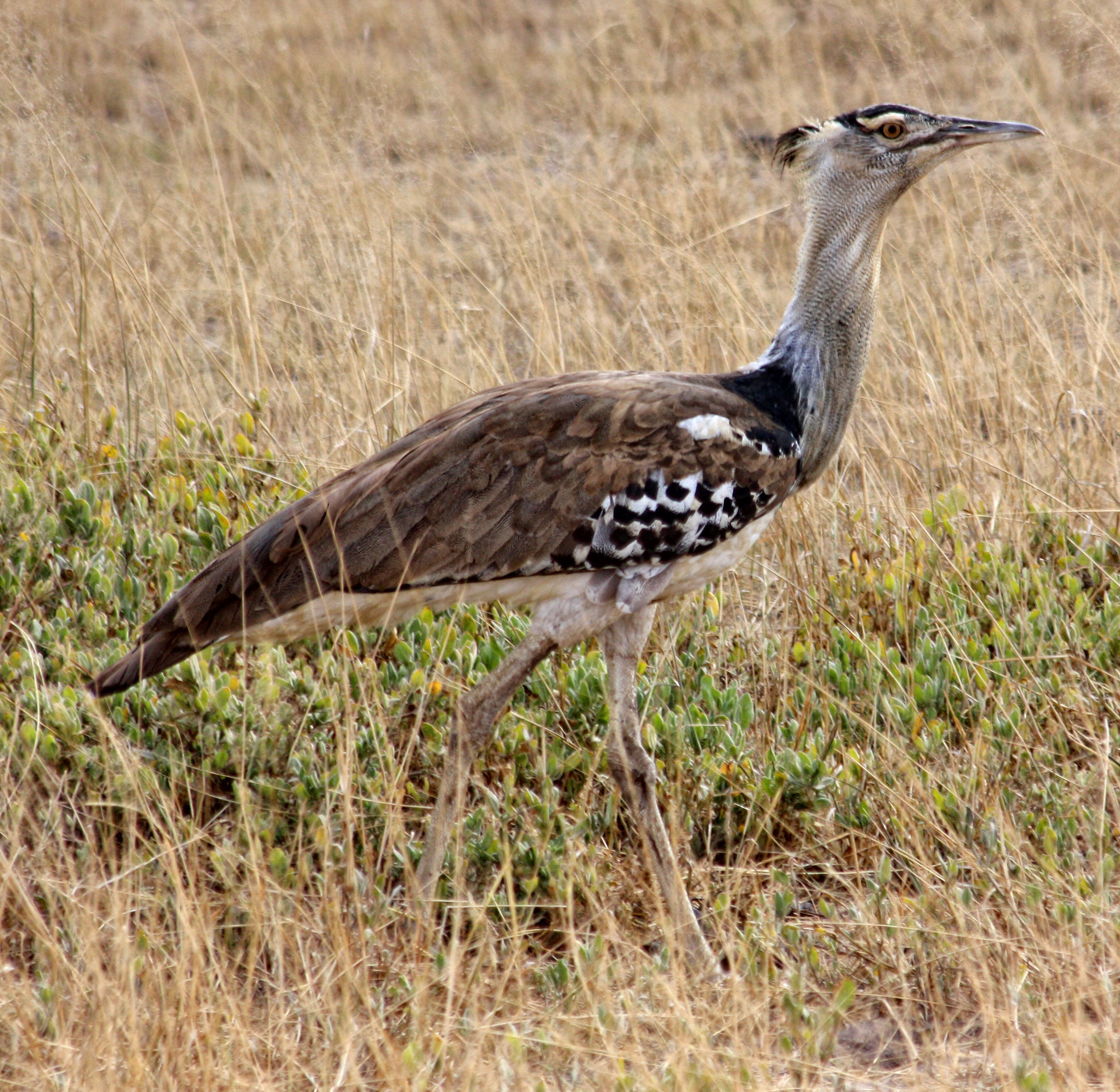
- Kori bustard (Ardeotis kori)

Scientific classification
- Kingdom: Animalia
- Phylum: Chordata
- Class: Aves
- Infraclass: Neognathae
- Clade: Neoaves
- Clade: Otidae; Wagler, 1830

Subgroups
- Otidimorphae; Strisores

= Otidae =

Otidae Temporal range: Paleocene - Holocene

Taxon of birds

Otidae is a taxon that includes the superorders Otidimorphae (bustards, turacos, and cuckoos) and Strisores (nightbirds, swifts, and hummingbirds). It was identified in 2014 by genome analysis. Earlier it was thought that Strisores was closely related to birds such as pigeons, flamingos, tropicbirds, and the sunbittern and kagu in the taxon Metaves, but subsequent work has provided evidence that Metaves is polyphyletic. Although analyses of genome data provided relatively high support for monophyly of Otidae, indicating that it is sister to all other Passerea clades, other analyses of large data matrices have not recovered a clade comprising Otidimorphae and Strisores, raising questions about the monophyly of Otidae.
