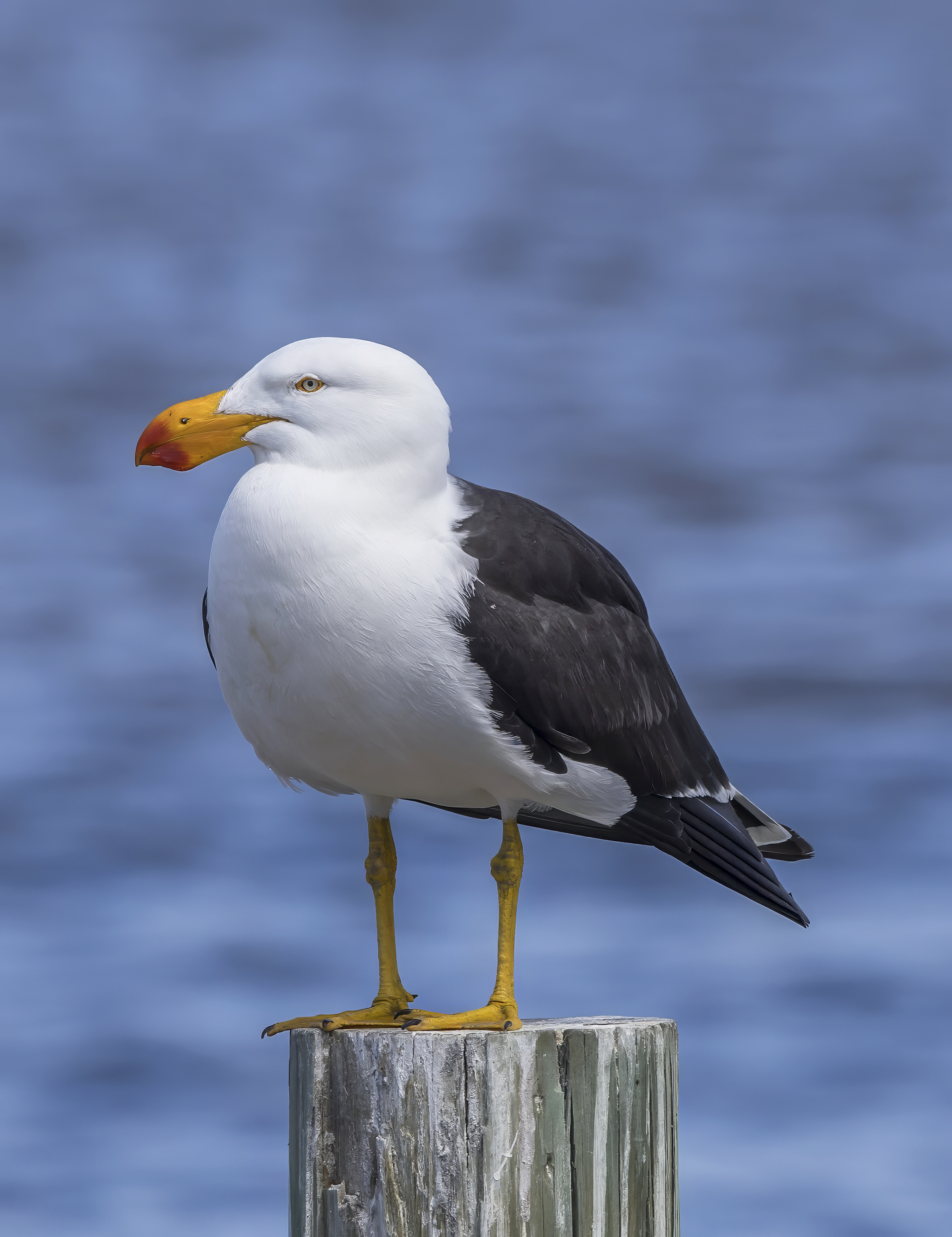
- Pacific gull (Larus pacificus).

Scientific classification
- Kingdom: Animalia
- Phylum: Chordata
- Class: Aves
- Clade: Neoaves
- Clade: Elementaves; Stiller et al., 2024

Clades
- Gruae; Strisores; Phaethoquornithes

= Elementaves =

Elementaves Temporal range: Early Paleocene – Recent 62–0 Ma

Taxon of neoavian birds

Elementaves is a taxon of birds, comprising a diverse group of birds who occupy various different ecological niches. They include the clades Phaethoquornithes and Strisores, as well as the Gruimorphae and Opisthocomiformes. According to Stiller et al. (2024), it is one of the four major subclades of Neoaves and sister to Telluraves. The clade's name refers to the classical elements, reflecting its members' varying adaptations to earth, air, and water.
