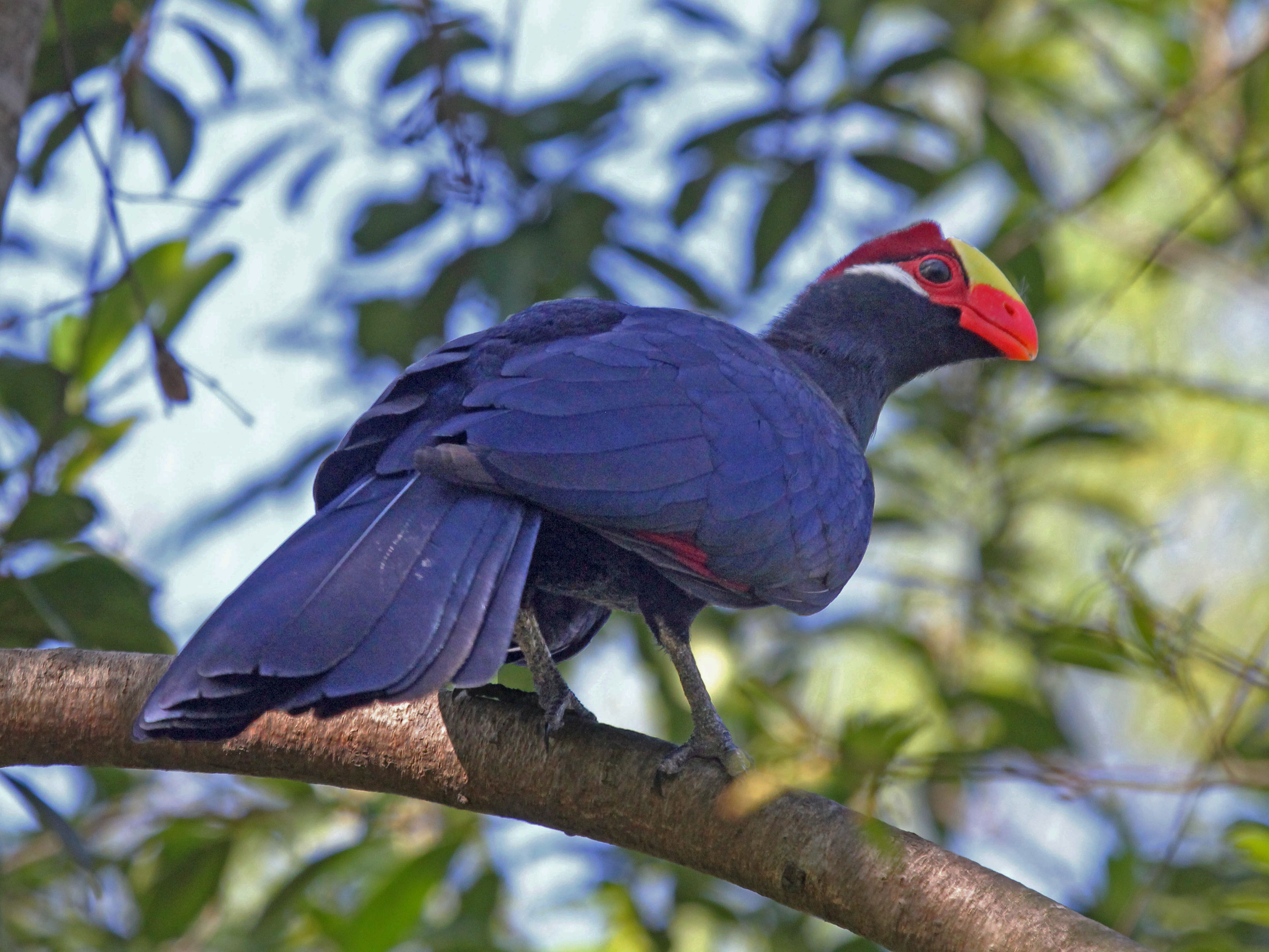
- At Jacksonville Zoo, Florida

Conservation status
- Near Threatened (IUCN 3.1)

Scientific classification
- Kingdom: Animalia
- Phylum: Chordata
- Class: Aves
- Order: Musophagiformes
- Family: Musophagidae
- Genus: Tauraco
- Species: T. violaceus

Binomial name
- Tauraco violaceus (Isert, 1788)

= Violet turaco =

Species of bird

The violet turaco, also known as the violaceous plantain eater (Tauraco violaceus, syn.: Musophaga violacea), is a large turaco, a group of African otidimorphae.

== Characteristics ==
These are unmistakable birds, but shy and often inconspicuous in the treetops. They are approximately 48 cm (19 in) long, including a long tail and a 4 cm (1.6 in) bill. They boast a winglength of 21 cm (8.3 in) and weigh approximately 360 g (13 oz). The plumage is glossy violet, except for the yellow forehead, chestnut crown and white ear coverts; the bill is thick and red. In flight, the violet turaco's crimson primary flight feathers contrast with the violet plumage. The red colour in the wings is typical of turacos.

== Habitat ==
It is resident of West Africa, and has an extremely large range from Senegal through to Nigeria, with isolated populations in Chad and the Central African Republic. It occurs in tropical savannas, wetlands, woodlands and forests.

== Diet ==
Diet consists of fruit, and they are quite partial to figs, but they will also eat leaves, buds, flowers, insects, snails and slugs.

== Reproduction ==
Cooperative breeding behavior has been observed in captivity in this species. They breed mainly during the rainy season, but the timing varies from place to place. As the breeding starts around April in Senegal and Gambia, while in Nigeria it occurs between June and October. The female lays two eggs in a flimsy tree platform nest. Both male and female take care of the eggs and hatchlings.

== Threats ==
This species is locally common, but is vulnerable to trapping for the pet trade in Guinea, Sierra Leone, Liberia and Ghana.

== Behavior ==
Turacos are social birds, travelling in flocks of around ten to twelve individuals. They are not strong fliers, preferring to hop along branches. When threatened, they can run quickly through the trees. The violet turaco has a loud "cooroo-cooroo" call.

== Gallery ==
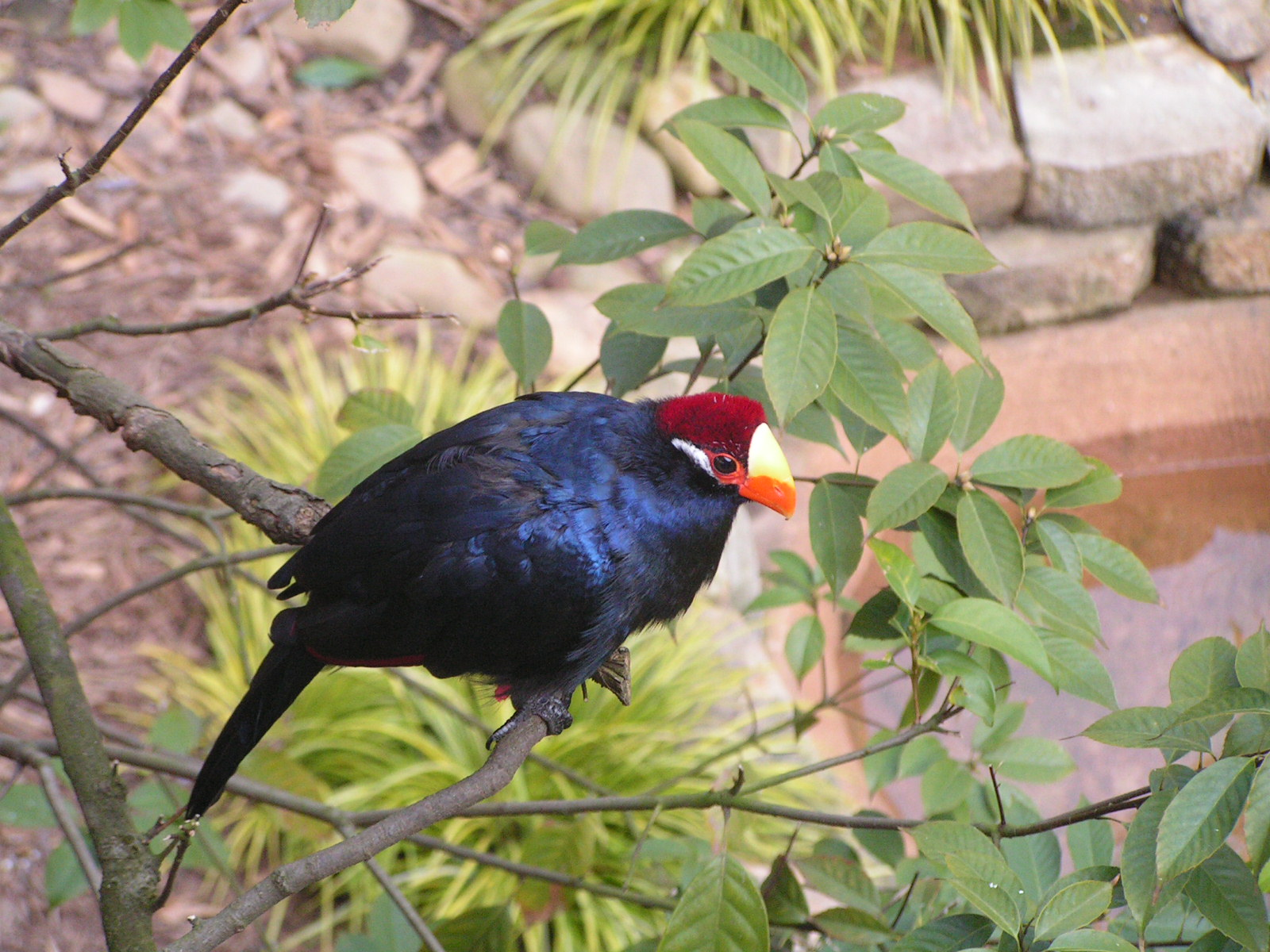
At Atlanta Zoo, Georgia, US

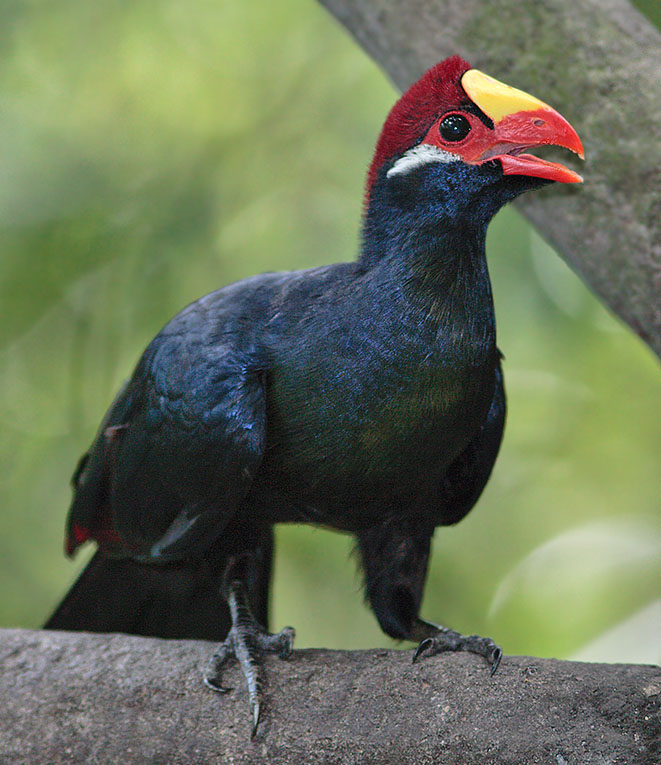

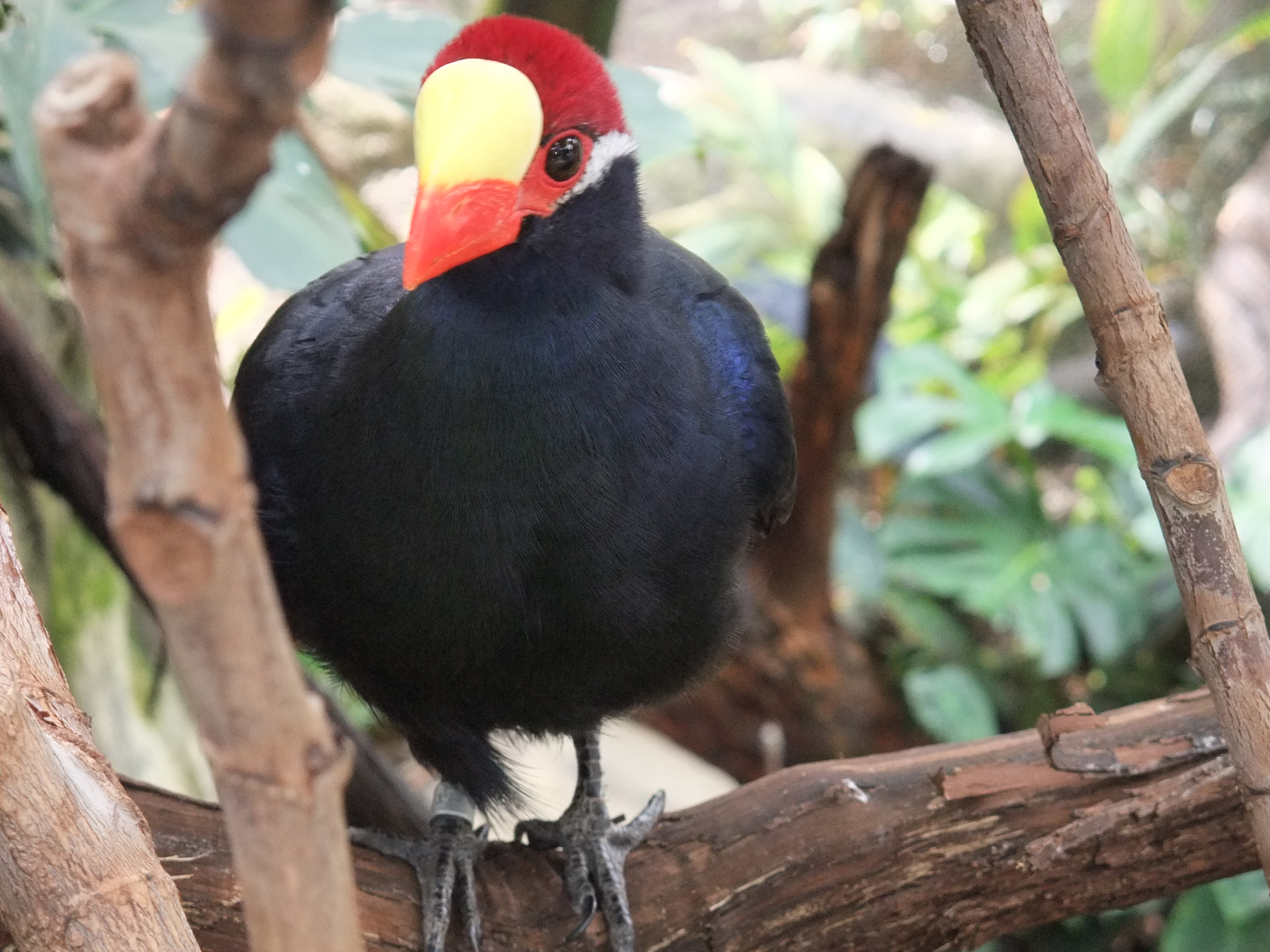

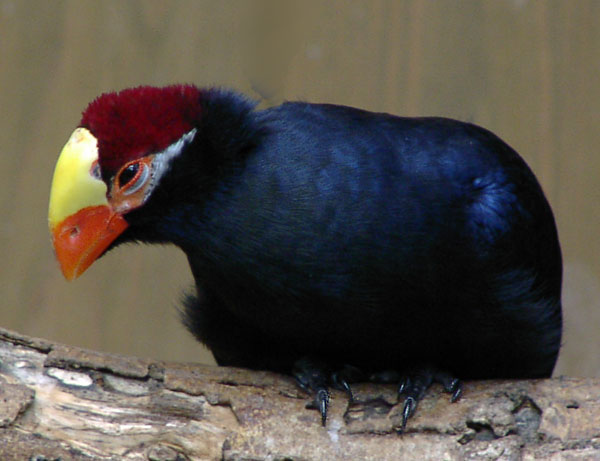

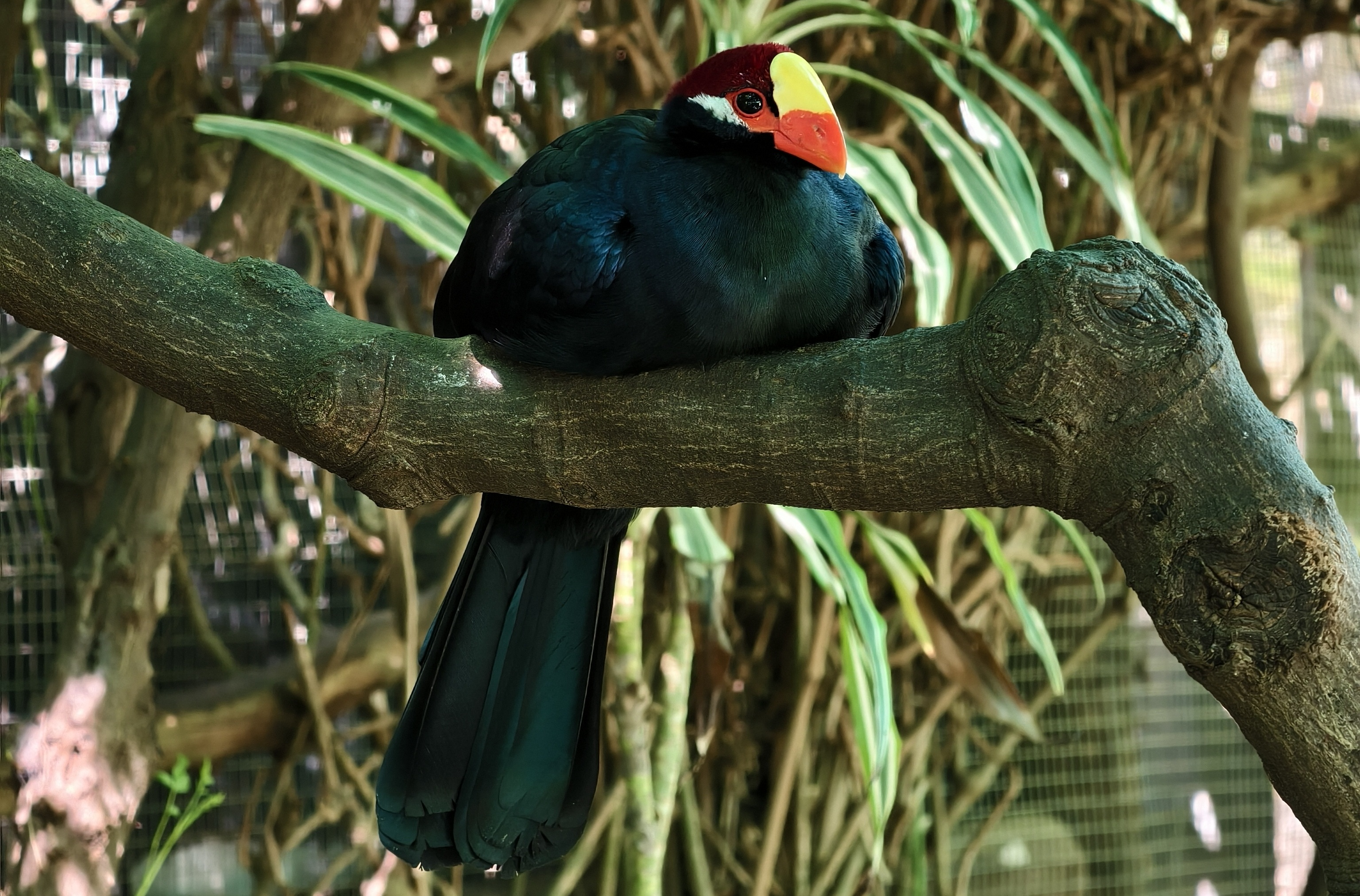
Violet turaco, World of Birds Wildlife Sanctuary & Monkey Park, Hout Bay, South Africa

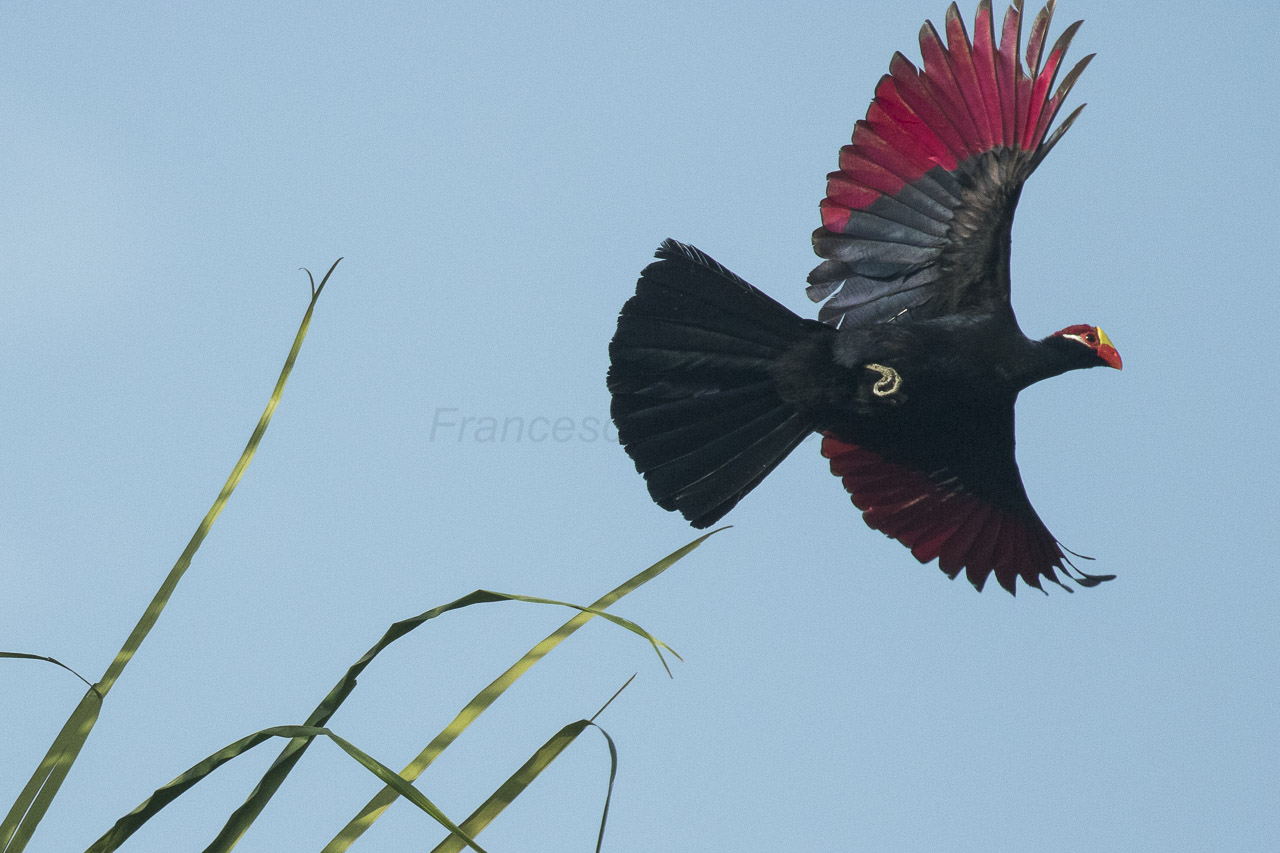
In flight, displaying crimson primary feathers
