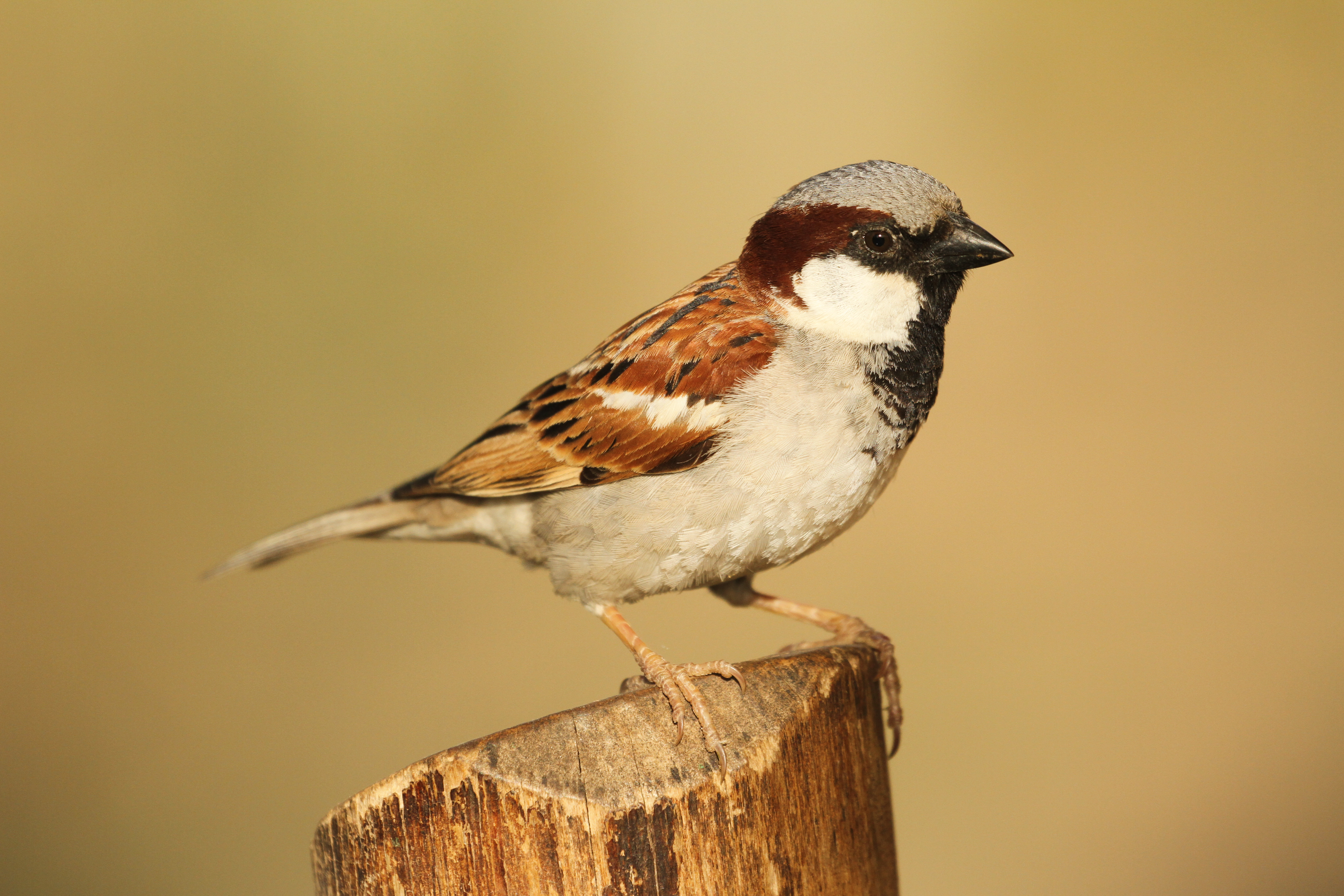
- House sparrow (Passer domesticus)

Scientific classification
- Kingdom: Animalia
- Phylum: Chordata
- Class: Aves
- Infraclass: Neognathae
- Clade: Neoaves; Sibley et al., 1988

Clades
- Columbimorphae; Otidimorphae; Mirandornithes; Strisores; Phaethoquornithes; Eurypygimorphae; Aequornithes; Telluraves; Order Opisthocomiformes; Order Gruiformes; Order Charadriiformes

= Neoaves =

Neoavians Temporal range: Maastrichtian–Recent, ~72–0 Ma Possible Coniacian-Campanian origin based on molecular clock

Clade of birds

Neoaves is a clade that consists of all modern birds (Neornithes or Aves) with the exception of Palaeognathae (ratites and kin) and Galloanserae (ducks, chickens and kin). This group is defined in the PhyloCode by George Sangster and colleagues in 2022 as "the most inclusive crown clade containing Passer domesticus, but not Gallus gallus". Almost 95% of the roughly 10,000 known species of extant birds belong to the Neoaves.

The early diversification of the various neoavian groups occurred very rapidly around the Cretaceous–Paleogene extinction event, and attempts to resolve their relationships with each other have resulted initially in much controversy.

== Phylogeny ==
The early diversification of the various neoavian groups occurred very rapidly around the Cretaceous–Paleogene extinction event. As a result of the rapid radiation, attempts to resolve their relationships have produced conflicting results, some quite controversial, especially in the earlier studies. Nevertheless, some recent large phylogenomic studies of Neoaves have led to much progress on defining orders and supraordinal groups within Neoaves. Still, the studies have failed to reach a consensus on an overall higher-order topology of these groups. A genomic study of 48 taxa by Jarvis and colleagues in 2014 divided Neoaves into two main clades, Columbea and Passerea, but an analysis of 198 taxa by Prum and colleagues in 2015 recovered different groupings for the earliest split in Neoaves. A reanalysis with an extended dataset by Reddy and colleagues in 2017 suggested this was due to the type of sequence data, with coding sequences favouring the Prum et al. topology. The disagreement on topology even with large phylogenomic studies led Alexander Suh in 2016 to propose a hard polytomy of nine clades at the base of Neoaves. An analysis by Houde and colleagues in 2019 recovered Columbea and a reduced hard polytomy of six clades within Passerea.

Despite other disagreements, these studies do agree on several supraordinal groups, which Reddy and colleagues in 2017 dubbed the "magnificent seven", which together with three "orphaned orders" make up Neoaves. Significantly, they both include a large waterbird clade (Aequornithes) and a large landbird clade (Telluraves). The groups defined by Reddy and colleagues (2017) are as follows:

- The "magnificent seven" supraordinal clades:
1. Telluraves (landbirds)
2. Aequornithes (waterbirds)
3. Eurypygimorphae (sunbittern, kagu and tropicbirds)
4. Otidimorphae (turacos, bustards and cuckoos)
5. Strisores (nightjars, swifts, hummingbirds and allies)
6. Columbimorphae (mesites, sandgrouse and pigeons)
7. Mirandornithes (flamingos and grebes)
- The three orphaned orders:
  - Opisthocomiformes (hoatzin)
  - Gruiformes (cranes and rails)
  - Charadriiformes (shorebirds, gulls and alcids)

As such, the exact true phylogeny of Neoaves is not fully understood and can be represented as a polytomy. Here, following Sangster and colleagues (2022), two clades of the magnificent seven, the Aequornithes and the Eurypygimorphae, are grouped together as the Phaethoquornithes. This grouping is supported by most studies, but not by Reddy (2017):

- Neoaves
  - Mirandornithes
  - Columbimorphae
  - Otidimorphae
  - Strisores
  - Opisthocomiformes
  - Gruiformes
  - Charadriiformes
  - Phaethoquornithes
  - Telluraves

=== Comparison of different proposals for neoavian radiation ===
Jarvis et al. (2014)

- - Columbea
    - Mirandornithes (flamingos, grebes)
    - Columbimorphae (pigeons, mesites, sandgrouse)
  - Passerea
    - - Otidae
        - Otidimorphae (cuckoos, bustards, turacos)
        - Strisores (hummingbirds, swifts, nightbirds)
    - - - Gruae
          - Opisthocomiformes (hoatzin)
          - Gruimorphae
            - Gruiformes (cranes, rails)
            - Charadriiformes (shorebirds)
      - - Phaethoquornithes
          - Eurypygimorphae (sunbittern, kagu, tropicbirds)
          - Aequornithes (core waterbirds)
        - Telluraves (core landbirds)
          - Afroaves
          - Australaves

Prum et al. (2015)

- - Strisores (hummingbirds, swifts, nightbirds)
  - - - Columbaves
        - Columbimorphae (pigeons, mesites, sandgrouse)
        - Otidimorphae (cuckoos, bustards, turacos)
    - - Gruiformes (cranes, rails)
      - - Aequorlitornithes (waterbirds)
          - - Mirandornithes (flamingoes, grebes)
            - Charadriiformes (shorebirds)
          - Phaethoquornithes
            - Eurypygimorphae (sunbittern, kagu, tropicbirds)
            - Aequornithes (core waterbirds)
        - Inopinaves
          - Opisthocomiformes (hoatzin)
          - Telluraves (core landbirds)

Suh (2016) — a hard polytomy

- - Mirandornithes (flamingoes, grebes)
  - Columbimorphae (pigeons, mesites, sandgrouse)
  - Otidimorphae (cuckoos, bustards, turacos)
  - Strisores (hummingbirds, swifts, nightbirds)
  - Opisthocomiformes (hoatzin)
  - Gruiformes (cranes, rails)
  - Charadriiformes (shorebirds)
  - Phaethoquornithes
    - Eurypygimorphae (sunbittern, kagu, tropicbirds)
    - Aequornithes (core waterbirds)
  - Telluraves (core landbirds)
    - Afroaves
    - Australaves

Reddy et al. (2017)

- - Columbea
    - Mirandornithes (flamingos, grebes)
    - Columbimorphae (pigeons, mesites, sandgrouse)
  - Passerea
    - - Otidimorphae (cuckoos, bustards)
      - - - Musophagiformes (turacos)
          - Gruiformes (cranes, rails)
        - Aequornithes (core waterbirds)
    - - - Charadriiformes (shorebirds)
        - - Opisthocomiformes (hoatzin)
          - - Strisores (hummingbirds, swifts, nightbirds)
            - - Eurypygimorphae (sunbittern, kagu, tropicbirds)
              - Telluraves (core landbirds)

Houde et al. (2019) —polytomy in Passerea

- - Columbea
    - Mirandornithes (flamingos, grebes)
    - Columbimorphae (pigeons, mesites, sandgrouse)
  - Passerea
    - - Otidimorphae (cuckoos, bustards, turacos)
      - - Strisores (hummingbirds, swifts, nightbirds)
        - Opisthocomiformes (hoatzin)
        - Charadriiformes (shorebirds)
        - Gruiformes (cranes, rails)
        - - Phaethoquornithes
            - Eurypygimorphae (sunbittern, kagu, tropicbirds)
            - Aequornithes (core waterbirds)
        - Telluraves (core landbirds)

Kuhl et al. (2021)

- - Mirandornithes (flamingos, grebes)
  - - - - - Columbaves
            - Columbimorphae
              - Pteroclimesites (sandgrouse, mesites)
              - - Columbiformes (pigeons)
                - Cuculiformes (cuckoos)
            - Musophagotides (turacos, bustards)
          - - Strisores (hummingbirds, swifts, nightbirds)
            - Opisthocomiformes (hoatzin)
        - - Gruimorphae
            - Gruiformes (cranes, rails)
            - Charadriiformes (shorebirds)
    - - Phaethoquornithes
        - Eurypygimorphae (sunbittern, kagu, tropicbirds)
        - Aequornithes (core waterbirds)
      - Telluraves (core landbirds)

Braun & Kimball (2021) — soft polytomies at the base of Neoaves and in Passerea

- - Mirandornithes (flamingos, grebes)
  - Columbimorphae (pigeons, sandgrouse, mesites)
  - Passerea
    - Otidimorphae (bustards and cuckoos without turacos)
    - Musophagiformes (turacos)
    - Strisores (hummingbirds, swifts, nightbirds)
    - Opisthocomiformes (hoatzin)
    - Gruiformes (cranes, rails)
    - Charadriiformes (shorebirds)
    - Phaethoquornithes
      - Eurypygimorphae (sunbittern, kagu, tropicbirds)
      - Aequornithes (core waterbirds)
    - Telluraves (core landbirds)

Wu et al. (2024)

- - Aquaterraves
    - - Columbaves
        - Columbimorphae (pigeons, sandgrouse, mesites)
        - Otidimorphae (bustards, turacos, cuckoos)
    - - Litusilvanae
        - Strisores (hummingbirds, swifts, nightbirds)
        - Gruimorphae (Cursorimorphae)
          - Gruiformes (cranes, rails)
          - Charadriiformes (shorebirds)
      - Aequorlitornithes
        - Mirandornithes (flamingos, grebes)
        - - Opisthocomiformes (hoatzin)
          - Phaethoquornithes
            - Eurypygimorphae (sunbittern, kagu, tropicbirds)
            - Aequornithes (core waterbirds)
  - Telluraves (core landbirds)

Stiller et al (2024)

- - Mirandornithes (flamingos, grebes)
  - - - Columbaves
        - Columbimorphae (pigeons, sandgrouse, mesites)
        - Otidimorphae (bustards, turacos, cuckoos)
    - - Elementaves
        - Gruae
          - Opisthocomiformes (hoatzin)
          - Gruimorphae (Cursorimorphae)
            - Gruiformes (cranes, rails)
            - Charadriiformes (shorebirds)
        - - Strisores (hummingbirds, swifts, nightbirds)
          - Phaethoquornithes
            - Eurypygimorphae (sunbittern, kagu, tropicbirds)
            - Aequornithes (core waterbirds)
      - Telluraves (core landbirds)

=== Taxa above the magnificent seven and three orphaned orders ===
These are controversial, and some contradict each other. Phaethoquornithes seems to be the best-supported one.

- Aequorlitornithes
- Aquaterraves
- Columbaves
- Columbea
- Elementaves
- Inopinaves
- Gruae
- Gruimorphae
- Litusilvanae
- Otidae
- Passerea
- Phaethoquornithes
