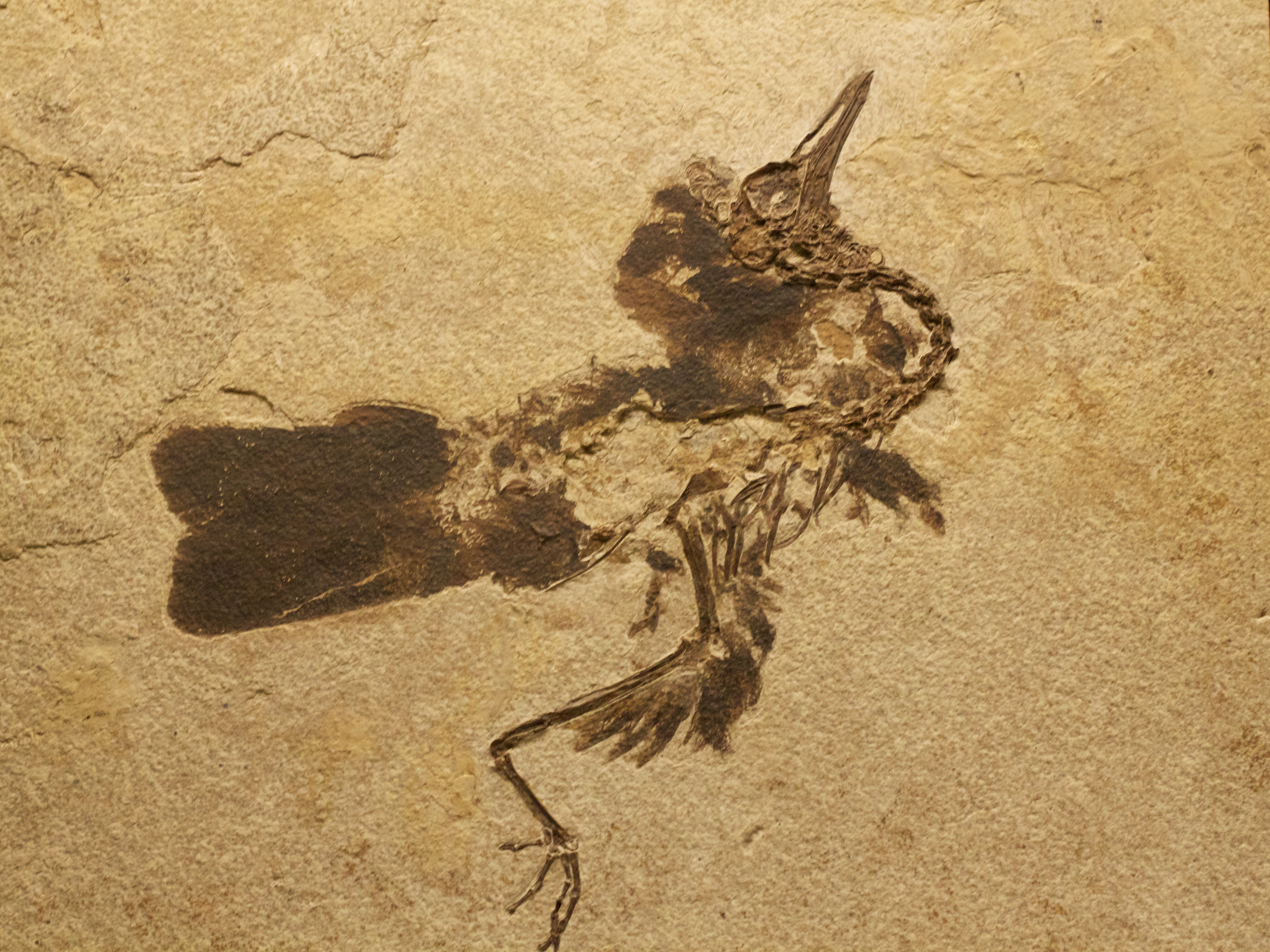
- Fossil of Nahmavis grandei

Scientific classification
- Kingdom: Animalia
- Phylum: Chordata
- Class: Aves
- Clade: Gruimorphae
- Order: Charadriiformes (?)
- Genus: †Nahmavis; Musser & Clarke, 2020

Type species
- †Nahmavis grandei (Musser & Clarke, 2020)

= Nahmavis =

Nahmavis Temporal range: Early Eocene

Extinct genus of birds

Nahmavis is genus of prehistoric birds that could be related to Gruiformes and Charadriiformes. It is known from the Early Eocene Green River Formation (Fossil Butte Member) of Wyoming.
