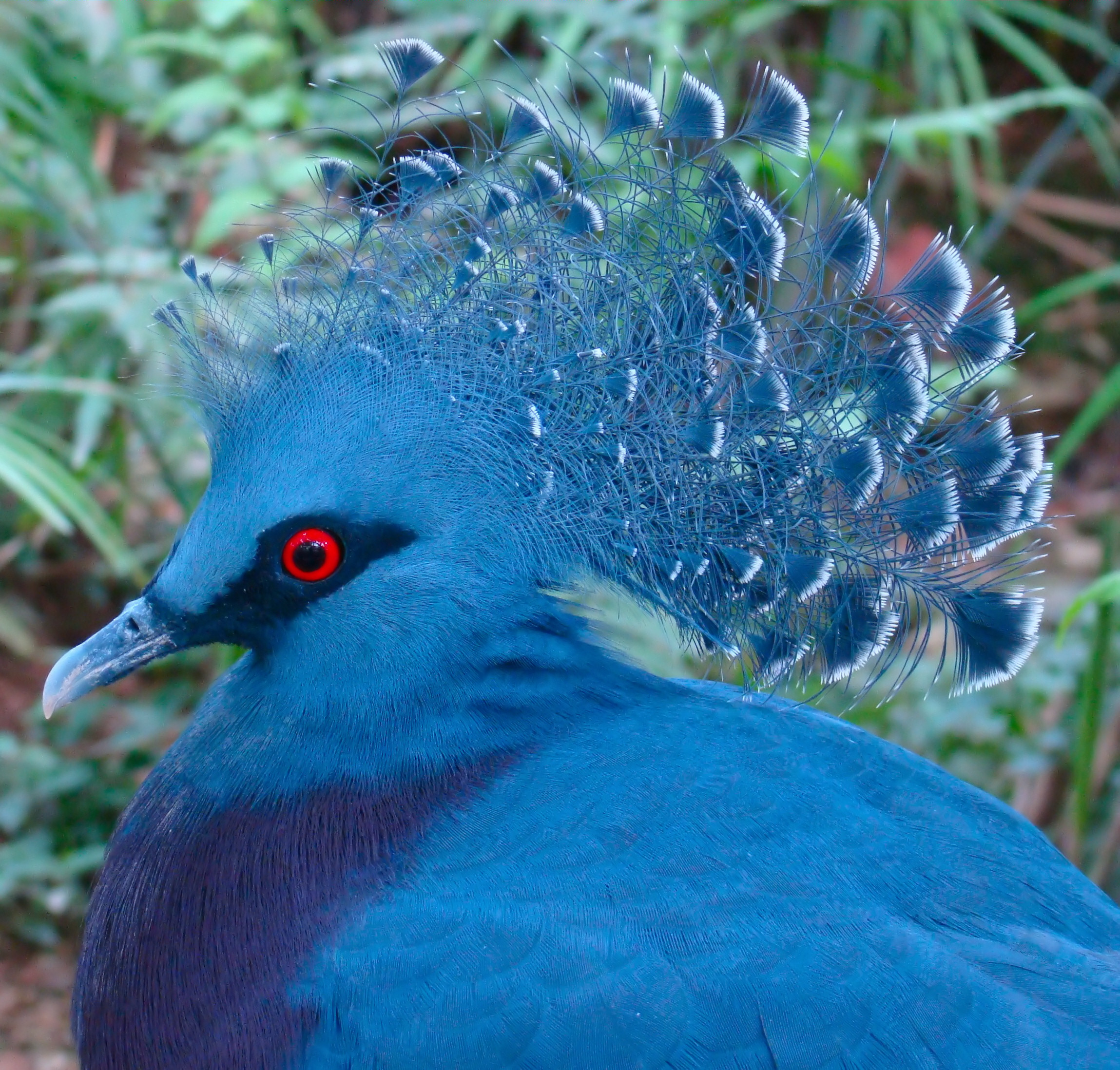
- Victoria crowned pigeon (Goura victoria)
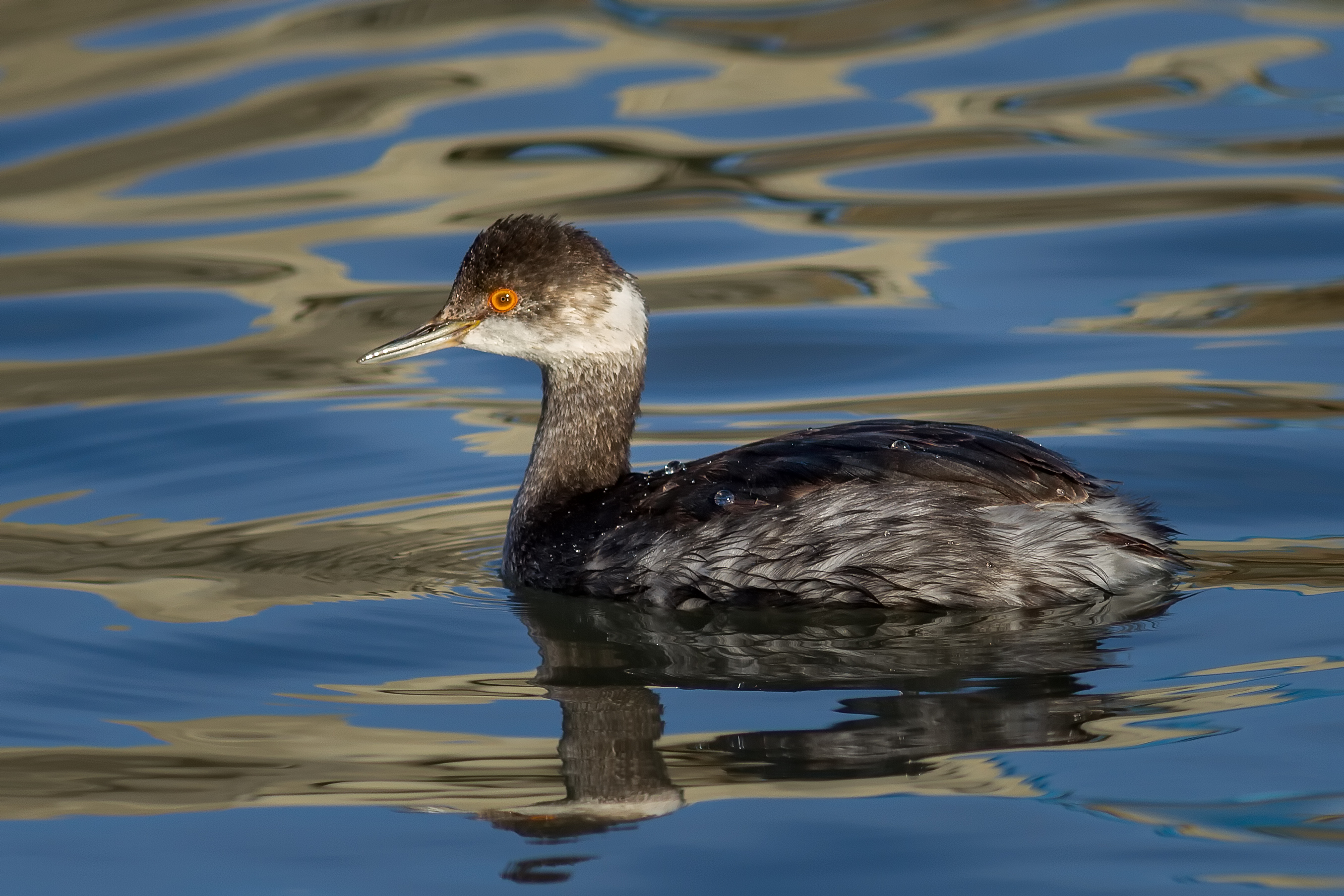
- Black-necked Grebe (Podiceps nigricollis)

Scientific classification
- Kingdom: Animalia
- Phylum: Chordata
- Class: Aves
- Infraclass: Neognathae
- Clade: Neoaves
- (unranked): Columbea; Jarvis et al., 2014

Clades
- Columbimorphae; Mirandornithes

= Columbea =

Columbea Temporal range: Eocene–Recent

Taxon of birds

Columbea is a taxon suggested by genome analysis that contains Columbiformes (pigeons and doves), Pteroclidae (sandgrouse), Mesitornithidae (mesites) and Mirandornithes (flamingos and grebes). Until their recent placement as the sister taxon to Passerea, in the last decade various genetic analysis found them to be in the obsolete clade Metaves.

- Columbea
  - Mirandornithes (Phoenicopterimorphae)
    - Phoenicopteriformes (flamingos)
    - Podicipediformes (grebes)
  - Columbimorphae
    - Columbiformes (pigeons and doves)
    - - Pterocliformes (sandgrouse)
      - Mesitornithiformes (mesites)
