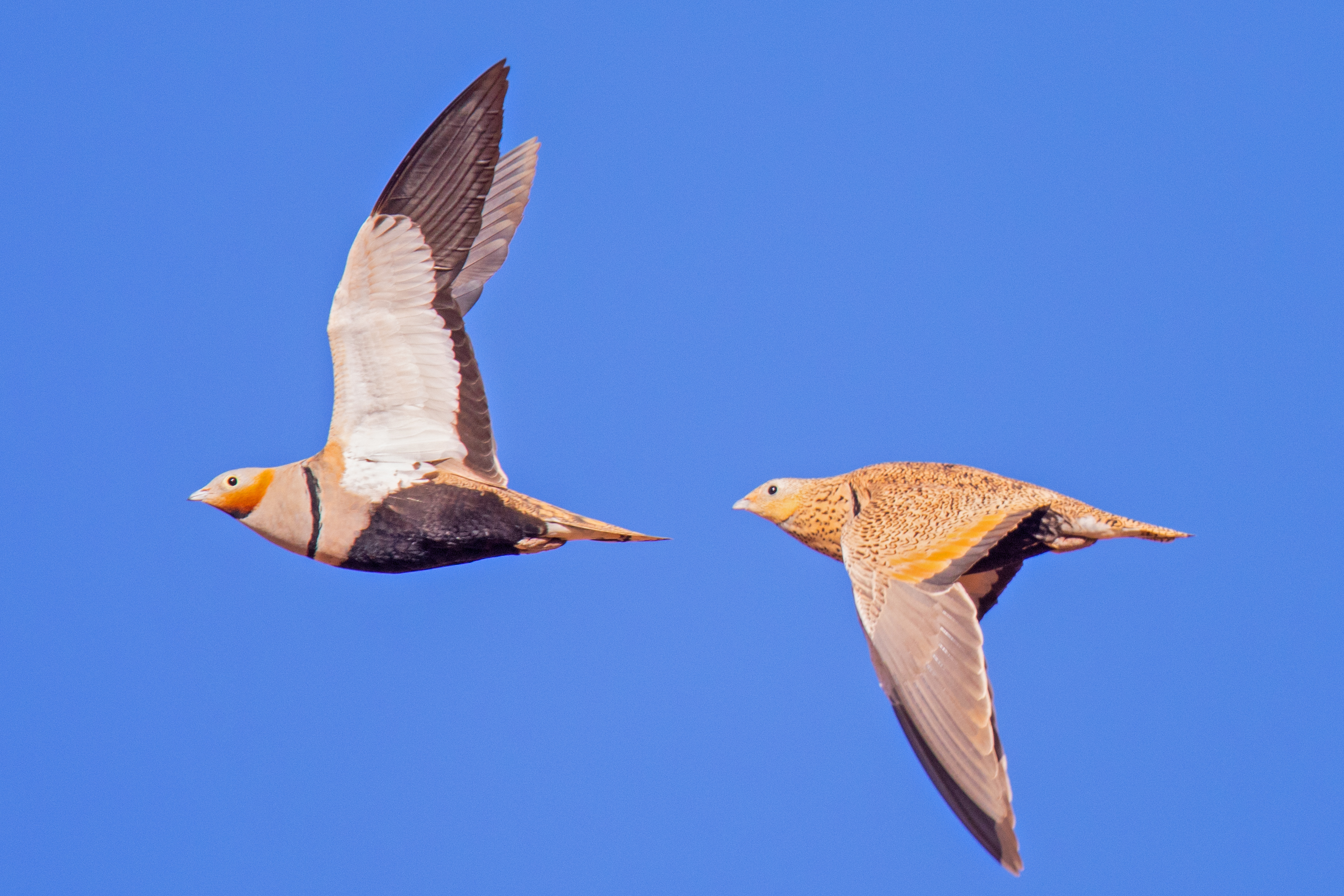

Conservation status
- Least Concern (IUCN 3.1)

Scientific classification
- Kingdom: Animalia
- Phylum: Chordata
- Class: Aves
- Order: Pterocliformes
- Family: Pteroclidae
- Genus: Pterocles
- Species: P. orientalis

Binomial name
- Pterocles orientalis (Linnaeus, 1758)

Synonyms
- Tetrao orientalis Linnaeus, 1758

= Black-bellied sandgrouse =

Species of bird

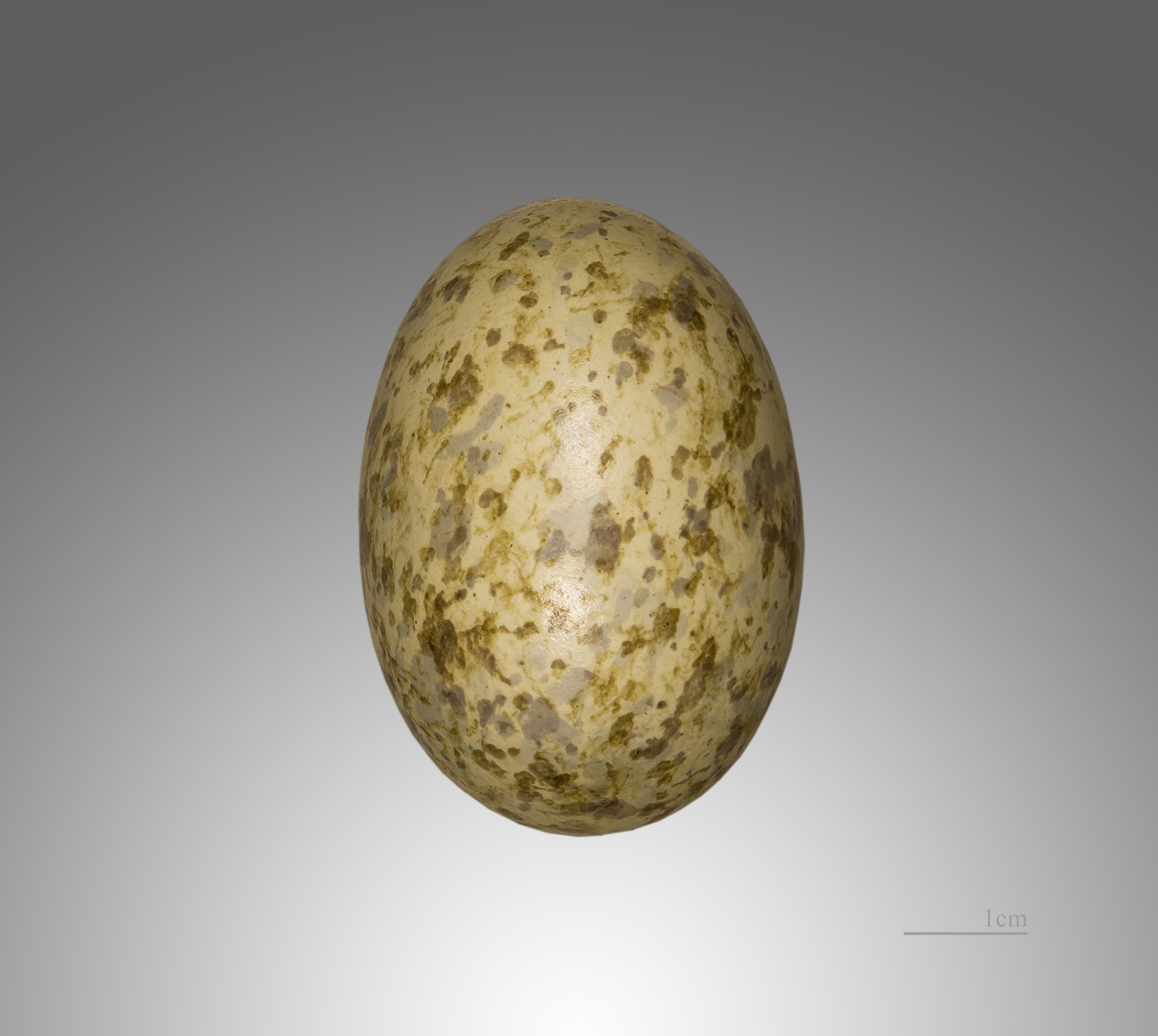
Egg

The black-bellied sandgrouse (Pterocles orientalis) is a medium large bird in the sandgrouse family.

The nominate race breeds in Iberian Peninsula , Northwest Africa, the Canary Islands, Turkey, Iran, Cyprus and Palestine. The eastern form P. o. arenarius (Pallas, 1775) is found in Kazakhstan, western China and northern Pakistan. It is a partial migrant, with central Asian birds moving to Pakistan and northern India in winter.

== Taxonomy ==
The black-bellied sandgrouse was formally described by the Swedish naturalist Carl Linnaeus in 1758 in the tenth edition of his Systema Naturae. He placed it with all the other grouse-like birds in the genus Tetrao and coined the binomial name Tetrao orientalis. The black-bellied sandgrouse is now placed with 13 other species in the genus Pterocles that was introduced in 1815 by the Dutch zoologist Coenraad Jacob Temminck. The genus name combines the Ancient Greek pteron meaning "wing" with -klēs meaning "notable" or "splendid".

Two subspecies are recognised:

- P. o. orientalis (Linnaeus, 1758) – Canary Islands, Iberian Peninsula, Morocco to west Iran
- P. o. arenarius (Pallas, 1775) – Kazakhstan to south Iran and Afghanistan, east to northwest China

== Description ==
The black-bellied sandgrouse is 33–39 cm (13–15 in) long and weighs 300–615 g (10.6–21.7 oz), it is likely the largest species in the sandgrouse family. The male has a grey head, neck, and breast. The underparts are black and the upperparts are golden-brown with darker markings. There is a thin black border around the lower breast and a chestnut throat patch. This sandgrouse has a small, pigeon-like head and neck, but a stocky compact body. It has long pointed wings and a fast direct flight. The white underwings and black belly make this species easy to identify while in flight. Flocks fly to watering holes at dawn.

The female has browner, more finely marked upper parts, including the head and the breast. The underparts and breast band are identical to the male. The eastern race is paler and heavier than orientalis. Males have yellower upperparts and greyer underparts than the western form. Females are whiter below, but often inseparable. The call is a soft chowrrr rrrr-rrrr.

== Distribution and habitat ==
This gregarious species breeds on dry open plains and similar habitats, but unlike the pin-tailed sandgrouse, it avoids areas completely lacking in vegetation. Its nest is a ground scrape into which three greenish eggs with cryptic markings are laid. Both sexes incubate, but only the male brings water.

== Fossil record ==
Fossils of the black-bellied sandgrouse are known from the Nefud Desert of Saudi Arabia and date back to the Middle Pleistocene, about 500,000 BP.

== In literature ==
In the Chagatai language memoir Baburnama, the Mughal emperor Babur calls the Pterocles orientalis arenarius the qīl-qūyirūgh "horse-tail" and describing it as the "bāghrī qarā of Transoxiana".
