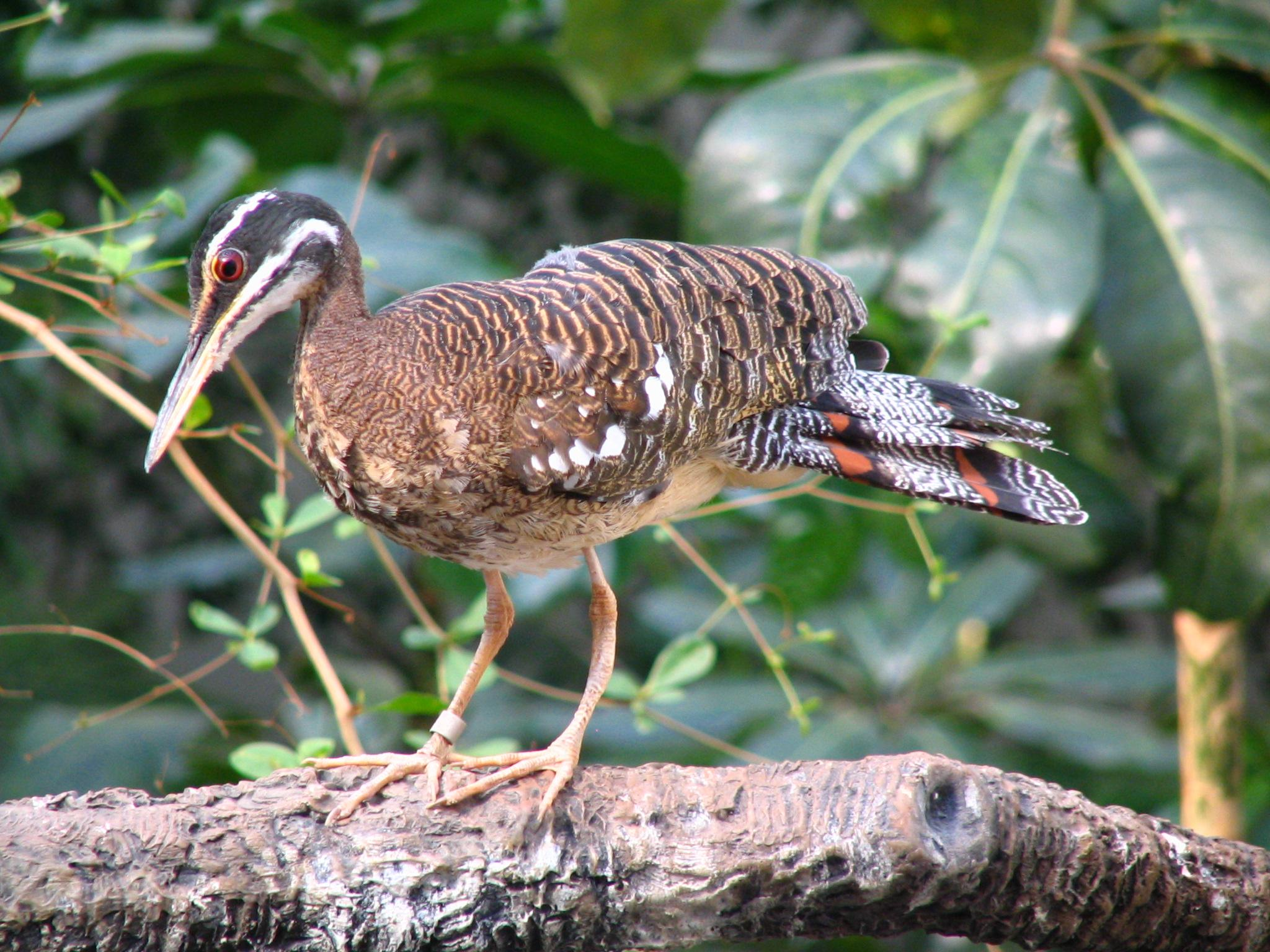
- Sunbittern (Eurypyga helias)

Scientific classification
- Domain: Eukaryota
- Kingdom: Animalia
- Phylum: Chordata
- Class: Aves
- Clade: Neoaves
- Clade: Metaves; Fain & Houde, 2004

Subgroups
- Columbimorphae; Mirandornithes; Eurypygimorphae; Strisores

= Metaves =

Metavians

Clade of birds

Metaves ("other birds") is a controversial group proposed by Fain & Houde (2004) and later rescued on the studies of Ericson et al. (2006) and Hackett et al. (2008). This group consists of several lineages that diversified early in Neornithes evolution. These lineages include Strisores (hummingbirds, swifts, nightjars and allies), pigeons, sandgrouses, mesites, Eurypygae (sunbittern and kagu), tropicbirds and Mirandornithes (flamingos and grebes), but the exact members of Metaves and their relationship differs between those studies, and the group is only supported by the β-fibrinogen gene.
