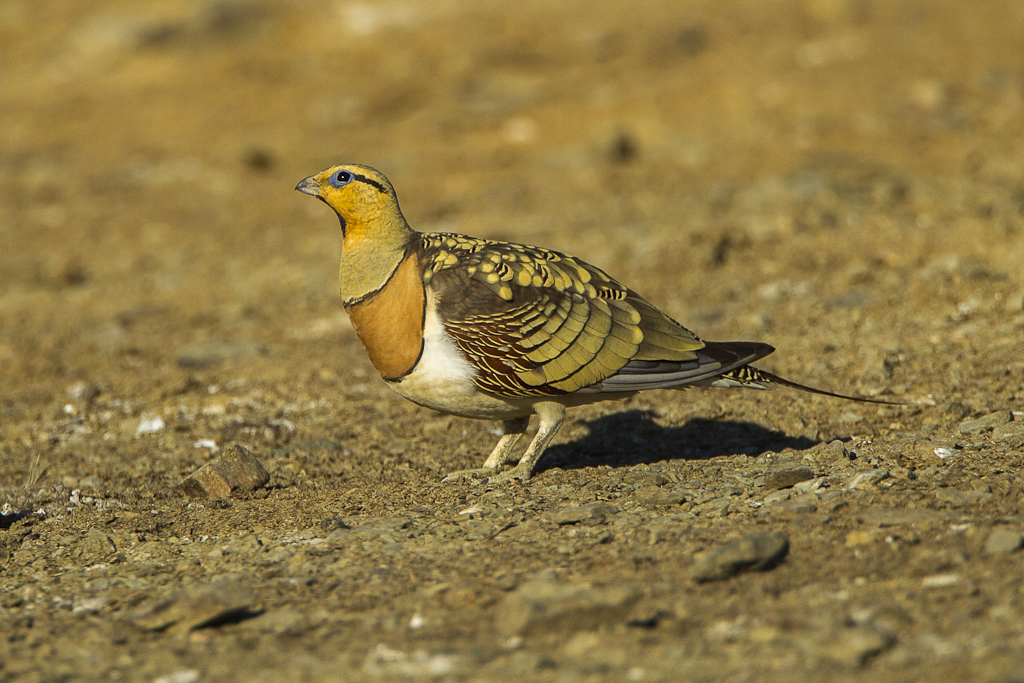

Conservation status
- Least Concern (IUCN 3.1)

Scientific classification
- Kingdom: Animalia
- Phylum: Chordata
- Class: Aves
- Order: Pterocliformes
- Family: Pteroclidae
- Genus: Pterocles
- Species: P. alchata

Binomial name
- Pterocles alchata (Linnaeus, 1766)

Synonyms
- Tetrao alchata Linnaeus, 1766

= Pin-tailed sandgrouse =

Species of bird

The pin-tailed sandgrouse (Pterocles alchata) is a medium large bird in the sandgrouse family. It has a small, pigeon-like head and neck and a sturdy, compact body. It has long pointed wings, which are white underneath, a long tail and a fast direct flight. Flocks fly to watering holes at dawn. The call is a loud kattar-kattar. This gregarious species breeds on dry open treeless plains and similar habitats. Its nest is a ground scrape into which two or three cream-coloured eggs with cryptic markings are laid. Both sexes incubate the eggs.

The pin-tailed sandgrouse is about 35 centimetres (14 in) long. Its head and upperparts are yellowish-green. The underparts are white with a chestnut breast band separating the belly from the green neck. Sexes are somewhat similar, but the female is better camouflaged and has a shorter tail than the male. There are two subspecies; P. a. alchata breeds in southern Europe and P. a. caudacutus breeds in northwestern Africa, the Middle East and southeastern Asia. It is a partial migrant, with some Asian birds moving to the Middle East and northern Pakistan in winter. Males of the eastern race have duller underparts than the European birds, and the females have white, rather than yellow, wing coverts.

== Taxonomy ==
There are two subspecies. The nominate race, P. a. alchata, breeds in Iberia and southern France, and the eastern form P. a. caudacutus (Gmelin, 1774) is found in northwest Africa, and from southeast Turkey east to Kazakhstan.

The species name alchata is thought to be derived from the Arabic name al-gata القطا which is derived from the call of the bird.

== Description ==
The pin-tailed sandgrouse is a robust, medium-sized bird about 31 to 39 centimetres (12 to 15 in) in length. The general colouring is cryptic, a blend of barred and flecked olive green, brown, buff, yellow, grey and black. The underparts and the feathered legs are dull white.

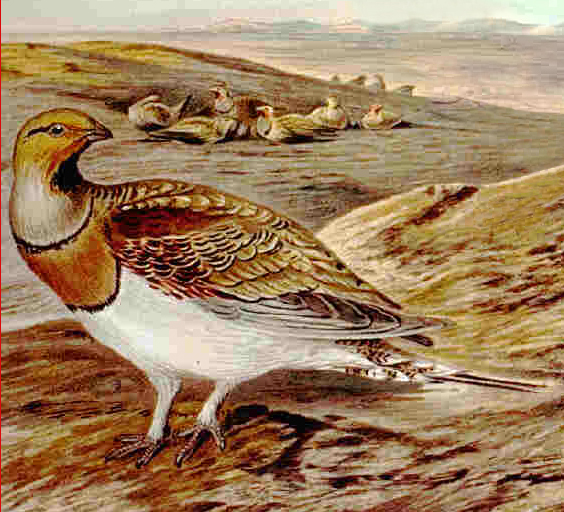
Pin-tailed sandgrouse

The sexes are different and the male's plumage varies with the time of year. In the breeding season, the male has the crown, most of the neck, the back and under-wing coverts a yellowish-green colour with dull yellow spots in the shoulder region. The cheeks are also yellow with a narrow black line extending from the beak, through the eye to the nape of the neck. The irises are brown and the beak is slatey grey. There is a black patch on the throat immediately below the beak and below this, there is a broad, reddish-brown band round the breast, bordered by a thin black stripe above and below the band. The outer wing coverts are chestnut edged with black and white and the primaries are black with pale edges which gives both the leading and trailing edges of the wing the appearance of a black rim in flight. The rump and the tail are distinctly barred in black and brownish-yellow and the streamers on the central tail feathers are slate-grey. Outside the breeding season, all the upper parts, including the crown and cheeks, are barred in black and brownish-yellow and the throat loses its black patch, becoming whitish.

The female is generally similar to the male but the colours are duller. The cheeks and neck are golden-buff and lack the greenish tinge of the male. There is a black stripe running through the eye. The chin is white and there is an additional yellow-buff band across the breast with a broad black stripe above, another thinner one about a third of the way down and a further narrow black stripe at the base. The back and wings are grey, barred with black. The rump and the tail (which has shorter central feathers than the male) are similar in colouration to the male but have finer black barrings.

In flight, the pin-tailed sandgrouse can be identified by its bright, white underparts and under-wing coverts, and the long feathers in the centre part of its tail. It is usually silent when on the ground but in the air communicates with other birds with a frequently uttered, loud "kattar-kattar", a nasal "ga-ga-ga" and a low-pitched "gang gang".

== Distribution and habitat ==
The pin-tailed sandgrouse breeds in North Africa and the Middle East, Turkey, Iran, Iraq and Kazakhstan. In Europe it breeds in Spain, Portugal and the southern part of France. Eastern populations, particularly those from Kazakhstan, migrate to Pakistan and parts of northern India in winter.

The pin-tailed sandgrouse inhabits open areas of stony land, semi arid areas at the edge of deserts, treeless plains and occasionally dried-out mud flats. In winter it may visit ploughed or fallow land but prefers sandy soils and is much less reliant on vegetation cover than the black-bellied sandgrouse (Pterocles orientalis) which has a similar range. It does not occur at elevations above about 1,000 metres (3,300 ft).

== Behaviour ==
The pin-tailed sandgrouse often feeds in groups and gathers regularly in large numbers at waterholes, to which the birds fly soon after dawn. During the day they disperse to forage for seeds, which are the main part of their diet, and also eat buds, green shoots and leaves. They favour leguminous seeds and also eat seeds of knotweed (Polygonum), buckwheat (Fagopyrum), Salicornia, Artemisia, camelthorn (Alhagi), rock rose (Helianthemum) and asphodel (Asphodelus). In cultivated areas they take grain and the seeds of leguminous crops. Beetles and other small invertebrates are sometimes eaten and grit is consumed to help grind up the contents of the crop.

== Breeding ==
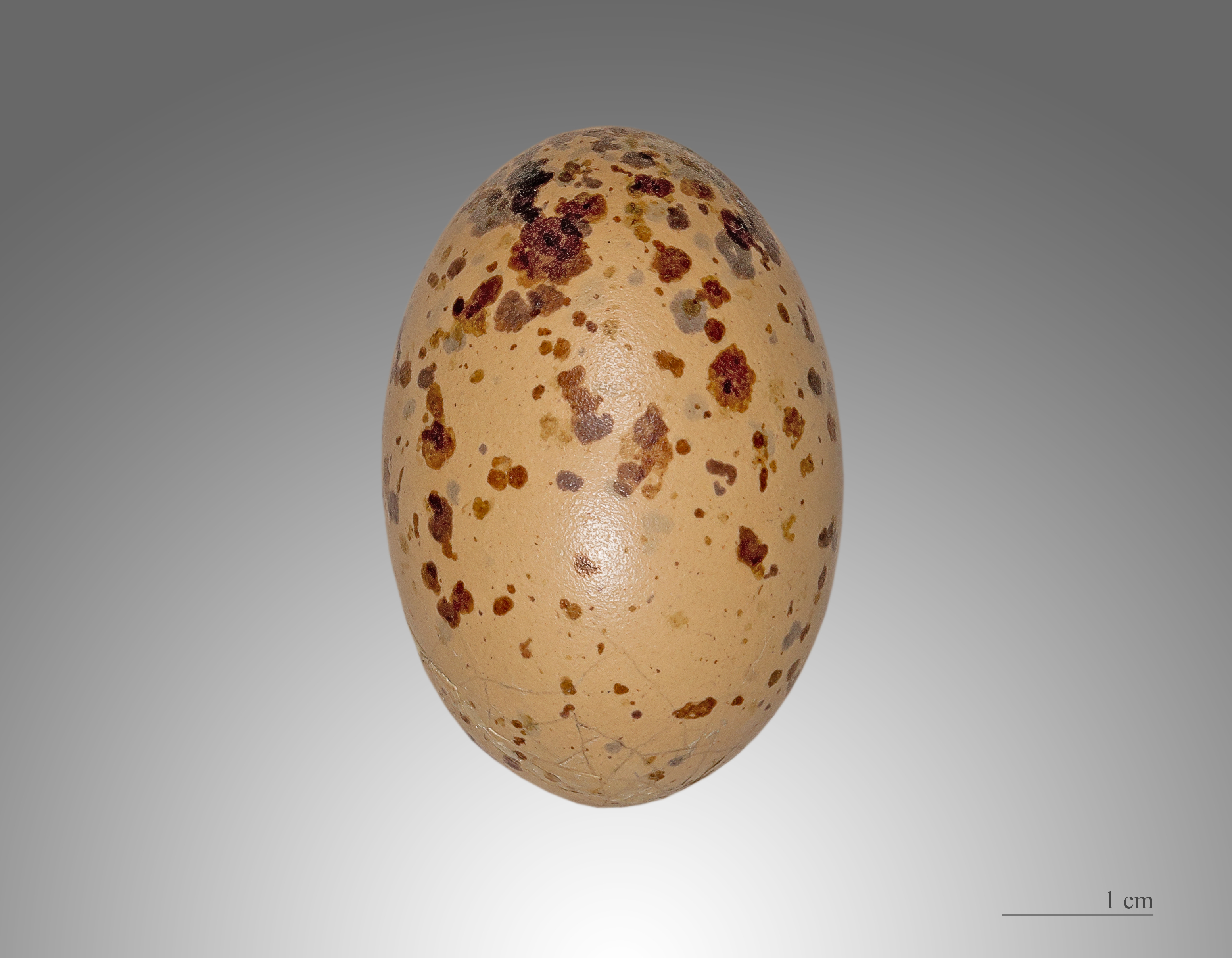
Egg

The pin-tailed sandgrouse nests in a slight depression on the ground in the open. Two or three eggs are laid at intervals of two days, creamy-brown spotted with darker brown, reddish-brown and grey. Both parents share the task of incubation which lasts from nineteen to twenty five days. The male starts his shift about an hour before sunset and the female takes over after she has been to the waterhole in the morning. The young are precocial and leave the nest soon after they have hatched. Both parents care for them but only the male is involved in bringing them water, absorbed by the feathers on his breast. The chicks are able to feed themselves by the age of a week and can fly by the time they are four weeks old. They are dependent on their parents for two months and attain their adult plumage at about four months. There is normally a single brood each year but if the eggs are destroyed or removed, more eggs may be laid.

== Status ==
The pin-tailed sandgrouse is rated as being of "Least Concern" by BirdLife International. This is because it has a large range and the population, estimated to be somewhere between 130,000 and 1,500,000 individuals, is believed to be stable. The range may be expanding in south eastern Turkey, possibly as a result of changes in climate. However, the populations in parts of Europe are decreasing due to changes in agricultural production. The bird remains common in Spain but in the only remaining locality in southern France where it is found, at La Crau, only about 170 pairs remained in 2002, while there were fewer than 100 pairs of birds breeding in Portugal in the same year.
