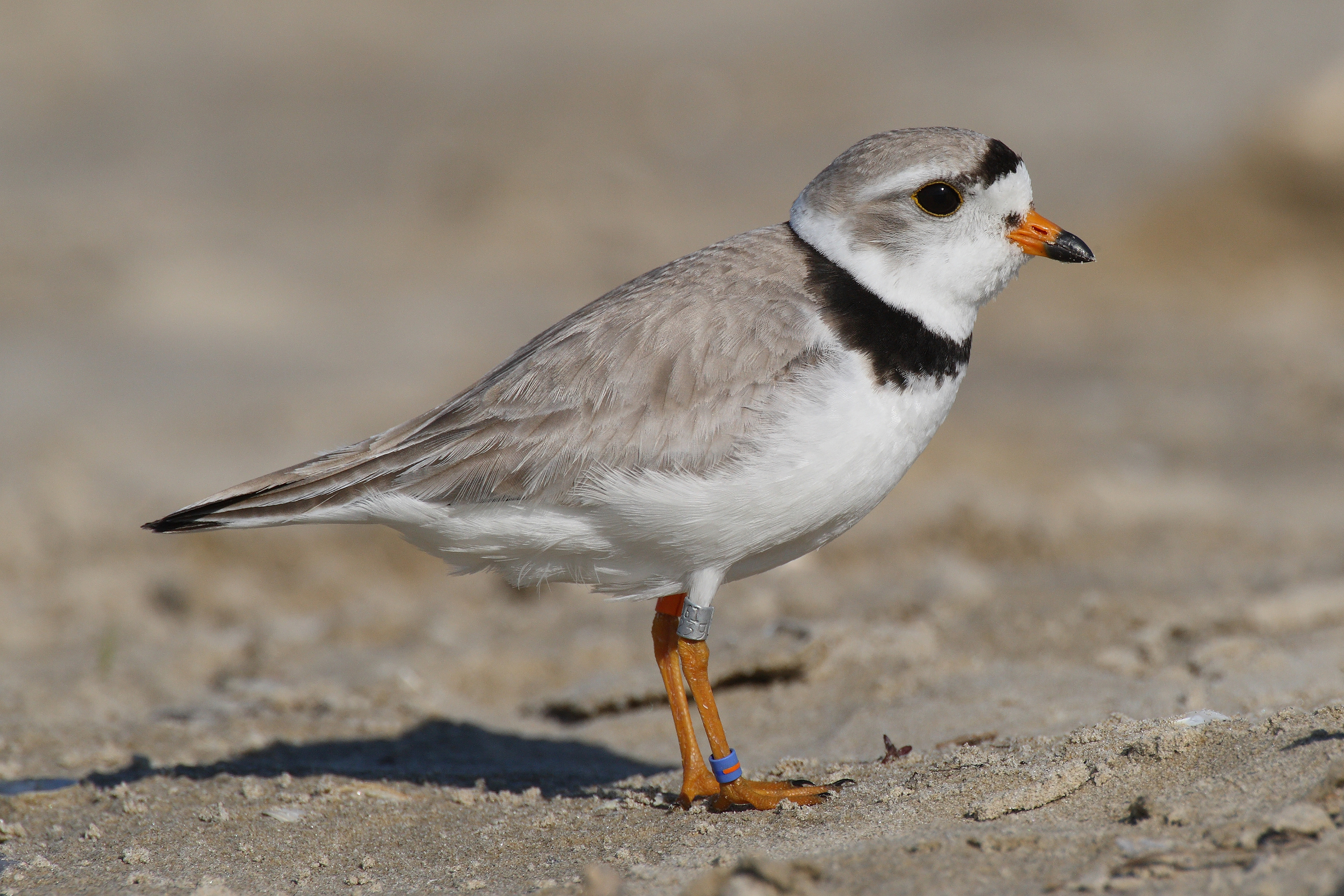
- Piping plover (Charadrius melodus)
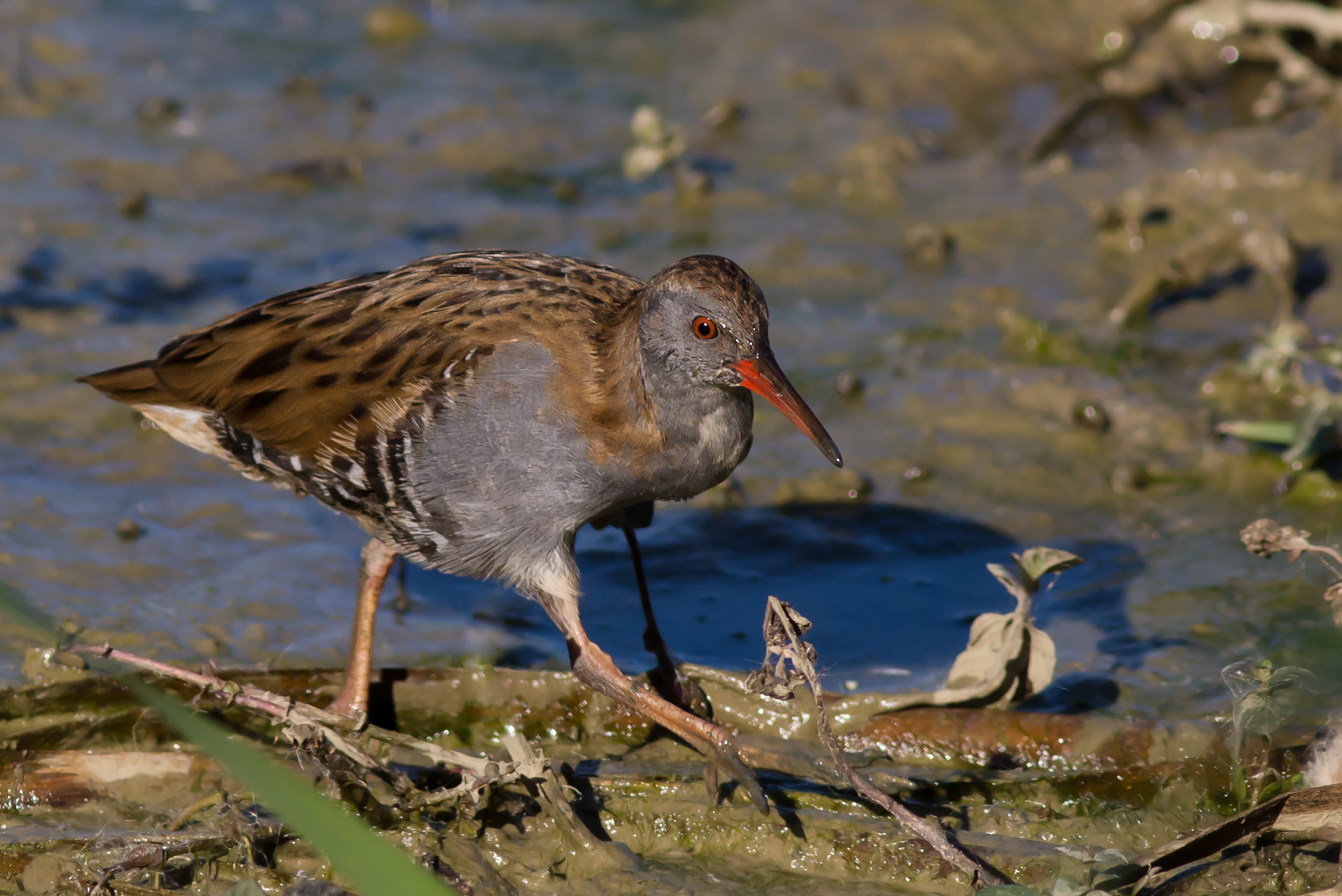
- Water rail (Rallus aquaticus)

Scientific classification
- Kingdom: Animalia
- Phylum: Chordata
- Class: Aves
- Infraclass: Neognathae
- Clade: Neoaves
- Clade: Elementaves
- (unranked): Gruae
- Clade: Gruimorphae; Bonaparte, 1854

Orders
- Charadriiformes; Gruiformes

Synonyms
- Charadriimorphae; Gruicharadriae

= Gruimorphae =

Gruimorphae Temporal range: Paleocene - Holocene 60–0 Ma Possibly an earlier origin based on molecular clock

Taxon of birds

Gruimorphae is a taxon of birds that contains the orders Charadriiformes (plovers, gulls, and allies) and Gruiformes (cranes and rails) identified by molecular analysis. This grouping has had historical support, as various charadriiform families such as the families Pedionomidae and Turnicidae were classified as gruiforms. It may also have support from the fossil record since the discovery of Nahmavis from the Early Eocene of North America.

The relationship between these birds is due to similar anatomical and behavioral characteristics. A morphological study went further to suggest that the gruiforms might be paraphyletic in respect to the shorebirds, with the rails being closely related to the buttonquails.
