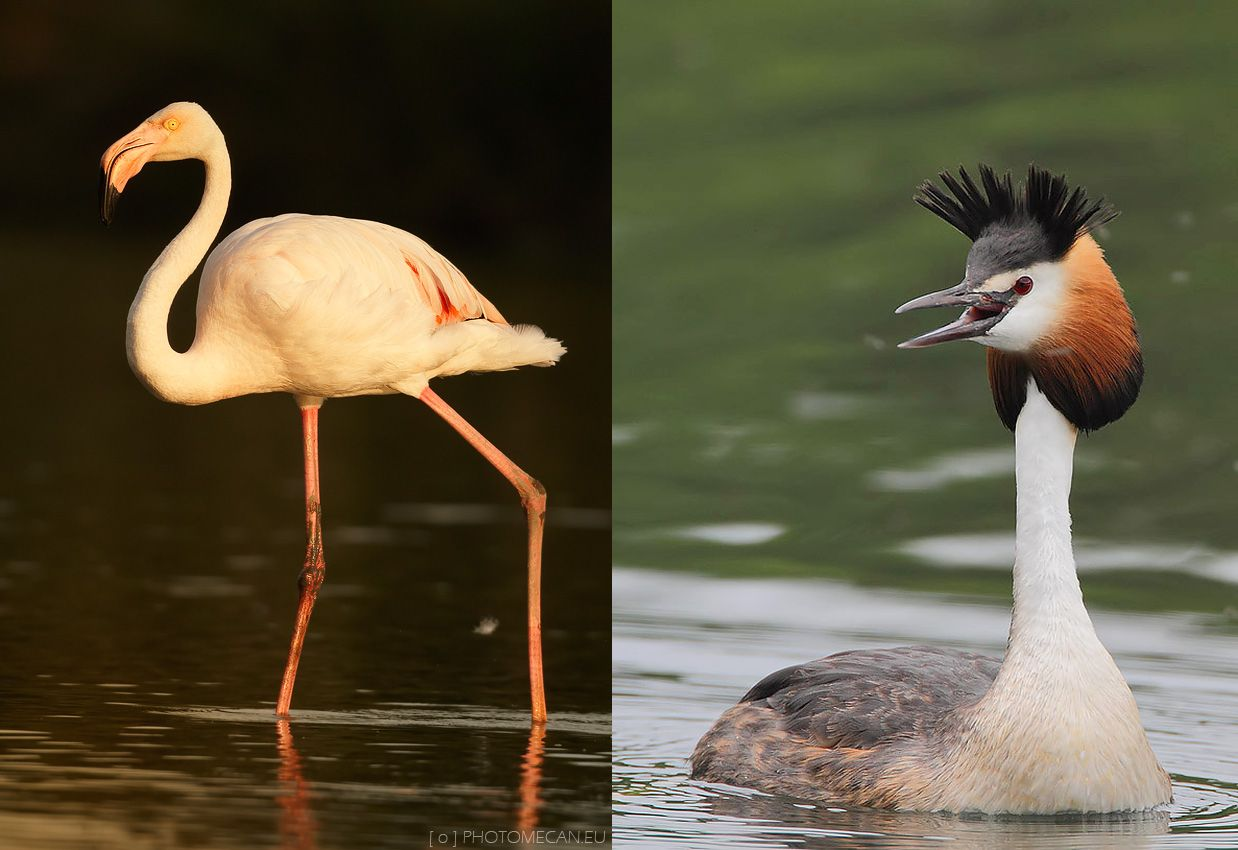
- Greater flamingo (Phoenicopterus roseus) and great crested grebe (Podiceps cristatus)

Scientific classification
- Kingdom: Animalia
- Phylum: Chordata
- Class: Aves
- Clade: Neoaves
- Clade: Mirandornithes; Sangster, 2005

Subclades
- †Juncitarsus; †Kashinia; Podicipediformes; Phoenicopteriformes

Synonyms
- Phoenicopteriformes Fürbringer, 1888 sensu Dickinson & Remsen, 2013; Phoenicopterimorphae Cracraft, 2013

= Mirandornithes =

Mirandornithes Temporal range: Early Miocene-Recent, 23–0 Ma Possible an early origin based on molecular clock

Taxon of birds

Mirandornithes (/mɪˌrændɔːrˈnɪθiːz/) is a clade that consists of flamingos and grebes. Many scholars use the term Phoenicopterimorphae for the superorder containing flamingoes and grebes.

Determining the relationships between the two groups has been problematic. Flamingos had been placed with numerous branches within Neognathae, such as ducks and storks. The grebes had been placed with the loons. However, more recent genomic studies have confirmed these two branches as sister groups.

Both primitive phoenicopteriformes and their closest relatives, the grebes, were highly aquatic. This indicates that the entire mirandornithe group evolved from aquatic, probably swimming ancestors.

== Etymology ==
The term was coined by Sangster in 2005 to describe the new clade discovered through molecular analyses. It is inspired by the Latin mirandus, meaning 'wonderful', and the Ancient Greek ὄρνῑς (órnīs, weak stem ὄρνῑθ- (órnīth-)), meaning 'bird'.

== Synapomorphies ==
According to Mayr (2004) and Sangster (2005), there are at least twelve distinct morphological synapomorphies that are unique to this clade:

1. "At least the fourth to seventh cervical vertebrae strongly elongate, with processus spinosus forming a marked ridge.
2. Humerus with a marked oval depression at the insertion site of the musculus scapulohumeralis cranialis.
3. At least 23 presacral vertebrae.
4. At least four thoracic vertebrae fused to a notarium.
5. Distal end of ulna with marked oval depression radialis.
6. Phalanx proximalis digiti majoris is very elongate and narrow craniocaudally.
7. Distal rim of condylus medialis of tibiotarsus distinctly notched.
8. Pars acetabularis of musculus iliotibialis lateralis absent.
9. Pars caudalis of musculus caudofemoralis absent.
10. Wing with 12 primaries
11. Left arteria carotis reduced or absent.
12. Eggs covered with a chalky layer of amorphous calcium phosphate."

== Systematics ==
Some authors have used alternative names for Mirandornithes, such as Phoenicopterimorphae or include Podicipedidae as a family within Phoenicopteriformes. Other authors do not widely use either option, and Mirandornithes is preferred. The following phylogenetic tree depicts Mirandornithes as recovered by Torres and colleagues in 2015.

- Mirandornithes
  - †Juncitarsus
  - - Podicipediformes
    - Phoenicopteriformes
      - †Palaelodidae
      - Phoenicopteridae

While various phylogenetic studies support the evidence for the sister grouping of flamingos and grebes, the placement of Mirandornithes has been less precise. Mayr (2004) conducted a morphological-based analysis on extant families. In his paper, Mayr found the then unnamed Mirandornithes to be part of a clade that included also loons and penguins, the former family being the sister lineage. Since 2004, however, this arrangement has not been supported, as with the advent of nuclear and mitochondrial genetic research, the placement of Mirandornithes has been placed all over the neoavian tree of life. The most common occurrences place the clade as either the basalmost branch of Neoaves, or as the sister taxon to Columbimorphae in a clade known as Columbea. A third option, one that has been the only constant correspondence between morphological and molecular studies of the placement of the clade, is a possible sister relationship to Charadriiformes.
