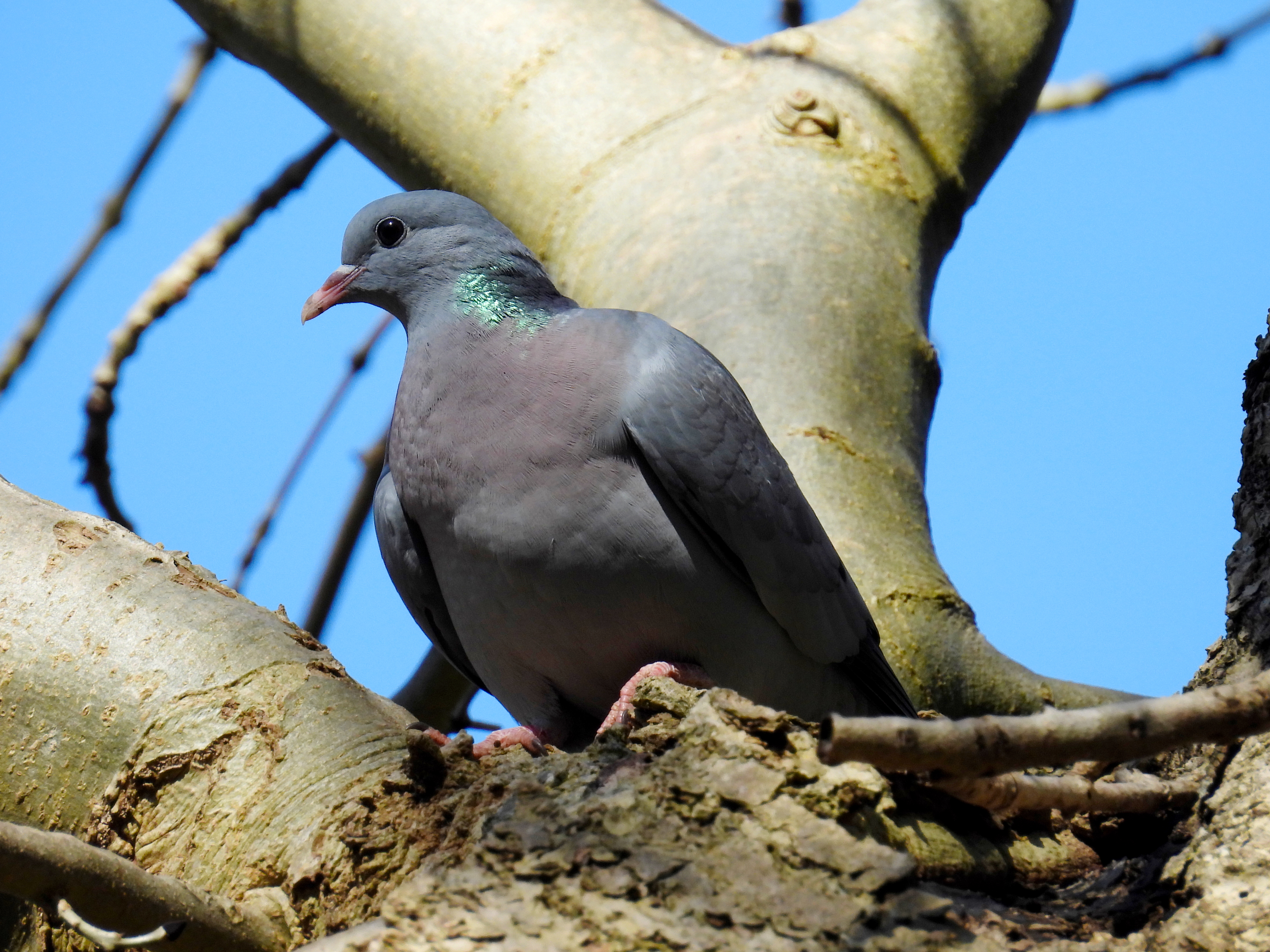
- Stock dove (Columba oenas)
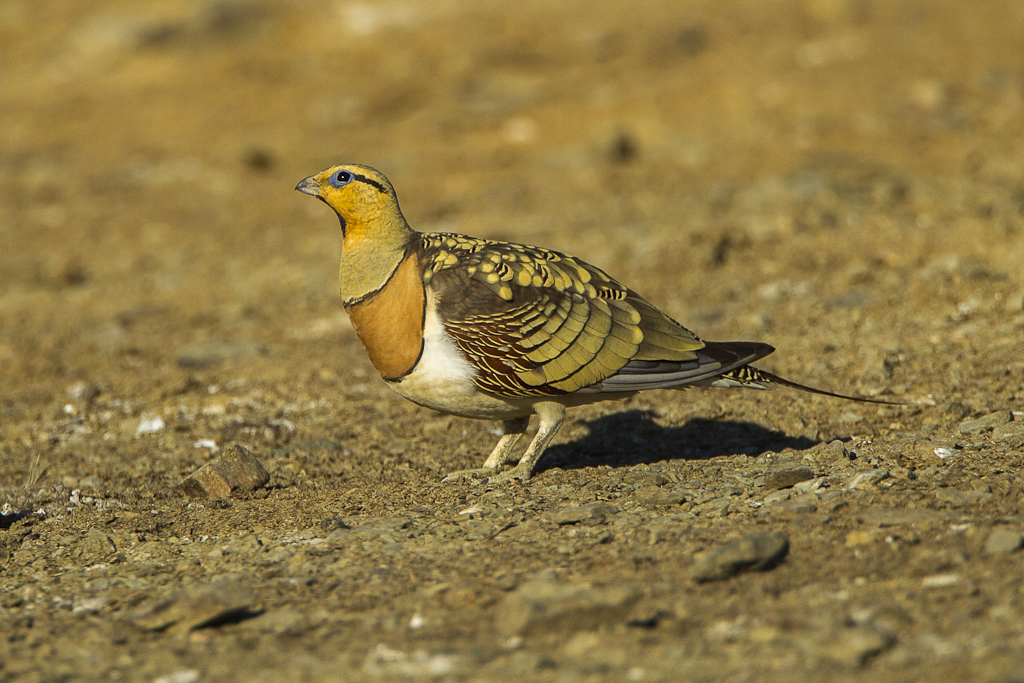
- Pin-tailed sandgrouse (Pterocles alchata)

Scientific classification
- Kingdom: Animalia
- Phylum: Chordata
- Class: Aves
- Clade: Columbaves
- Clade: Columbimorphae; Latham, 1790

Clades
- Columbiformes (pigeons and doves); Pteroclimesites Sangster et al., 2022; Pterocliformes (sandgrouse); Mesitornithiformes (mesites)

= Columbimorphae =

Columbimorphae Temporal range: Eocene–Holocene

Clade of birds

Columbimorphae is a clade/superorder discovered by genome analysis that includes birds of the orders Columbiformes (pigeons and doves), Pterocliformes (sandgrouse), and Mesitornithiformes (mesites). This group was defined in the PhyloCode by George Sangster and colleagues in 2022 as "the least inclusive crown clade containing Columba oenas, Mesitornis variegatus, and Pterocles alchata". Previous analyses had also recovered this grouping, although the exact relationships differed. Some studies indicated a sister relationship between sandgrouse and pigeons (the traditional view) while other studies indicated a sister grouping of mesites and sandgrouse instead. This sister relationship of the sandgrouse and mesites was named by George Sangster and colleagues in 2022 as the clade Pteroclimesites and defined in the PhyloCode as "the least inclusive crown clade containing Mesitornis variegatus and Pterocles alchata".

- Columbimorphae
  - Columbiformes (pigeons and doves)
  - Pteroclimesites
    - Pterocliformes (sandgrouse)
    - Mesitornithiformes (mesites)

In 2020 Kuhl et al. sequenced 3-prime untranslated region (3’UTR) from 429 species and 379 genera of birds.They have found that cuckoos are the sister group to pigeons within Columbimorphae as shown in the cladogram below:

- Columbimorphae
  - - Columbiformes (pigeons and doves)
    - Cuculiformes (cuckoos)
  - Pteroclimesites
    - Mesitornithiformes (mesites)
    - Pterocliformes (sandgrouse)

This is unlike most studies, which consider cuckoos to be related to turacos and bustards (part of the clade Otidimorphae). The six orders in Columbimorphae and Otidimorphae are sometimes considered to form a clade, Columbaves.
