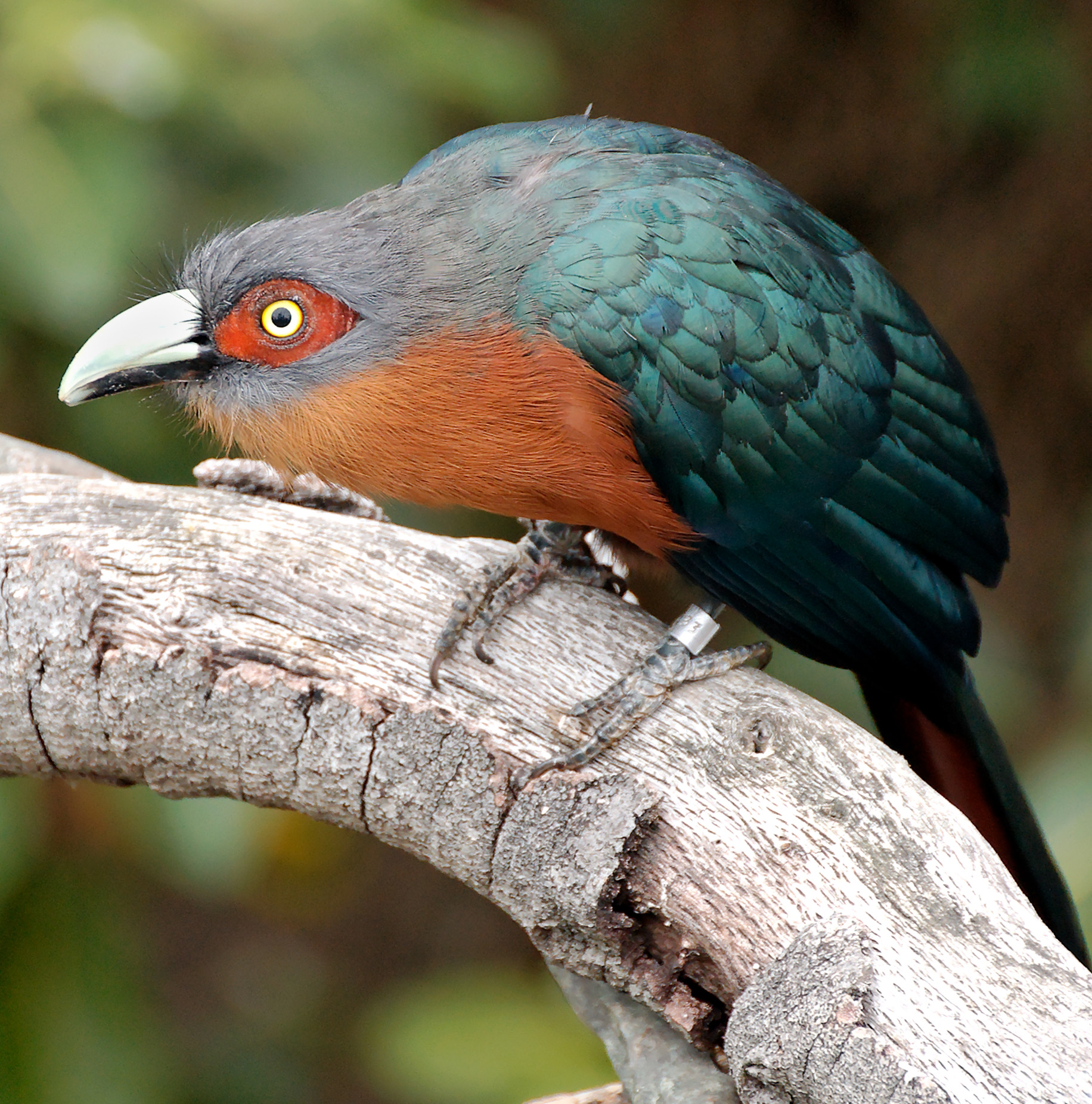
- Chestnut-breasted malkoha (Phaenicophaeus curvirostris)

Scientific classification
- Kingdom: Animalia
- Phylum: Chordata
- Class: Aves
- Clade: Columbaves
- Clade: Otidimorphae; Wagler, 1830

Orders
- Cuculiformes; Musophagiformes; Otidiformes

Synonyms
- Cuculimorphae

= Otidimorphae =

Otidimorphans Temporal range: Eocene - Holocene, 34–0 Ma

Clade of birds

Otidimorphae is a clade of birds that contains the orders Cuculiformes (cuckoos, and roadrunners), Musophagiformes (turacos), and Otidiformes (bustards) identified in 2014 by genome analysis. George Sangster and colleagues in 2022 named the clade uniting turacos and bustards as Musophagotides, defining it in the PhyloCode as "the least inclusive crown clade containing Otis tarda and Musophaga violacea, but not Grus grus or Mesitornis variegatus".

- Otidimorphae
  - Cuculiformes (cuckoos)
  - Musophagotides
    - Musophagiformes (turacos)
    - Otidiformes (bustards)

While the bustards seem to be related to the turacos, other genetic studies have found the cuckoos to be closer to the bustards than the turacos are.

- Otidimorphae
  - Musophagiformes (turacos)
  - - Otidiformes (bustards)
    - Cuculiformes (cuckoos)
