= List of birds =

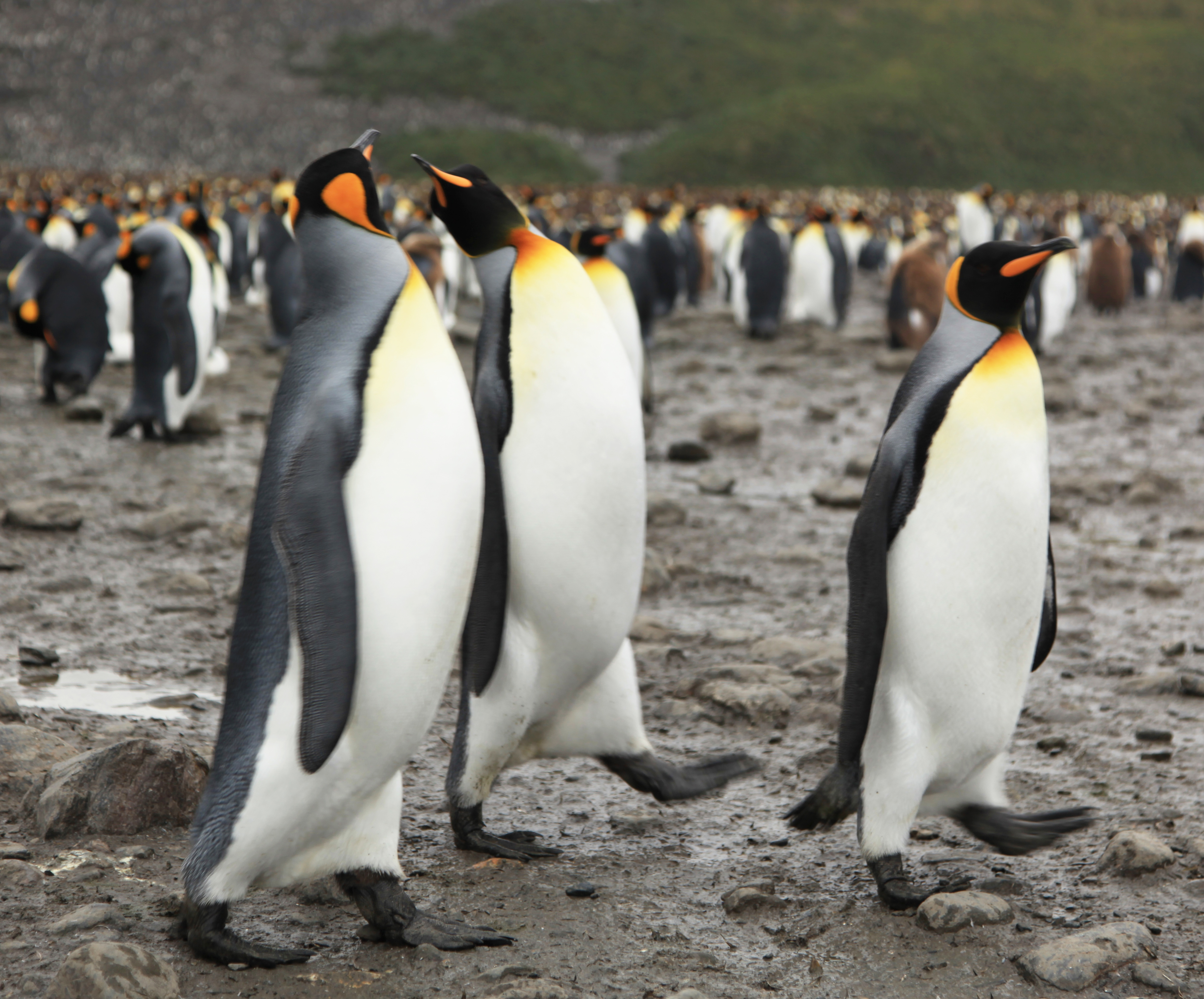
King penguins (Aptenodytes patagonicus)

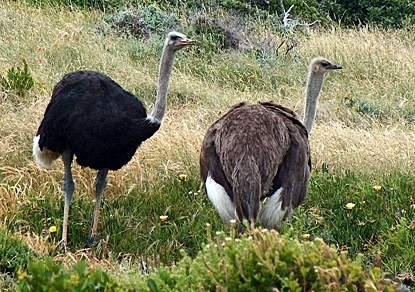
South African ostrich (Struthio camelus ssp. australis)

This article lists living orders and families of birds. In total there are about 11,000 species of birds described as of 2024, though one estimate of the real number places it at almost 20,000. The order passerines (perching birds) alone accounts for well over 5,000 species.

Taxonomy is very fluid in the age of DNA analysis, so comments are made where appropriate, and all numbers are approximate. In particular see Sibley-Ahlquist taxonomy for a very different classification.

== Phylogeny ==
Cladogram of modern bird relationships based on Stiller et al (2024)., showing the 44 orders recognised by the IOC.

- Aves
  - Palaeognathae
    - Struthioniformes (ostriches)
    - Notopalaeognathae
      - - Tinamiformes (tinamous)
        - Rheiformes (rheas)
      - Novaeratitae
        - Apterygiformes (kiwi)
        - Casuariiformes (emu and cassowaries)
  - Neognathae
    - Galloanserae
      - Galliformes (chickens, pheasants, and relatives)
      - Anseriformes (ducks, geese, and relatives)
    - Neoaves
      - - Mirandornithes
          - Phoenicopteriformes (flamingos)
          - Podicipediformes (grebes)
      - - Columbaves
          - Columbimorphae
            - Columbiformes (pigeons and doves)
            - Pteroclimesites
              - Mesitornithiformes (mesites)
              - Pterocliformes (sandgrouse)
          - Otidimorphae
            - Musophagiformes (turacos)
            - - Otidiformes (bustards)
              - Cuculiformes (cuckoos)
        - - Elementaves
            - - Gruae
                - Opisthocomiformes (hoatzin)
                - Gruimorphae
                  - Gruiformes (rails and cranes)
                  - Charadriiformes (waders, gulls, and relatives)
            - - Strisores
                - Caprimulgiformes (nightjars)
                - Vanescaves
                  - Sedentaves
                    - Nyctibiiformes (potoos)
                    - Steatornithiformes (oilbirds)
                  - Letornithes
                    - Podargiformes (frogmouths)
                    - Apodimorphae
                      - Aegotheliformes (owlet-nightjars)
                      - Apodiformes (swifts, treeswifts and hummingbirds)
              - Phaethoquornithes
                - Eurypygimorphae
                  - Phaethontiformes (tropicbirds)
                  - Eurypygiformes (sunbittern and kagu)
                - Aequornithes
                  - Gaviiformes (loons/divers)
                  - Feraequornithes
                    - Austrodyptornithes
                      - Procellariiformes (albatrosses, shearwaters, and petrels)
                      - Sphenisciformes (penguins)
                    - Pelecanimorphae
                      - Ciconiiformes (storks)
                      - Pelecanes
                        - Suliformes (frigatebirds, gannets, cormorants, and darters)
                        - Pelecaniformes (pelicans, herons and ibises)
          - Telluraves
            - Afroaves
              - Hieraves
                - Strigiformes (owls)
                - Accipitriformes (hawks, eagles, vultures, and relatives)
              - Coraciimorphae
                - Coliiformes (mousebirds)
                - Cavitaves
                  - Leptosomiformes (cuckoo roller)
                  - Eucavitaves
                    - Trogoniformes (trogons)
                    - Picocoraciae
                      - Bucerotiformes (hornbills, hoopoes and relatives)
                      - Picodynastornithes
                        - Coraciiformes (kingfishers, rollers, bee-eaters and relatives)
                        - Piciformes (woodpeckers and relatives)
            - Australaves
              - Cariamiformes (seriemas)
              - Eufalconimorphae
                - Falconiformes (falcons and caracaras)
                - Psittacopasseres
                  - Psittaciformes (parrots)
                  - Passeriformes (passerines)

== Subclass Palaeognathae ==
The Palaeognathae or "old jaws" is one of the two superorders recognized within the taxonomic class Aves and consist of the ratites and tinamous. The ratites are mostly large and long-legged, flightless birds, lacking a keeled sternum. Traditionally, all the ratites were place in the order Struthioniformes. However, recent genetic analysis has found that the group is not monophyletic, as it is paraphyletic with respect to the tinamous, so the ostriches are classified as the only members of the order Struthioniformes and other ratites placed in other orders.

=== Order Struthioniformes ===
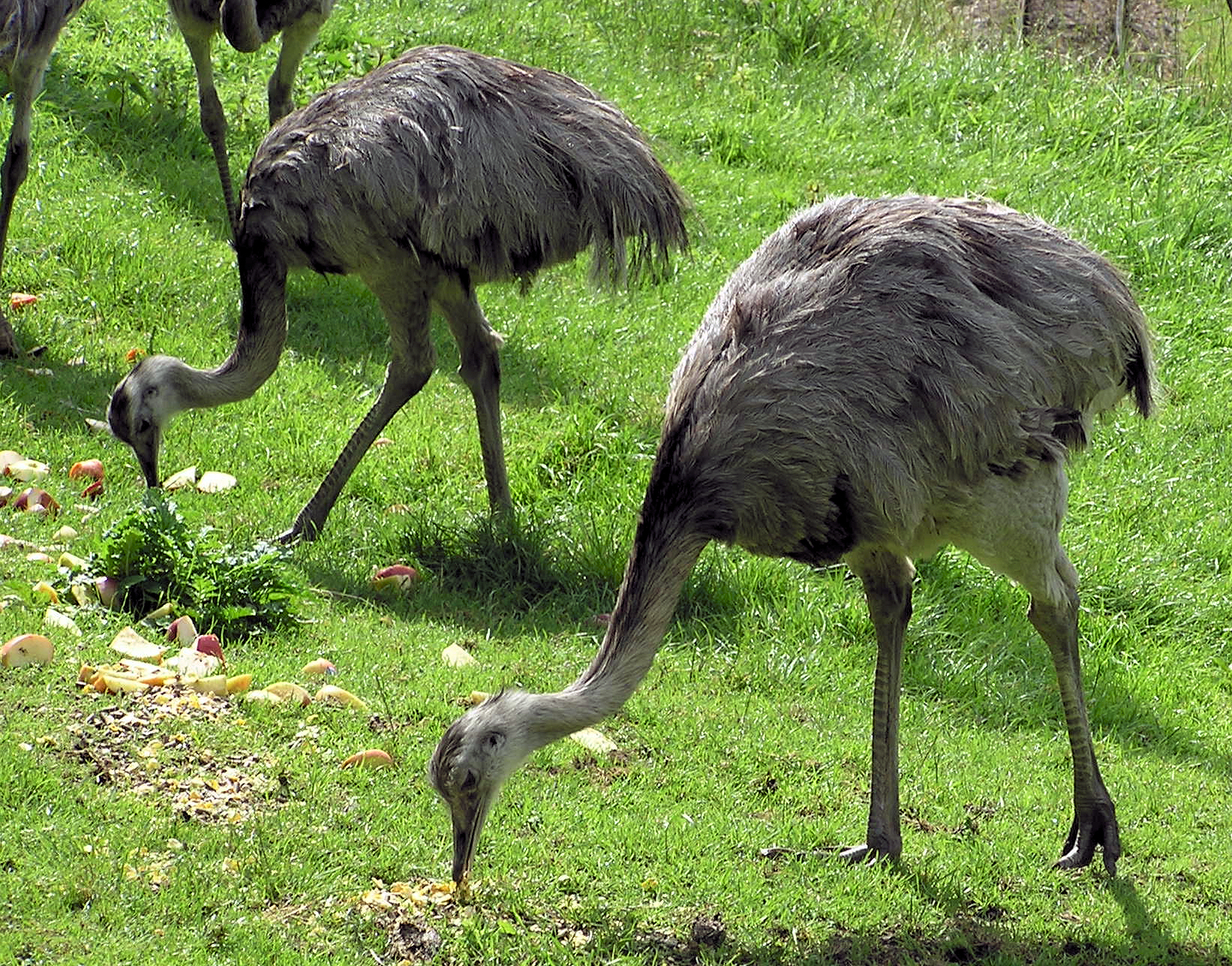
Greater rhea (Rhea americana)

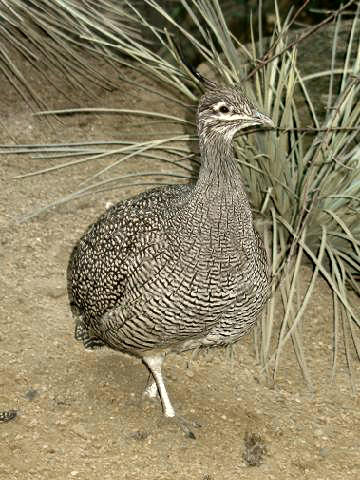
Elegant crested tinamou (Eudromia elegans)

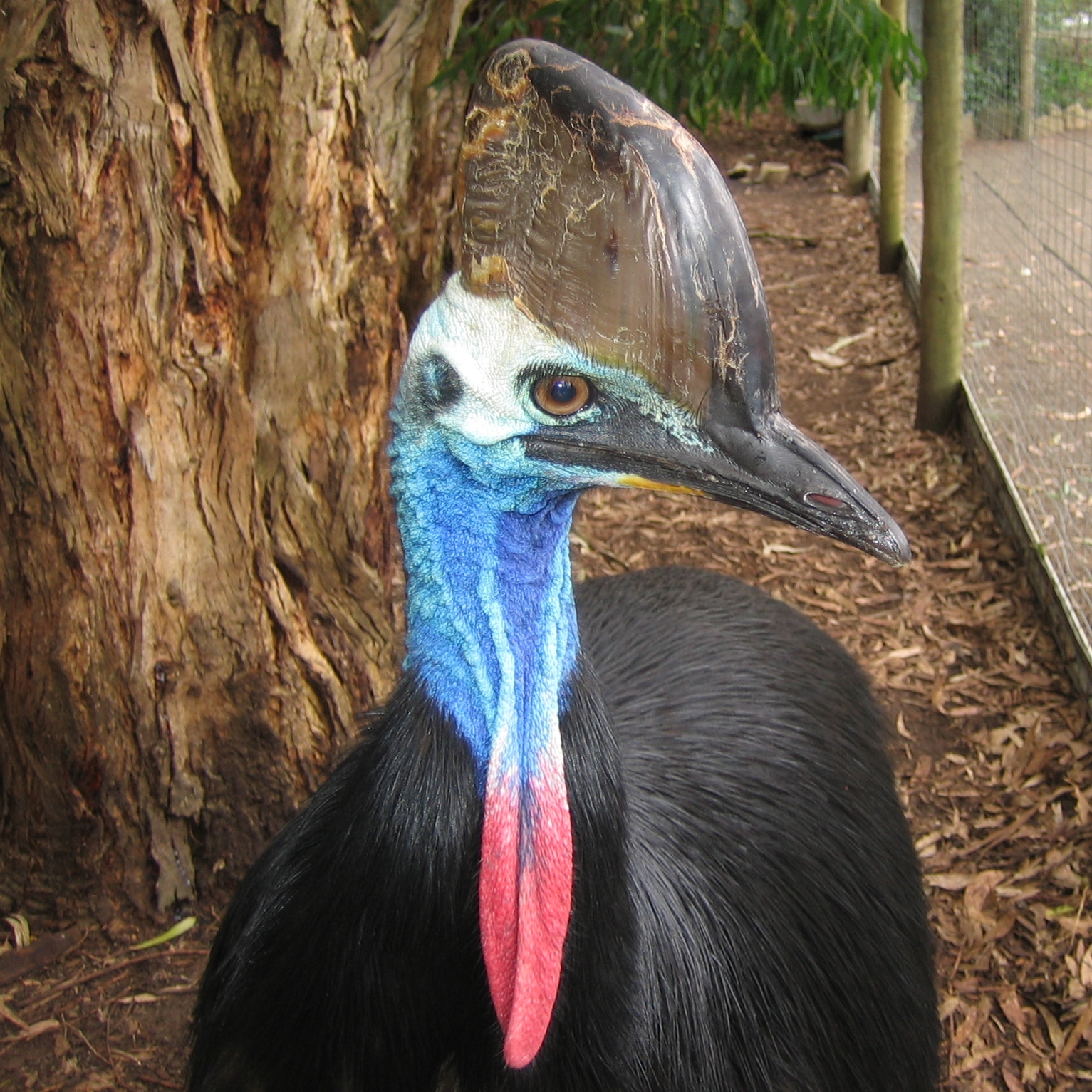
Southern cassowary (Casuarius casuarius)

Africa; 2 species

- Family Struthionidae: ostrich

=== Infraclass Notopalaeognathae ===
==== Order Rheiformes ====
South America; 2 species

- Family †Opisthodactylidae
- Family Rheidae: rheas

==== Order Casuariiformes ====
Australasia; 4 species

- Family Casuariidae: cassowaries and emu

==== Order Apterygiformes ====
Australasia; 5 species

- Family Apterygidae: kiwis

==== Order †Aepyornithiformes ====
Madagascar

- Family Aepyornithidae: elephant birds

==== Order †Dinornithiformes ====
New Zealand

- Family Megalapteryidae: upland moas
- Family Dinornithidae: great moas
- Family Emeidae: lesser moas

==== Order Tinamiformes ====
South America; 45 species

- Family Tinamidae: tinamous

== Subclass Neognathae ==
Nearly all living birds belong to the subclass Neognathae or "new jaws". With their keeled sternum (breastbone), unlike the ratites, they are known as carinatae.

=== Infraclass Galloanserae ===
==== Order Galliformes ====
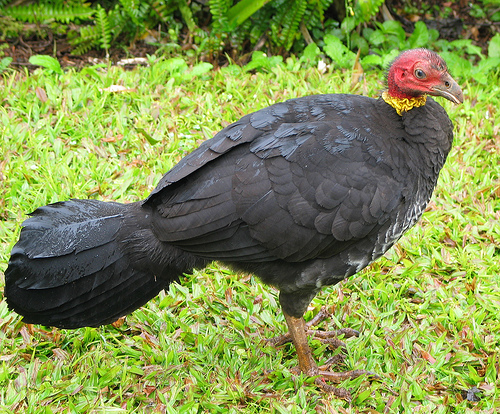
Australian brushturkey (Alectura lathami)

Worldwide; 250 species

- Family †Sylviornithidae
- Suborder Megapodii
  - Family Megapodidae: megapodes
- Suborder Craci
  - Family Cracidae: chachalacas, curassows, and guans
- Suborder Phasiani
  - Superfamily Numidioidea
    - Family Numididae: guineafowl
  - Superfamily Phasianoidea: pheasants and allies
    - Family Odontophoridae: New World quail
    - Family Phasianidae: pheasants and relatives

==== Order †Gastornithiformes ====
- Family Gastornithidae (see Gastornis)
- Family Dromornithidae: mihirungs

==== Order Anseriformes ====
Worldwide; 150 species

- Family Anhimidae: screamers
- Family Anseranatidae: magpie-goose
- Family Anatidae: ducks, geese, and swans

=== Infraclass Neoaves ===
==== Superorder Mirandornithes ====
===== Order Podicipediformes =====
Worldwide; 19 species

- Family Podicipedidae: grebes

===== Order Phoenicopteriformes =====
Worldwide; 6 species

- Family †Palaelodidae: swimming flamingos
- Family Phoenicopteridae: flamingos

==== Superorder Columbimorphae ====
===== Order Columbiformes =====
Worldwide; 300 species

- Family Columbidae: pigeons and doves

===== Order Pterocliformes =====
Africa, Europe, Asia; 16 species

- Family Pteroclidae: sandgrouse

===== Order Mesitornithiformes =====
Madagascar; 3 species

- Family Mesitornithidae: mesites

==== Grandorder Strisores ====
===== Order Caprimulgiformes =====
Worldwide; 97 species

- Family Caprimulgidae: nightjars

===== Order Steatornithiformes =====
South America; 1 species

- Family Steatornithidae: oilbird

===== Order Nyctibiiformes =====
Americas; 7 species

- Family Nyctibiidae: potoos

===== Order Podargiformes =====
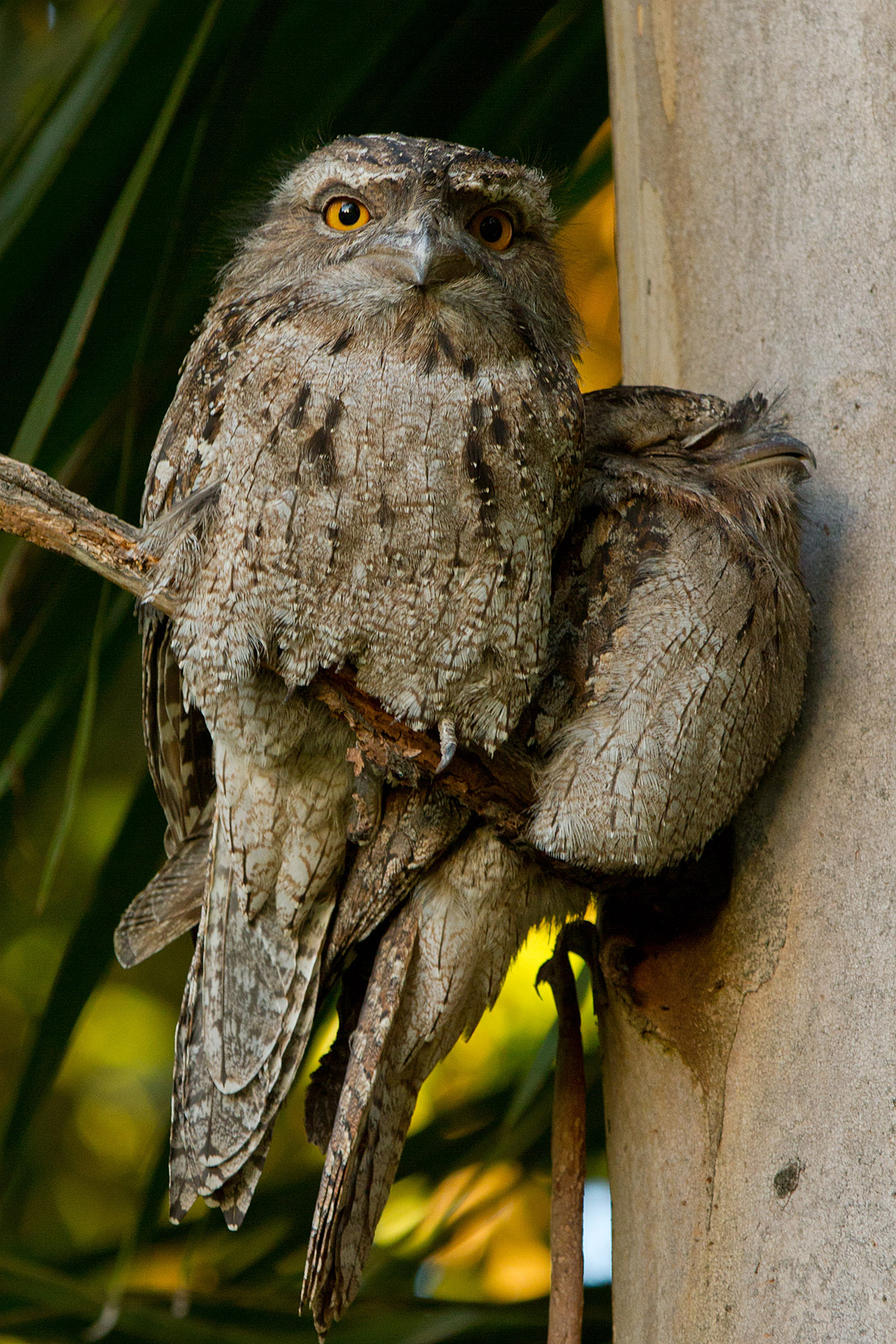
Tawny frogmouth (Podargus strigoides)

Asia and Australasia; 14 species

- Family Podargidae: frogmouths

===== Order Aegotheliformes =====
Australasia; 10 species

- Family Aegothelidae: owlet-nightjars

===== Order Apodiformes =====
Worldwide; 478 species

- Family Hemiprocnidae: treeswifts
- Family Apodidae: swifts
- Family Trochilidae: hummingbirds

==== Grandorder Otidimorphae ====
===== Order Cuculiformes =====
Worldwide; 150 species

- Family Cuculidae: cuckoos and relatives

===== Order Musophagiformes =====
Africa; 23 species

- Family Musophagidae: turacos and relatives

===== Order Otidiformes =====
Africa and Eurasia; 27 species

- Family Otididae: bustards

==== Superorder Gruae ====
===== Order Opisthocomiformes =====
South America; 1 species

- Family Opisthocomidae: hoatzin

===== Order Gruiformes =====
Worldwide; 164 species

- Suborder Grui: cranes and allies
  - Family Gruidae: cranes
  - Family Aramidae: limpkin
  - Family Psophiidae: trumpeters
- Suborder Ralli: rails and allies
  - Family †Aptornithidae: adzebills
  - Family Heliornithidae: finfoots
  - Family Sarothruridae: flufftails
  - Family Rallidae: rails and relatives

===== Order Charadriiformes =====
Worldwide; 350 species

====== Suborder Charadrii ======
Waders and typical shorebirds

- Infraorder Chionida: thick-knees and allies
  - Family Burhinidae: thick-knees and relatives
  - Family Chionididae: sheathbills
  - Family Pluvianellidae: Magellanic plover
- Infraorder Charadriida: plovers and plover-like waders
  - Family Charadriidae: true plovers, dotterels, and lapwings
  - Family Pluvialidae: golden plovers (sometimes classified as part of Charadriidae)
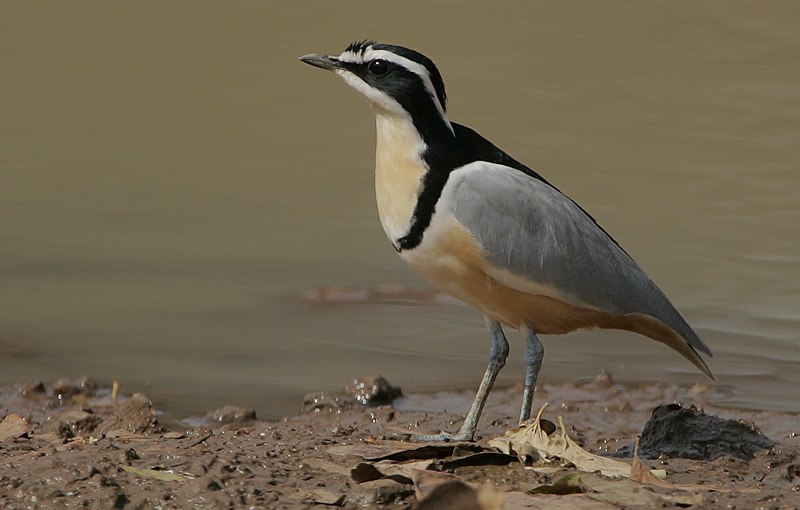
  - Egyptian plover (Pluvianus aegyptius)
    Family Pluvianidae: Egyptian plover
  - Family Ibidorhynchidae: ibisbill
  - Family Haematopodidae: oystercatchers
  - Family Recurvirostridae: avocets and stilts

====== Suborder Scolopaci ======
Small gregarious waders, including sandpipers, woodcocks, curlews, snipes, and jacanas

- Infraorder Jacanida: jacana-like waders
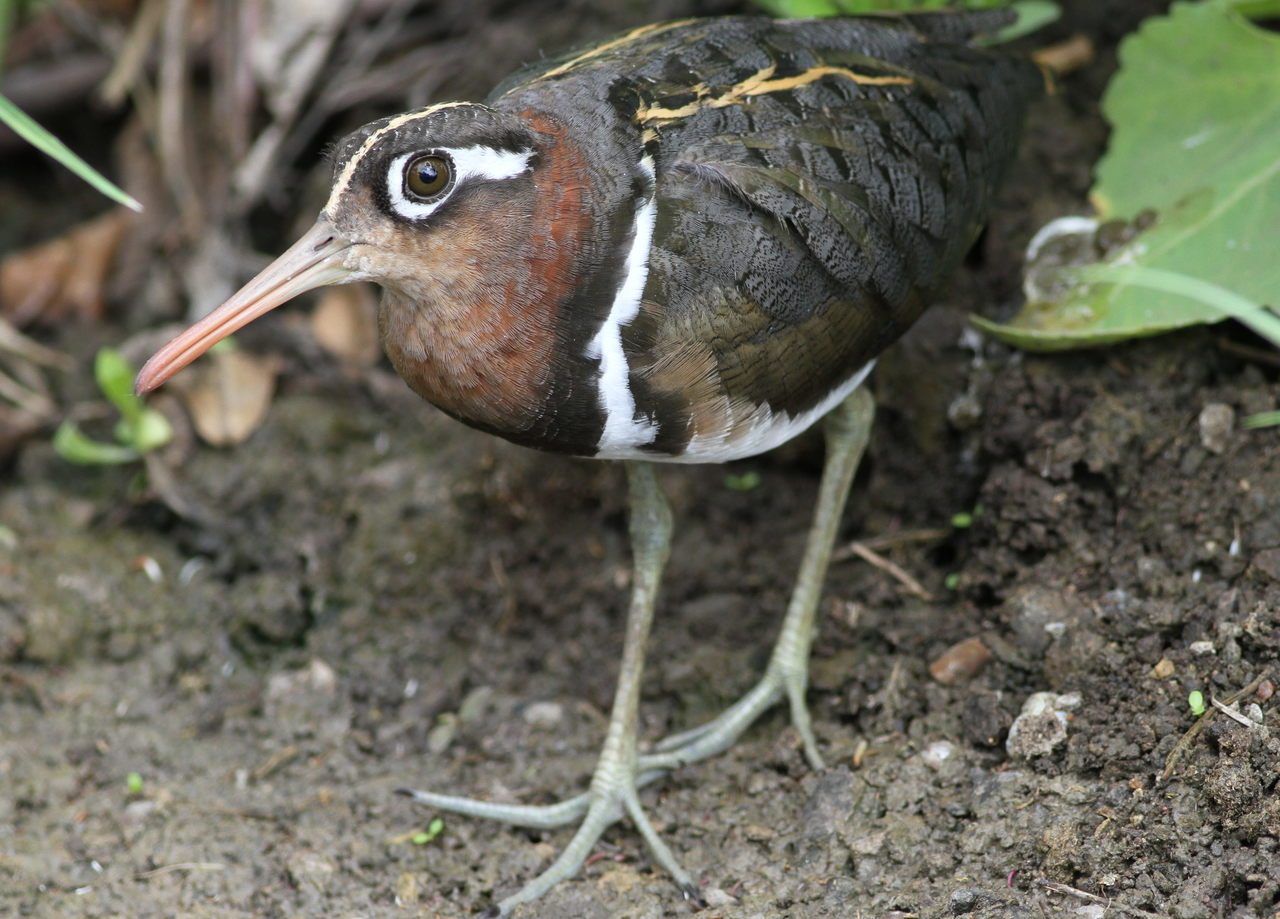
  - Greater painted-snipe (Rostratula benghalensis)
    Family Rostratulidae: painted snipes
  - Family Jacanidae: jacanas
  - Family Thinocoridae: seedsnipes
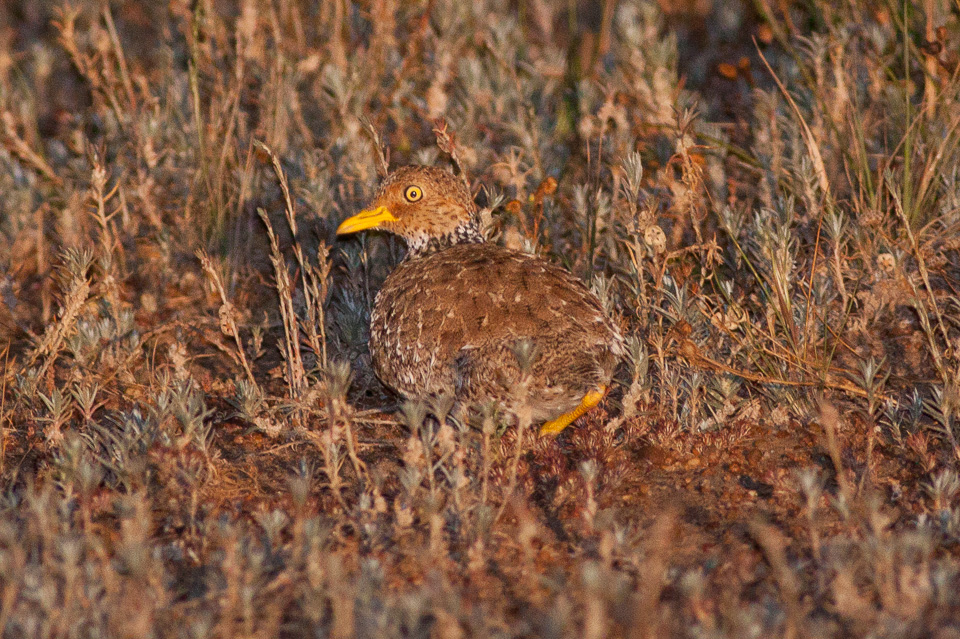
  - Plains-wanderer (Pedionomus torquatus)
    Family Pedionomidae: plains-wanderer
- Infraorder Scolopacida
  - Family Scolopacidae: sandpipers and relatives

====== Suborder Lari ======
Gulls and allies

- Infraorder Turnicida
  - Family Turnicidae: buttonquail
- Infraorder Larida: gulls and allies
  - Family Glareolidae: coursers and pratincoles
  - Family Dromadidae: crab-plover
  - Family Stercorariidae: skuas and jaegers
  - Family Alcidae: auks and puffins
  - Family Laridae: gulls, skimmers and terns

==== Grandorder Eurypygimorphae ====
===== Order Eurypygiformes =====
Neotropics and New Caledonia; 2 species

- Family Rhynochetidae: kagu
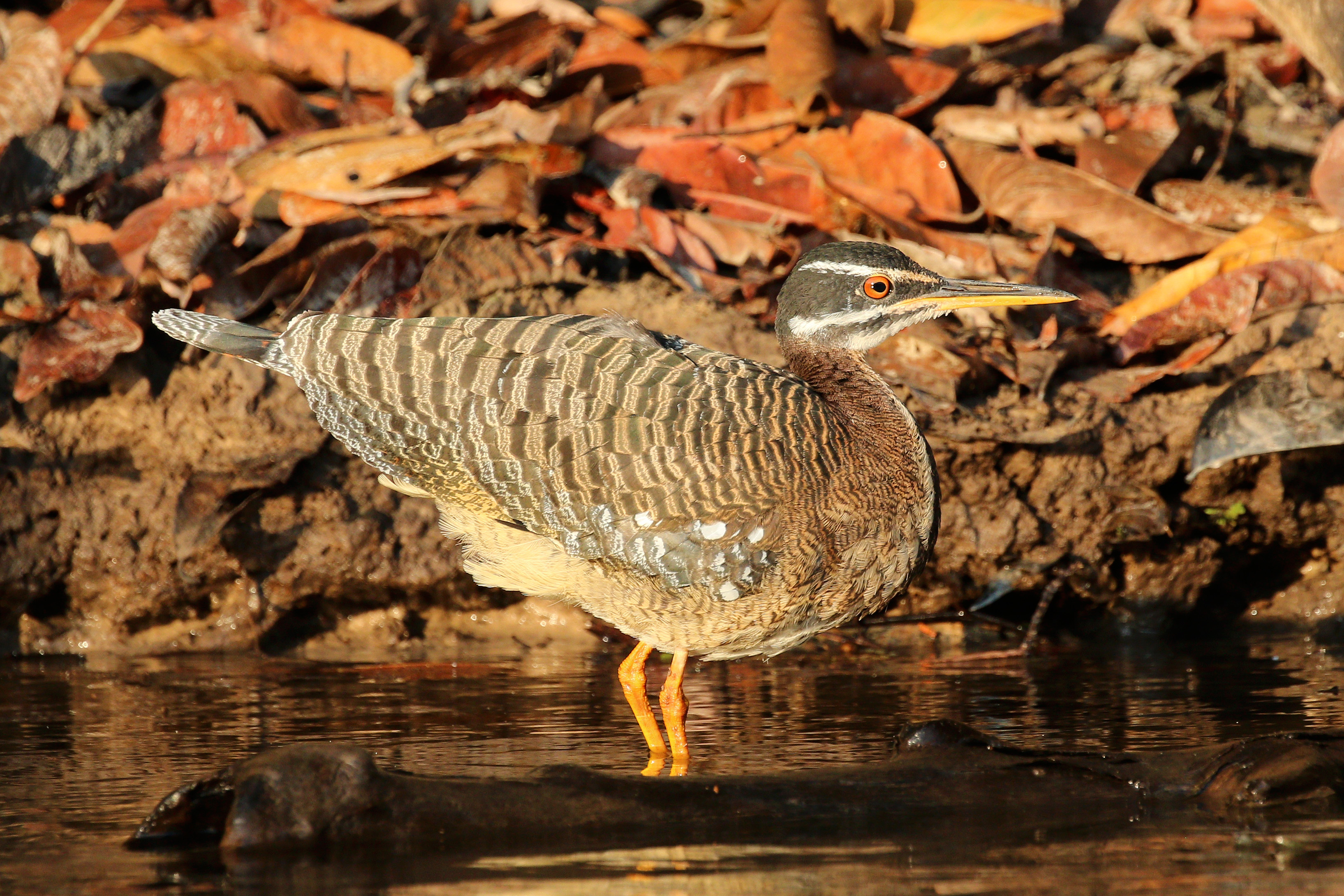
- Sunbittern (Eurypyga helias)
  Family Eurypygidae: sunbittern

===== Order Phaethontiformes =====
Oceanic; 3 species

- Family Phaethontidae: tropicbirds

==== Grandorder Aequornithes ====
===== Order Gaviiformes =====
North America, Eurasia; 5 species

- Family Gaviidae: loons

===== Order Sphenisciformes =====
Antarctic and southern waters; 17 species

- Family Spheniscidae: penguins

===== Order Procellariiformes =====
Pan-oceanic; 120 species

- Family Diomedeidae: albatrosses
- Family Oceanitidae: austral storm petrels
- Family Hydrobatidae: northern storm petrels
- Family Procellariidae: petrels and relatives

===== Order Ciconiiformes =====
Worldwide; 19 species

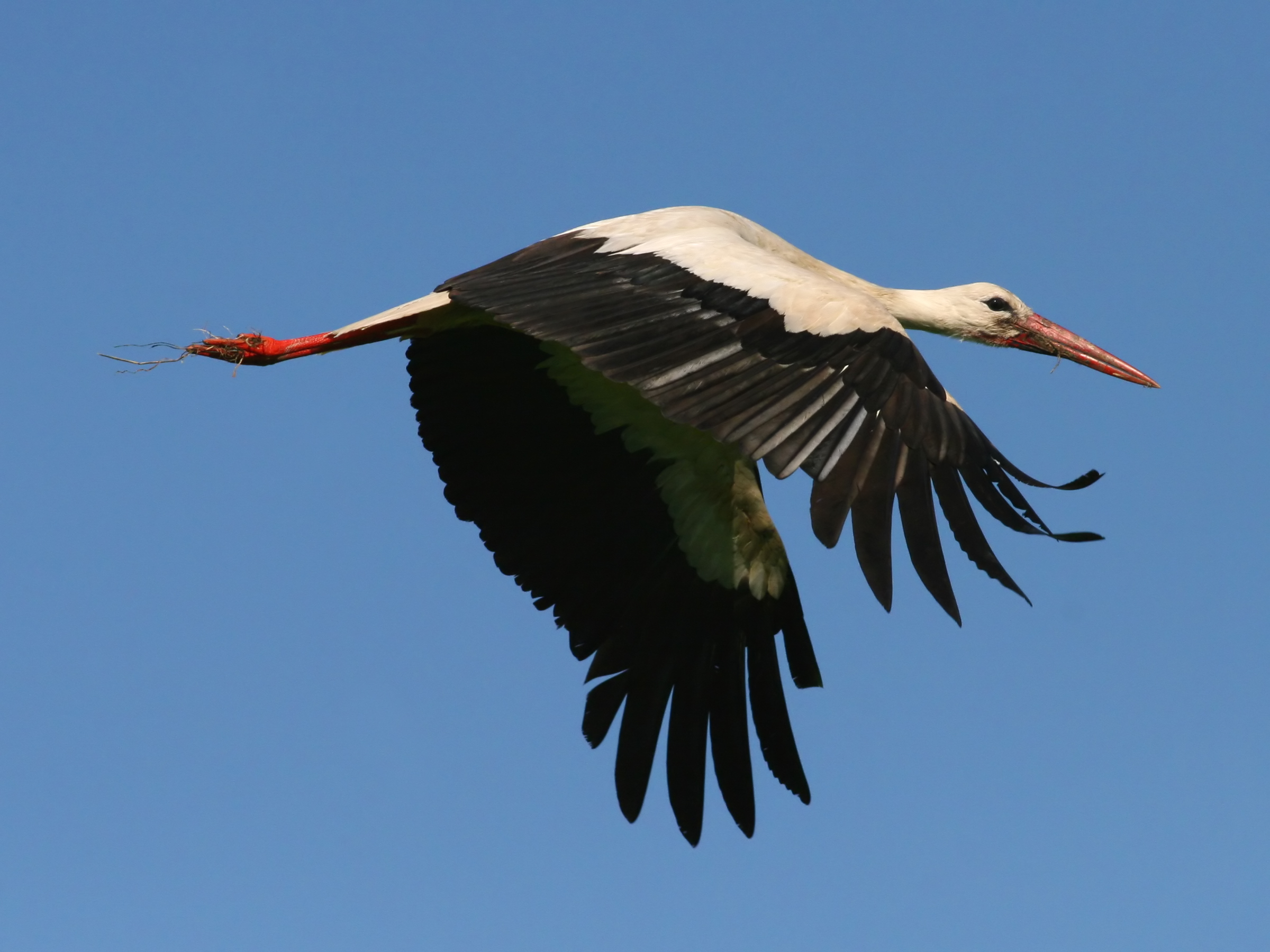
White stork (Ciconia ciconia)

- Family Ciconiidae: storks

===== Order Suliformes =====
Worldwide; 59 species

- Suborder Fregatae
  - Family Fregatidae: frigatebirds
- Suborder Sulae
  - Family Sulidae: boobies and gannets
  - Family Anhingidae: darters
  - Family Phalacrocoracidae: cormorants and shags

===== Order Pelecaniformes =====
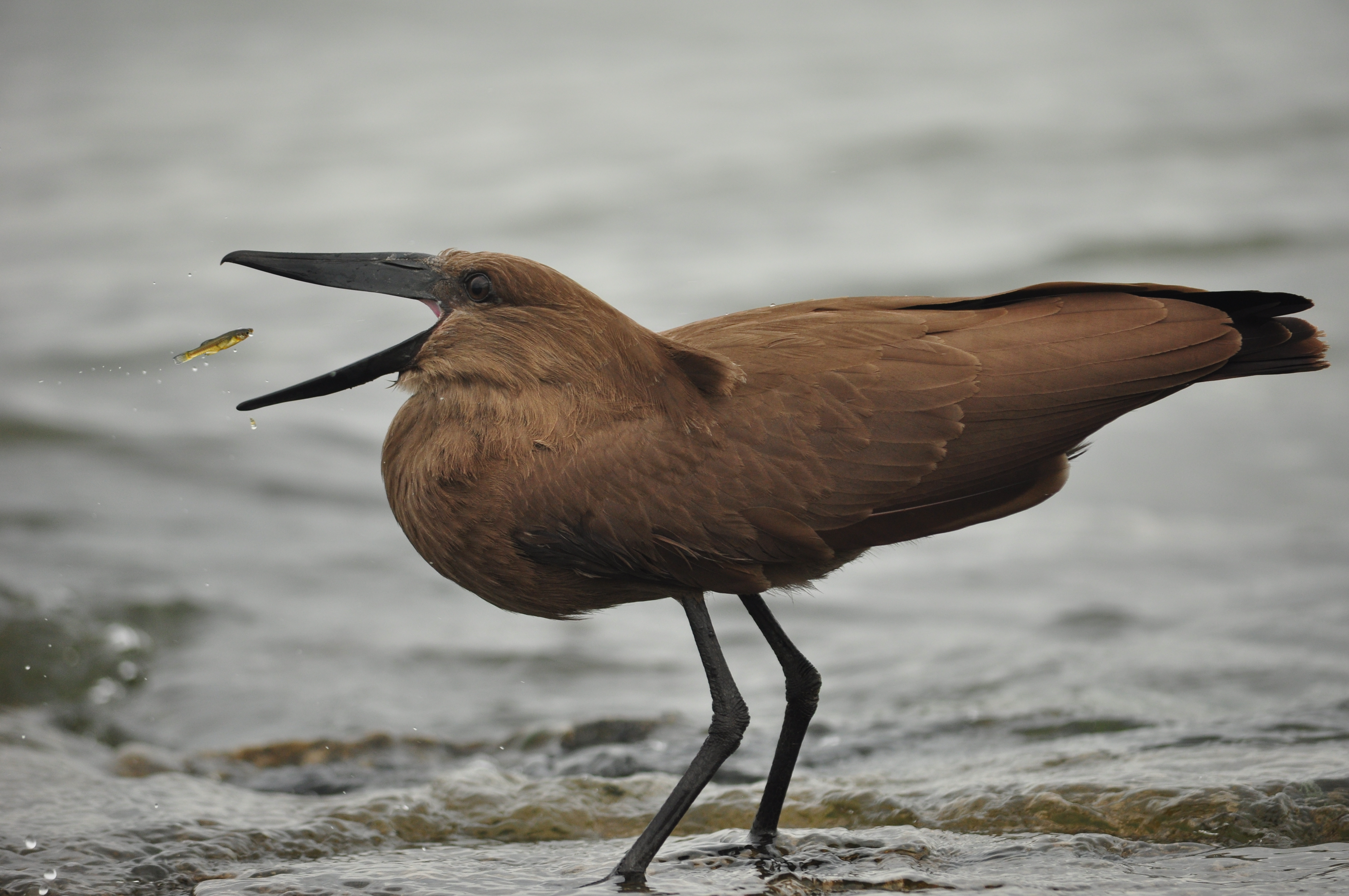
Hamerkop (Scopus umbretta)

Worldwide; 108 species

- Suborder Threskiornithes
  - Family Threskiornithidae: ibises and spoonbills
- Suborder Pelecani
  - Family Scopidae: hamerkop
  - Family Balaenicipitidae: shoebill
  - Family Pelecanidae: pelicans
- Suborder Ardeae
  - Family Ardeidae: herons and relatives

==== Grandorder Afroaves ====
===== Order Accipitriformes =====
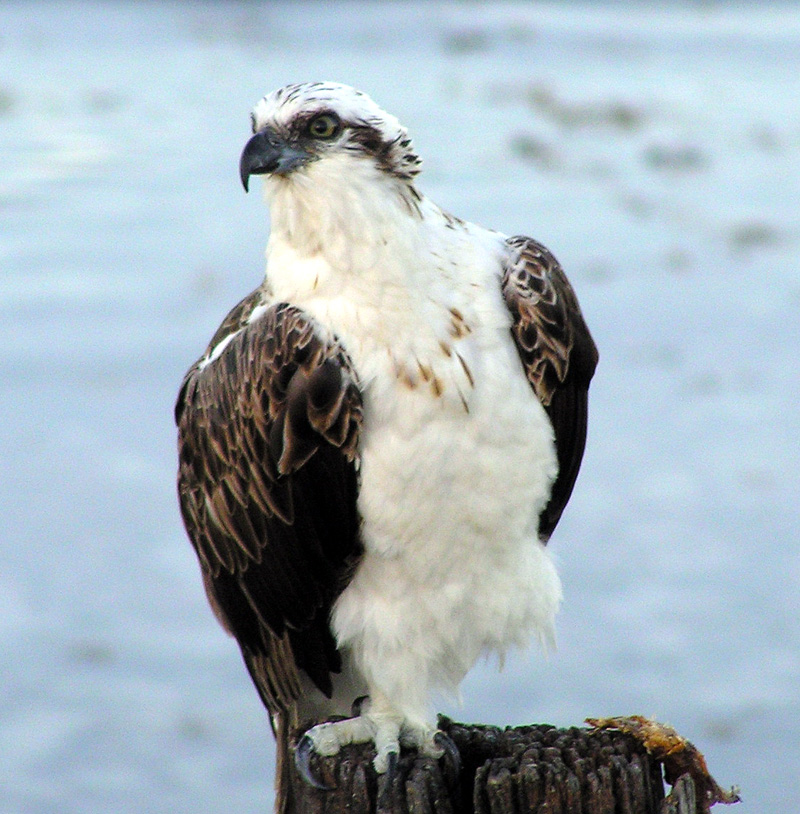
Osprey (Pandion haliaetus)

Worldwide; 260 species

- Suborder Cathartae
  - Family Cathartidae: New World vultures
- Suborder Accipitres
  - Family Sagittariidae: secretarybird
  - Family Pandionidae: osprey
  - Family Accipitridae: hawks, eagles, buzzards, harriers, kites and Old World vultures

===== Order Strigiformes =====
Worldwide; 250 species

- Family Tytonidae: barn owls
- Family Strigidae: true owls

===== Order Coliiformes =====
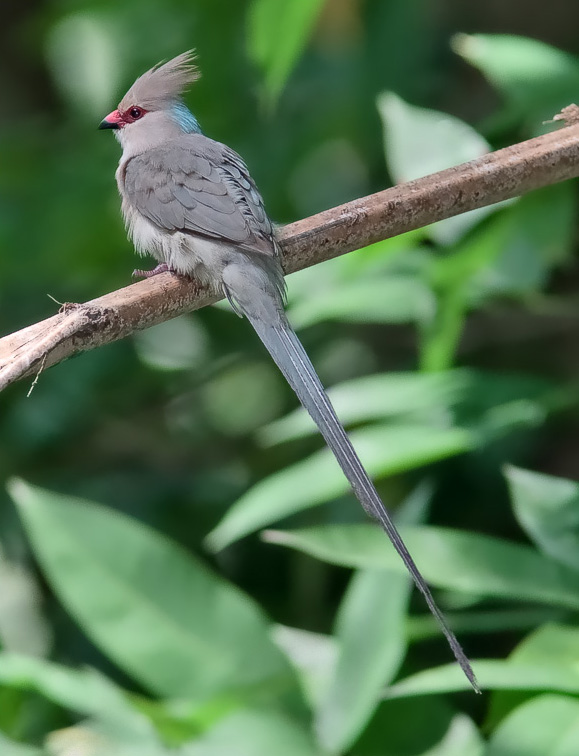
Blue-naped mousebird (Urocolius macrourus)

Sub-Saharan Africa; 6 species

- Family Coliidae: mousebirds

===== Order Leptosomiformes =====
Madagascar; 1 species

- Family Leptosomidae: cuckoo-roller

===== Order Trogoniformes =====
Sub-Saharan Africa, Americas, Asia; 35 species

- Family Trogonidae: trogons and quetzals

===== Order Bucerotiformes =====
Old World, New Guinea; 64 species

- Superfamily Buceroidea
  - Family Bucerotidae: hornbills
- Superfamily Upupoidea
  - Family Upupidae: hoopoe
  - Family Phoeniculidae: wood hoopoes

===== Order Coraciiformes =====
Worldwide; 144 species

- Suborder Meropi
  - Family Meropidae: bee-eaters
- Suborder Coracii
  - Family Coraciidae: rollers
  - Family Brachypteraciidae: ground rollers
- Suborder Alcedines
  - Family Todidae: todies
  - Family Momotidae: motmots
  - Family Alcedinidae: kingfishers

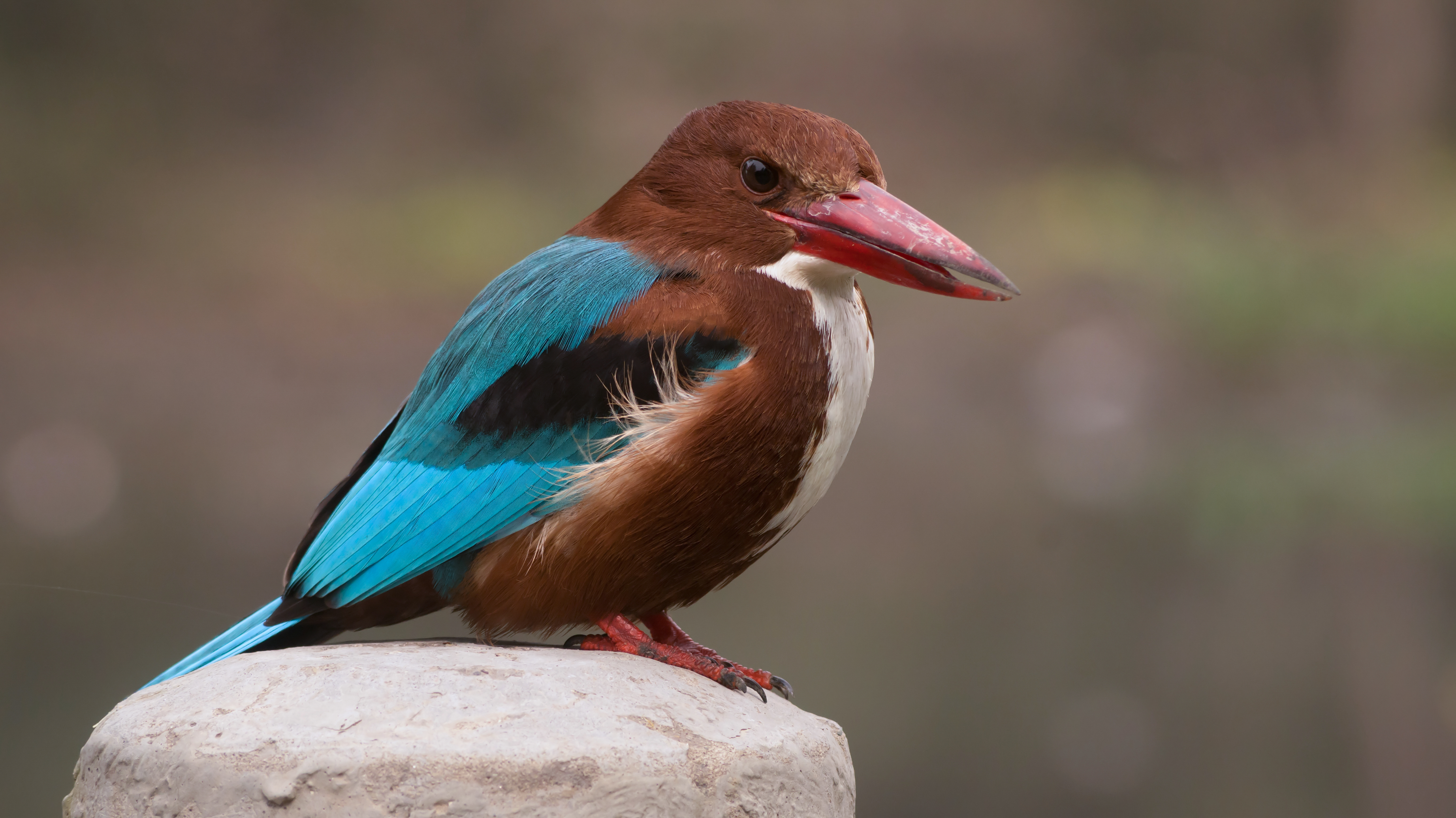
White-throated kingfisher (Halcyon smyrnensis)

===== Order Piciformes =====
Worldwide except Australasia; 400 species

- Suborder Galbuli
  - Family Galbulidae: jacamars
  - Family Bucconidae: puffbirds
- Suborder Pici
  - Family Lybiidae: African barbets
  - Family Megalaimidae: Asian barbets
  - Family Ramphastidae: toucans
  - Family Semnornithidae: toucan barbets
  - Family Capitonidae: American barbets
  - Family Indicatoridae: honeyguides
  - Family Picidae: woodpeckers

==== Grandorder Australaves ====
===== Order Cariamiformes =====
South America; 2 species

- Family Cariamidae: seriemas

===== Order Falconiformes =====
Worldwide; 60 species

- Family Falconidae: falcons and relatives

===== Order Psittaciformes =====
Pan-tropical, southern temperate zones; 330 species

- Superfamily Strigopoidea
  - Family Strigopidae: kākāpō
  - Family Nestoridae: kea and kakas
- Superfamily Cacatuoidea
  - Family Cacatuidae: cockatoos and cockatiel
- Superfamily Psittacoidea
  - Family Psittacidae: African and American parrots
  - Family Psittaculidae: Australasian parrots
  - Family Psittrichasiidae: Pesquet's parrot, vasa parrots

===== Order Passeriformes =====
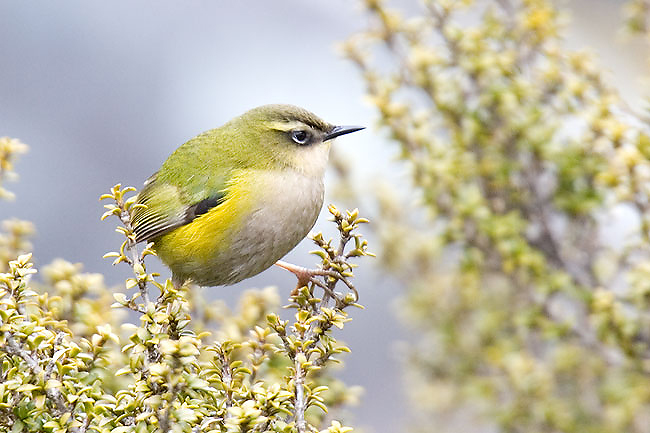
New Zealand rock wren (Xenicus gilviventris)

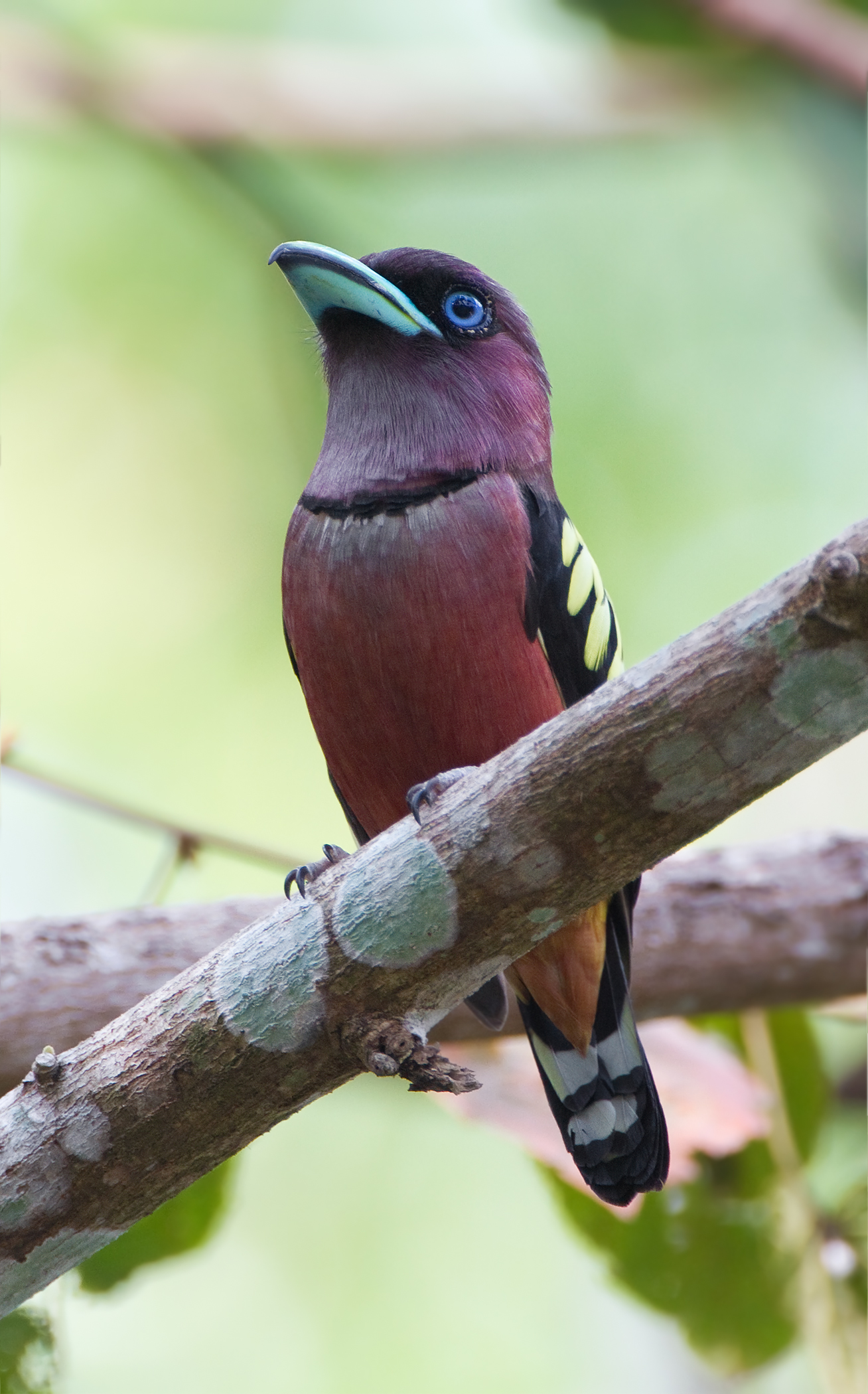
Banded broadbill (Eurylaimus javanicus)

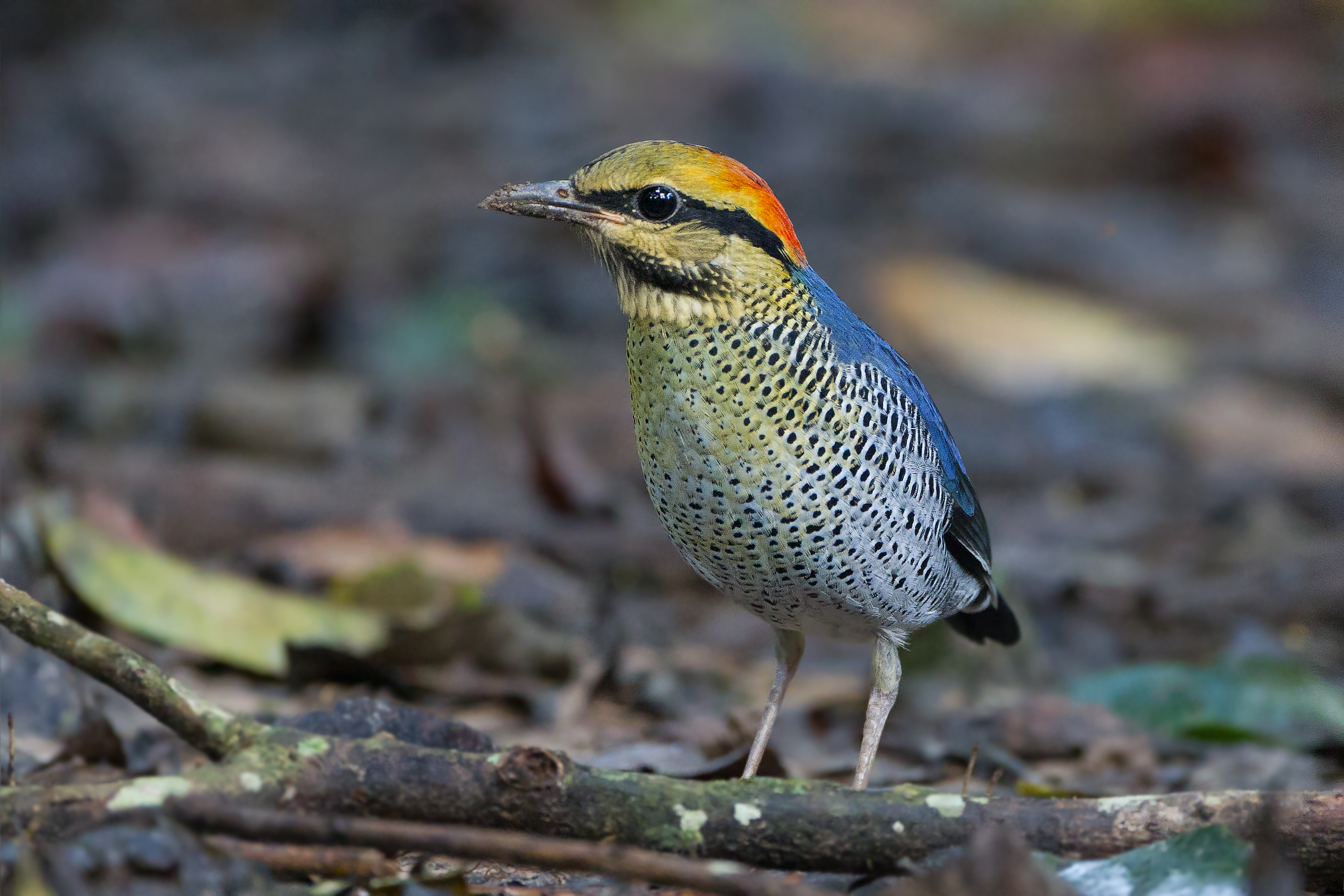
Blue pitta (Hydrornis cyaneus)

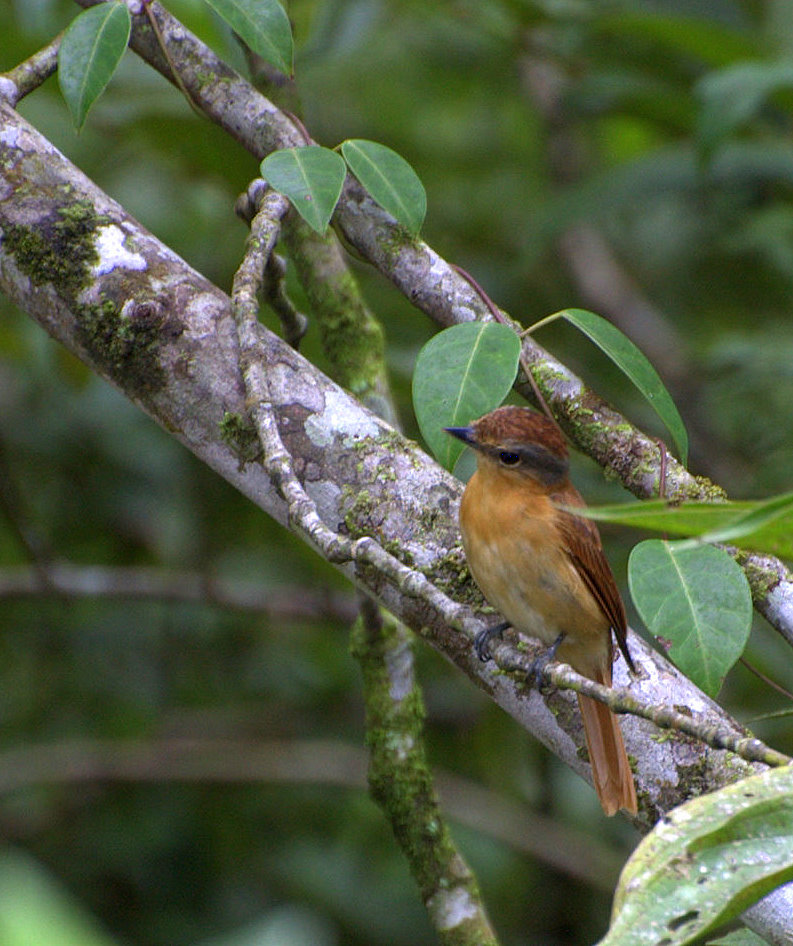
Chestnut-crowned becard (Pachyramphus castaneus)

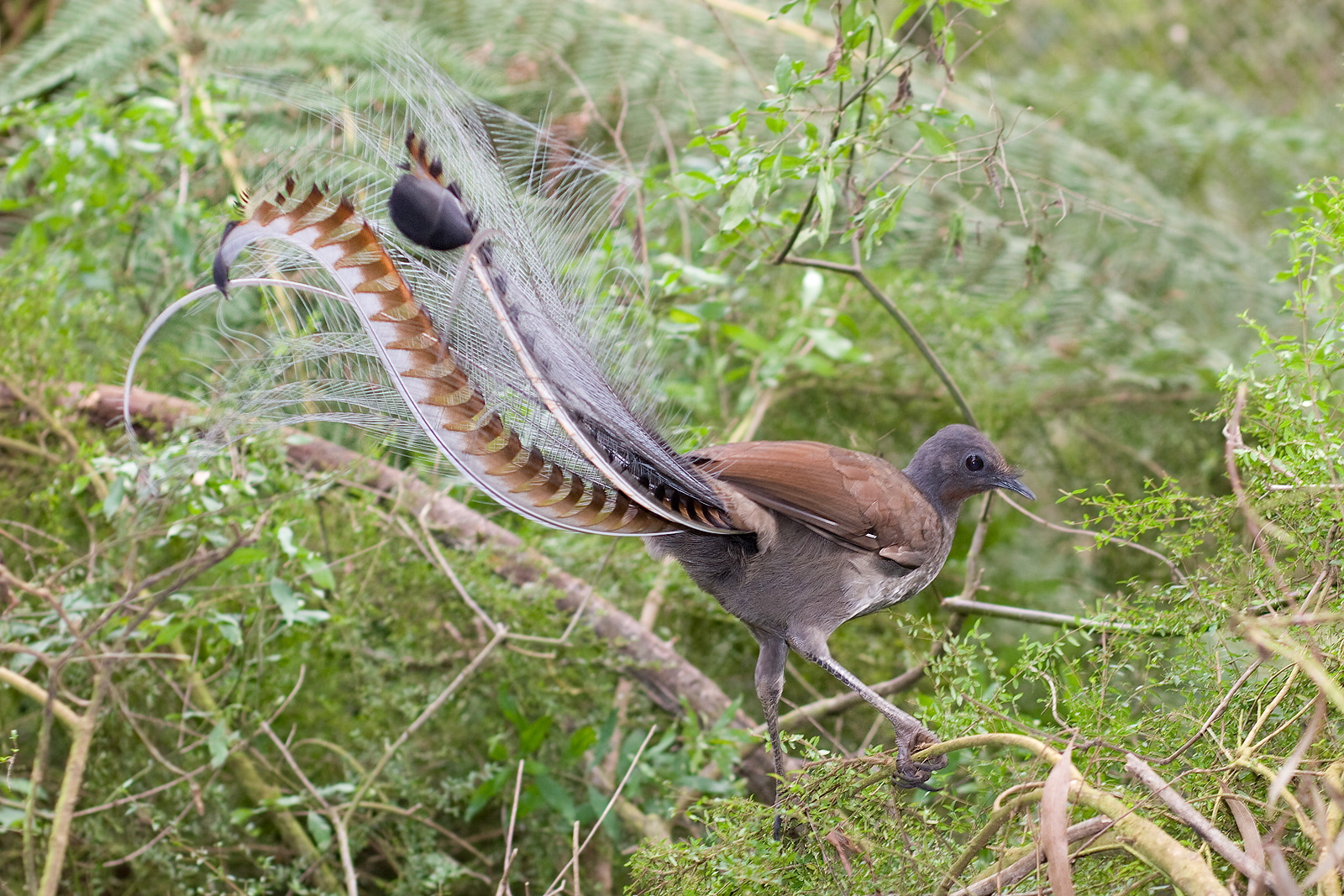
Superb lyrebird (Menura novaehollandiae)

Worldwide; 6,500 species

====== Suborder Acanthisitti: New Zealand wrens ======
- Family Acanthisittidae: New Zealand wrens

====== Suborder Tyranni: suboscines ======
- Infraorder Eurylaimides: Old World suboscines
  - Superfamily Sapayooidea
    - Family Sapayoidae: sapayoa
  - Superfamily Eurylaimoidea
    - Family Eurylaimidae: broadbills
    - Family Calyptomenidae: African and green broadbills
  - Superfamily Pittoidea
    - Family Pittidae: pittas
    - Family Philepittidae: asities
- Infraorder Tyrannides: New World suboscines
  - Parvorder Tyrannida: bronchophones
    - Family Pipridae: manakins
    - Family Cotingidae: cotingas
    - Family Oxyruncidae: sharpbills
    - Family Onychorhynchidae: royal flycatchers and allies
    - Family Tityridae: becards and tityras
    - Family Pipritidae: piprites
    - Family Platyrinchidae: spadebills
    - Family Tachurididae: many-colored rush tyrants
    - Family Rhynchocyclidae: mionectine flycatchers
    - Family Tyrannidae: tyrant flycatchers
  - Parvorder Furnariida: tracheophones
    - Family Melanopareiidae: crescent-chests
    - Family Conopophagidae: gnateaters
    - Family Thamnophilidae: antbirds
    - Family Grallariidae: antpittas
    - Family Rhinocryptidae tapaculos
    - Family Formicariidae: antthrushes
    - Family Furnariidae: ovenbirds

====== Suborder Passeri: oscines ======
- Infraorder Menurides
  - Family Atrichornithidae: scrub-birds
  - Family Menuridae: lyrebirds
- Infraorder Climacterides
  - Family Ptilonorhynchidae: bowerbirds
  - Family Climacteridae: Australasian treecreepers
- Infraorder Meliphagides
  - Family Maluridae: Australasian wrens
  - Family Dasyornithidae: bristlebirds
  - Family Pardalotidae: pardalotes
  - Family Acanthizidae: gerygones, thornbills and allies
  - Family Meliphagidae: honeyeaters and relatives
- Infraorder Orthonychides
  - Family Pomatostomidae: Australasian babblers
  - Family Orthonychidae: logrunners
- Infraorder Corvides
  - Superfamily Cinclosomatoidea
    - Family Cinclosomatidae: quail-thrushes and jewel-babblers
  - Superfamily Campephagoidea
    - Family Campephagidae: cuckoo-shrikes
  - Superfamily Mohouoidea
    - Family Mohouidae: whitehead and allies
  - Superfamily Neosittoidea
    - Family Neosittidae: sittellas
  - Superfamily Orioloidea
    - Family Eulacestomidae: wattled ploughbills
    - Family Psophodidae: whipbirds and quail-thrushes
    - Family Oreoicidae: Australo-Papuan bellbirds
    - Family Falcunculidae: crested shriketits
    - Family Paramythiidae: painted berrypeckers
    - Family Vireonidae: vireos, greenlets and shrike-babblers
    - Family Pachycephalidae: whistlers and relatives (Colluricinclidae)
    - Family Oriolidae: Old World orioles
  - Superfamily Malaconotoidea
    - Family Machaerirhynchidae: boatbills
    - Family Artamidae: woodswallows and butcherbirds
    - Family Rhagologidae: mottled berryhunter
    - Family Aegithinidae: ioras
    - Family Pityriaseidae: bristlehead
    - Family Malaconotidae: bushshrikes and relatives
    - Family Platysteiridae: wattle-eyes and batises
    - Family Vangidae: vangas (Tephrodornithidae; Prionopidae)
  - Superfamily Corvoidea
    - Family Rhipiduridae: fantails
    - Family Lamproliidae: silktail, drongo fantail
    - Family Dicruridae: drongos
    - Family Ifritidae: blue-capped ifrits
    - Family Melampittidae: melampittas
    - Family Corcoracidae: Australian mudnesters
    - Family Paradisaeidae: birds-of-paradise
    - Family Monarchidae: monarch flycatchers
    - Family Laniidae: shrikes
    - Family Corvidae: jays and crows
    - Family Platylophidae: crested jayshrikes
- Infraorder Passerides
  - Parvorder Melanocharitida
    - Family Melanocharitidae: berrypeckers
  - Parvorder Cnemophilida
    - Family Cnemophilidae: satinbirds
  - Parvorder Petroicida
    - Family Petroicidae: Australasian robins
    - Family Notiomystidae: stitchbird
    - Family Callaeidae: wattlebirds
  - Parvorder Eupetida
    - Family Picathartidae: rockfowl
    - Family Chaetopidae: rock-jumpers
    - Family Eupetidae: rail-babbler
  - Parvorder Sylviida
    - Superfamily Paroidea
      - Family Stenostiridae: fairy warblers
      - Family Hyliotidae: hyliotas
      - Family Remizidae: penduline tits
      - Family Paridae: chickadees and true tits
    - Superfamily Alaudoidea
      - Family Nicatoridae: nicators
      - Family Panuridae: bearded reedling
      - Family Alaudidae: larks
    - Family Macrosphenidae: African warblers
    - Superfamily Locustelloidea
      - Family Cisticolidae: cisticolas and relatives
      - Family Acrocephalidae: marsh warblers
      - Family Pnoepygidae: pygmy wren-babblers
      - Family Locustellidae: grass warblers
      - Family Donacobiidae: donacobius
      - Family Bernieridae: Malagasy warblers
    - Family Hirundinidae: swallows and martins
    - Family Pycnonotidae: bulbuls
    - Superfamily Aegithaloidea
      - Family Phylloscopidae: leaf warblers
      - Family Cettiidae: bush warblers (Erythrocercidae; Scotocercidae)
      - Family Hyliidae: hylias
      - Family Aegithalidae: bushtits
    - Superfamily Sylvioidea
      - Family Sylviidae: true warblers
      - Family Paradoxornithidae: parrotbills, fulvettas
      - Family Zosteropidae: white-eyes
      - Family Timaliidae: babblers and relatives
      - Family Pellorneidae: fulvettas, ground babblers
      - Family Leiothrichidae: laughing thrushes
  - Parvorder Muscicapida
    - Superorder Reguloidea
      - Family Regulidae: kinglets
    - Superfamily Bombycilloidea
      - Family Elachuridae: spotted wren-babblers
      - Family †Mohoidae: Hawaiian honeyeaters
      - Family Ptiliogonatidae: silky-flycatchers
      - Family Bombycillidae: waxwings
      - Family Dulidae: palmchat
      - Family Hypocoliidae: hypocolius
      - Family Hylocitreidae: hylocitrea
    - Superfamily Certhioidea
      - Family Tichodromidae: wallcreeper
      - Family Sittidae: nuthatches
      - Family Salpornithidae: spotted creepers
      - Family Certhiidae: treecreepers
      - Family Polioptilidae: gnatcatchers
      - Family Troglodytidae: wrens
    - Superfamily Muscicapoidea
      - Family Cinclidae: dippers
      - Family Turdidae: thrushes and relatives
      - Family Muscicapidae: flycatchers and relatives
      - Family Buphagidae: oxpeckers
      - Family Mimidae: mockingbirds and thrashers
      - Family Sturnidae: starlings and mynas (Rhabdornithidae)
  - Parvorder Passerida
    - Family Promeropidae: sugarbirds
    - Family Modulatricidae: dapplethroat and allies
    - Family Dicaeidae: flowerpeckers
    - Family Nectariniidae: sunbirds
    - Family Irenidae: fairy-bluebirds
    - Family Chloropseidae: leafbirds
    - Family Peucedramidae: olive warbler
    - Family Prunellidae: accentors
    - Family Urocynchramidae: pink-tailed bunting
    - Superfamily Ploceoidea
      - Family Ploceidae: weavers and relatives
      - Family Viduidae: whydahs and indigobirds
      - Family Estrildidae: estrildid finches
    - Family Passeridae: Old World sparrows
    - Family Motacillidae: wagtails and pipits
    - Family Fringillidae: finches and relatives
    - Superfamily Emberizoidea
      - Family Calcariidae: longspurs, snow buntings
      - Family Rhodinocichlidae: rosy thrush-tanagers
      - Family Emberizidae: Old World buntings
      - Family Passerellidae: New World sparrows
      - Family Calyptophilidae: chat-tanagers
      - Family Phaenicophilidae: palm-tanager and allies
      - Family Zeledoniidae: wrenthrush
      - Family Icteriidae: yellow-breasted chat
      - Family Icteridae: New World blackbirds and New World orioles
      - Family Teretistridae: Cuban warblers
      - Family Parulidae: wood warblers
      - Family Mitrospingidae: mitrospingid tanagers
      - Family Cardinalidae: cardinals, grosbeaks, and New World buntings
      - Family Thraupidae: tanagers and relatives (Coerebidae)

== See also ==
- Lists of animals
- List of bird genera
- List of chicken breeds
- List of birds by common name
- List of individual birds
- Lists by continent
  - List of birds of Africa
  - List of birds of Antarctica
  - List of birds of Asia
  - List of birds of Australia
  - List of birds of Europe
  - List of birds of North America
  - List of birds of South America
- Lists by smaller geographic unit
  - Lists of birds by region
- Extinct birds
  - List of recently extinct bird species
  - List of Late Quaternary prehistoric bird species
  - List of fossil bird genera
- List of fictional birds
