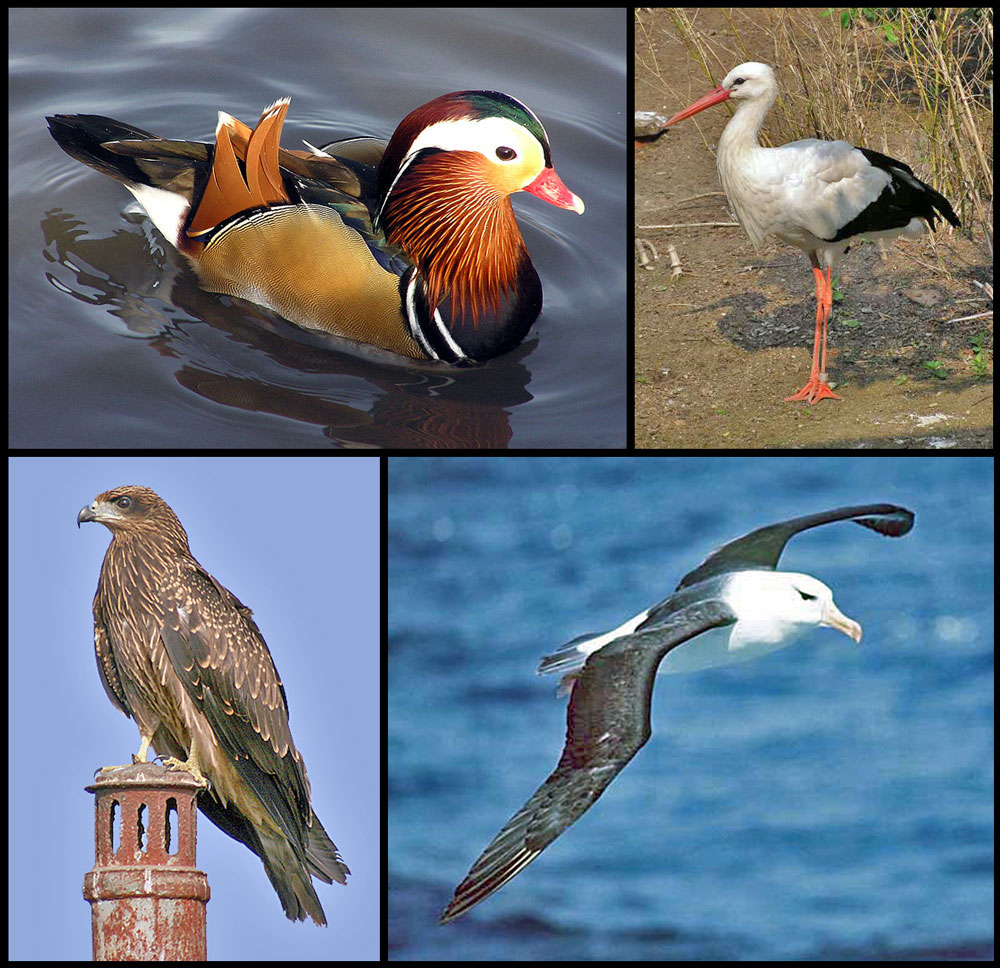

Scientific classification
- Kingdom: Animalia
- Phylum: Chordata
- Class: Aves
- Infraclass: Neognathae; Pycraft, 1900

Subgroups
- Pangalloanserae; Neoaves; †Odontopterygiformes; †Vegaviidae (possibly within Anseriformes)

= Neognathae =

Neognaths Temporal range: Late Cretaceous – present, 72–0 Ma Possible Early Cretaceous origin based on molecular clock

Infraclass of birds

Neognathae (/niˈɒɡnəθiː/; from Ancient Greek νέος (néos) 'new, young' and γνάθος (gnáthos) 'jaw') is an infraclass of birds, called neognaths, within the class Aves of the clade Archosauria. Neognathae includes the majority of living birds; the exceptions being the tinamous and the flightless ratites, which belong instead to the sister taxon Palaeognathae. There are nearly 10,000 living species of neognaths.

The earliest fossils are known from the very end of the Cretaceous period, specifically during the Maastrichtian stage. As of 2026, the neognath genera from the latest Cretaceous supported by phylogenetic analyses include Asteriornis, Vegavis, Polarornis and Pujatopouli, but molecular clocks suggest that neognaths originated sometime in the first half of the Late Cretaceous, about 90 million years ago. Since then, they have undergone adaptive radiation, producing the diversity of form, function, and behavior that exists today. Neognathae includes the order Passeriformes (perching birds), one of the largest orders of land vertebrates, containing some 60% of living birds. Passeriformes is twice as species-rich as Rodentia and about five times as species-rich as Chiroptera (bats), which are the two largest orders of mammals. Neognathae also contains some very small orders, often birds of unclear relationships like the hoatzin.

The neognaths have fused metacarpals, an elongate third finger, and 13 or fewer vertebrae. They differ from the Palaeognathae in features like the structure of their jawbones. Neognathae means "new jaws", but it seems that the supposedly "more ancient" paleognath jaws are among the few apomorphic (more derived) features of the palaeognaths, meaning that the respective jaw structure of these groups is not informative in terms of comparative evolution. However, a neognath-like palate is also present in ornithuran birds like Ichthyornis.

== Taxonomy and systematics ==
Neognathae was long ranked as a superorder subdivided into orders. Attempts to organise this group further, as in the Conspectus of Charles Lucien Bonaparte, were never accepted by a significant majority of ornithologists. Until the 1980s, there was little subdivision of the Aves in general, and even less of phylogenetic merit. Since then, the availability of massive amounts of new data from fossils (especially Enantiornithes and other Mesozoic birds) and molecular (DNA and protein) sequences allowed scientists to refine the classification. With new groups of neognath orders being verified, the taxonomic rank of the group needed to shift. Most researchers have now employed the unranked taxa of phylogenetic nomenclature.

Neognathae is now universally accepted to subdivide into two lineages, the "fowl" clade Galloanseres and the Neoaves (sometimes called "higher neognaths"). The formal PhyloCode definition given to Neognathae by George Sangster and colleagues in 2022 is "the least inclusive crown clade containing Gallus gallus and Passer domesticus".

The subdivisions of Neoaves are still not well resolved, but several monophyletic lineages have been proposed, such as the Mirandornithes, Cypselomorphae, Metaves, and Coronaves. Although groups such as the former two (uniting a few closely related orders) are robustly supported, this cannot be said for the groups Metaves and Coronaves for which there is no material evidence at present, while the Mesozoic record of Neognathae is at present utterly devoid of birds that should have been present if these proposed clades were real.

=== Systematics ===
The orders are arranged in a sequence that attempts to follow the modern view on neognath phylogeny. It differs from the widely used Clements taxonomy as well as from the Sibley-Ahlquist taxonomy, combining those elements from each that more modern research agrees with while updating those that are refuted. Most of the changes affect those "higher landbirds" that are sometimes united as near passerines.

==== Neognathia ====
Feduccia defined the clade Neognathia as birds whose palatal mobility increased due to the following modifications (Feduccia 1980, 1996):

- Loss of the Basipterygoid articulation with the cranium.
- Development of a pterygoid/palatine joint.
- Reduction of the vomer, such that it does not reach caudally to the pterygoid, or is lost entirely.

==== Relationships ====
Neognathae cladogram of modern bird relationships based on Stiller et al. (2024).

Neognathae comprises 39 extant orders and are categorized as:

- Neognathae
  - Galloanserae
    - Galliformes (chickens (including the red junglefowl), pheasants, quails, turkeys, peafowl, etc.)
    - Anseriformes (ducks, geese, swans, screamers, and magpie geese)
  - Neoaves
    - - Mirandornithes
        - Phoenicopteriformes (flamingos)
        - Podicipediformes (grebes)
    - - Columbaves
        - Columbimorphae
          - Columbiformes (pigeons and doves)
          - Pteroclimesites
            - Mesitornithiformes (mesites)
            - Pterocliformes (sandgrouse)
        - Otidimorphae
          - Cuculiformes (cuckoos)
          - Musophagotides
            - Otidiformes (bustards)
            - Musophagiformes (turacos)
      - Passerea
        - Elementaves
          - - Gruae
              - Opisthocomiformes (hoatzins)
              - Gruimorphae
                - Gruiformes (rails and cranes)
                - Charadriiformes (waders, gulls, auks and relatives)
          - - Strisores
              - Caprimulgiformes (nightjars)
              - Vanescaves
                - Nyctibiiformes (potoos)
                - - Steatornithiformes (oilbirds)
                  - Letornithes
                    - Podargiformes (frogmouths)
                    - Daedalornithes
                      - Aegotheliformes (owlet-nightjars)
                      - Apodiformes (swifts, treeswifts and hummingbirds)
            - Phaethoquornithes
              - Eurypygimorphae
                - Phaethontiformes (tropicbirds)
                - Eurypygiformes (sunbitterns and kagus)
              - Aequornithes
                - Gaviiformes (loons/divers)
                - Feraequornithes
                  - Austrodyptornithes
                    - Procellariiformes (albatrosses, shearwaters, and petrels)
                    - Sphenisciformes (penguins)
                  - Pelecanimorphae
                    - Ciconiiformes (storks)
                    - Pelecanes
                      - Suliformes (frigatebirds, gannets, cormorants, and darters)
                      - Pelecaniformes (pelicans, herons and ibises)
        - Telluraves
          - Afroaves
            - Hieraves
              - Strigiformes (owls)
              - Accipitriformes (vultures, kites, hawks, and eagles)
            - Coraciimorphae
              - Coliiformes (mousebirds)
              - Cavitaves
                - Leptosomiformes (cuckoo rollers)
                - Eucavitaves
                  - Trogoniformes (trogons)
                  - Picocoraciae
                    - Bucerotiformes (hornbills, hoopoes and relatives)
                    - Picodynastornithes
                      - Coraciiformes (kingfishers, rollers, bee-eaters and relatives)
                      - Piciformes (woodpeckers, toucans and relatives)
          - Australaves
            - Cariamiformes (seriemas)
            - Eufalconimorphae
              - Falconiformes (falcons and caracaras)
              - Psittacopasserae
                - Psittaciformes (parrots)
                - Passeriformes (passerines)
