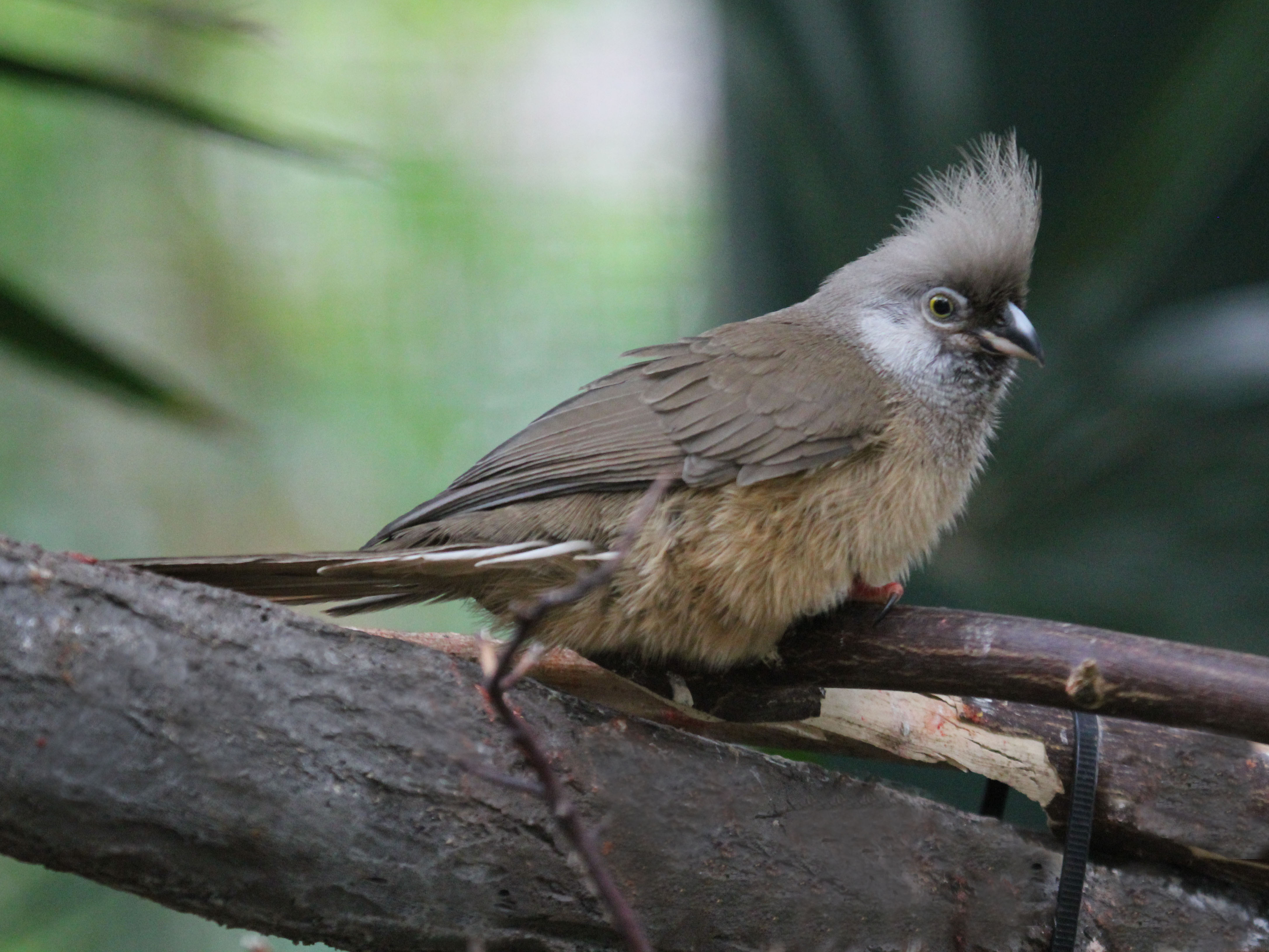
- Speckled mousebird (Colius striatus)

Scientific classification
- Kingdom: Animalia
- Phylum: Chordata
- Class: Aves
- Clade: Afroaves
- Clade: Coraciimorphae; Sibley & Ahlquist, 1990

Subclades
- Coliiformes; Cavitaves

= Coraciimorphae =

Coraciimorphae Temporal range: Paleocene - Holocene, 62.5–0 Ma

Clade of birds

Coraciimorphae is a clade of birds that contains the order Coliiformes (mousebirds) and the clade Cavitaves (a large assemblage of birds that includes woodpeckers, kingfishers and trogons). The name however was coined in the 1990s by Sibley and Ahlquist based on their DNA-DNA hybridization studies conducted in the late 1970s and throughout the 1980s. However their Coraciimorphae only contains Trogoniformes and Coraciiformes. Coraciimorphae was defined in the PhyloCode by George Sangster and colleagues in 2022 as "the least inclusive crown clade containing Colius colius and Picus viridis, but not Accipiter nisus or Passer domesticus".

== Taxonomy ==
Cladogram of Coraciimorphae relationships based on Jarvis, E.D. et al. (2014) with some clade names after Yuri, T. et al. (2013).

- Coraciimorphae
  - Coliiformes (mousebirds)
  - Cavitaves
    - Leptosomiformes (cuckoo roller)
    - Eucavitaves
      - Trogoniformes (trogons)
      - Picocoraciae
        - Bucerotiformes (hornbills and hoopoes)
        - Picodynastornithes
          - Coraciiformes (rollers and kingfishers)
          - Piciformes (woodpeckers and toucans)
