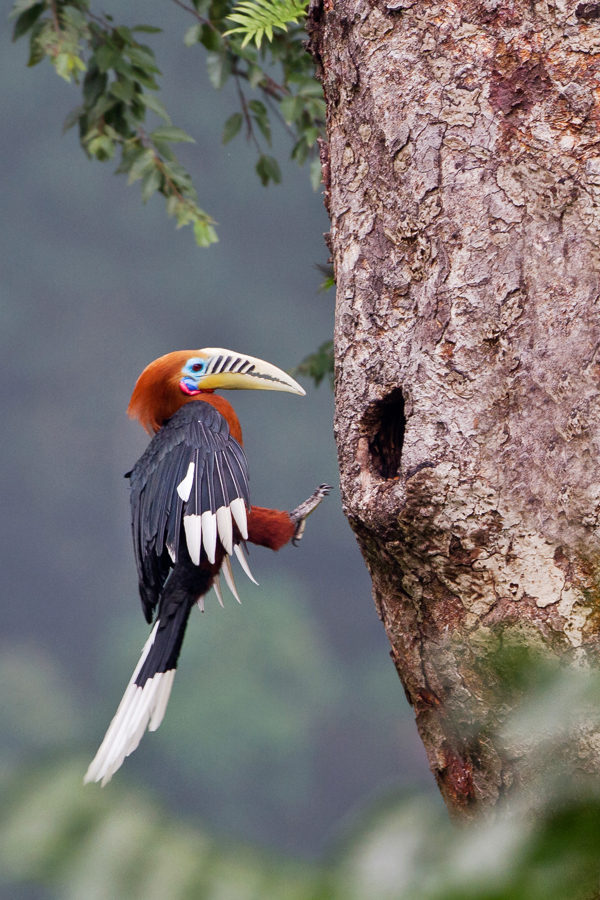
- Rufous-necked hornbill, Aceros nipalensis at nesting cavity

Scientific classification
- Kingdom: Animalia
- Phylum: Chordata
- Class: Aves
- Clade: Coraciimorphae
- Clade: Cavitaves; Yuri, Kimball, Harshman, Bowie, Braun, Chojnowski, Han, Hackett, Huddleston, Moore, Reddy, Sheldon, Steadman, Witt and Braun, 2013

Clades
- Leptosomiformes; Eucavitaves

= Cavitaves =

Clade of birds

Cavitaves is a clade that contains the order Leptosomiformes (cuckoo roller) and the clade Eucavitaves (a large assemblage of birds that includes woodpeckers, kingfishers and trogons). This group was defined in the PhyloCode by George Sangster and colleagues in 2022 as "the least inclusive crown clade containing Leptosomus discolor and Picus viridis". The name refers to the fact that the majority of them nest in cavities.

- Cavitaves
  - Leptosomiformes (cuckoo roller)
  - Eucavitaves
    - Trogoniformes (trogons)
    - Picocoraciae
      - Bucerotiformes (hornbills and hoopoes)
      - Picodynastornithes
        - Coraciiformes (rollers and kingfishers)
        - Piciformes (woodpeckers and toucans)
