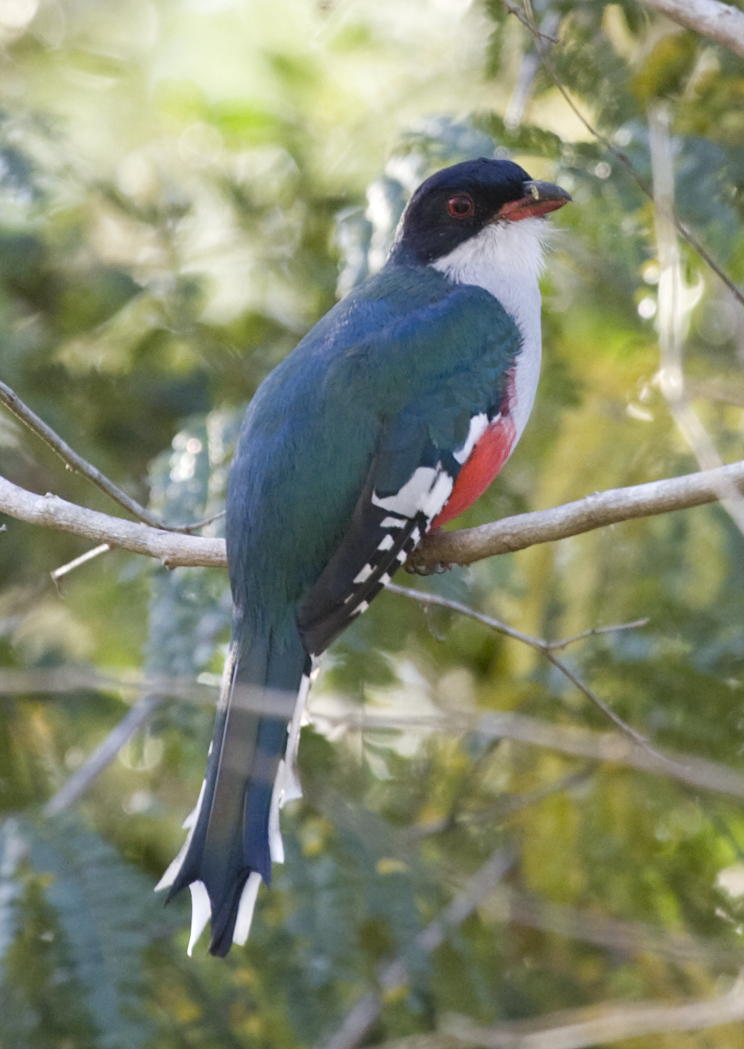
- Cuban trogon, Priotelus temnurus

Scientific classification
- Kingdom: Animalia
- Phylum: Chordata
- Class: Aves
- Clade: Cavitaves
- Clade: Eucavitaves; Kimball et al., 2013

Subclades
- Trogoniformes; Picocoraciae

= Eucavitaves =

Clade of birds

Eucavitaves is a clade that contains the order Trogoniformes (trogons) and the clade Picocoraciae (a large assemblage of birds that includes woodpeckers, kingfishers, hornbills and hoopoes). The group was defined in the PhyloCode by George Sangster and colleagues in 2022 as "the least inclusive crown clade containing Trogon viridis and Picus viridis". The name refers to the fact that the majority of them nest in cavities.

- Cavitaves
  - Leptosomiformes (cuckoo roller)
  - Eucavitaves
    - Trogoniformes (trogons)
    - Picocoraciae
      - Bucerotiformes (hornbills and hoopoes)
      - Picodynastornithes
        - Coraciiformes (rollers and kingfishers)
        - Piciformes (woodpeckers and toucans)

Cladogram of Eucavitaves relationships based on Jarvis, E.D. et al. (2014) with some clade names after Yuri, T. et al. (2013) and Kimball 2013.
