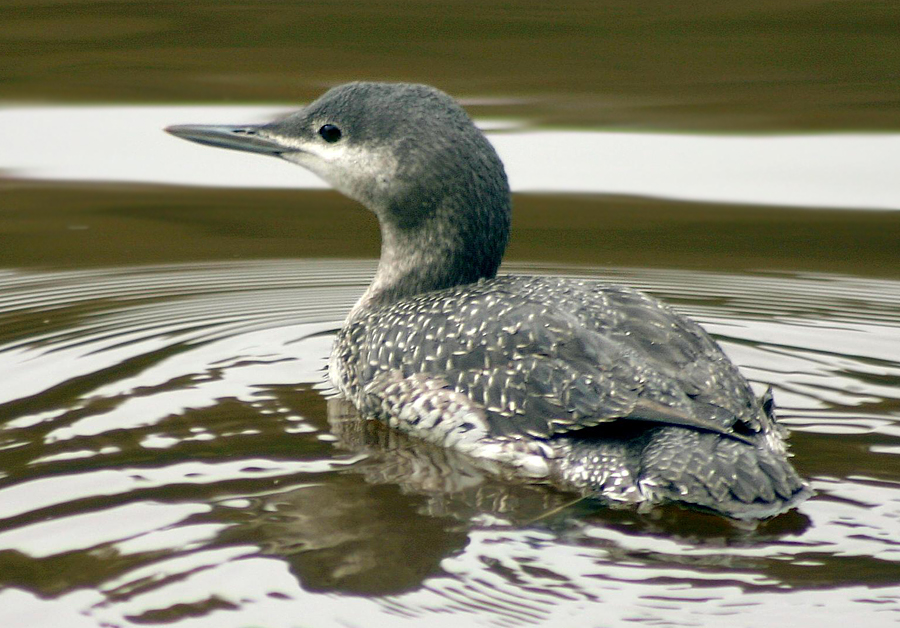
- Juvenile red-throated loon (Gavia stellata)

Scientific classification
- Kingdom: Animalia
- Phylum: Chordata
- Class: Aves
- Clade: Neoaves
- Clade: Phaethoquornithes; Sangster et al., 2022

Subgroups
- Phaethontimorphae; Aequornithes

Synonyms
- Ardeae

= Phaethoquornithes =

Phaethoquornithes Temporal range: Maastrichtian–Recent, ~72–0 Ma

Taxon of birds

Phaethoquornithes is a clade of birds that contains Eurypygimorphae and Aequornithes, which was first recovered by genome analysis in 2014. Members of Eurypygimorphae were originally classified in the obsolete group Metaves, and Aequornithes were classified as the sister taxon to Musophagiformes or Gruiformes.

This group has also been informally called Ardeae. Older classifications have used Ardeae in a different sense, as a suborder of Ciconiiformes containing herons and related species. George Sangster and colleagues in 2022 named and defined this clade in the PhyloCode as the least inclusive crown clade containing Phaethon aethereus and Pelecanus onocrotalus, but not Apus apus, Charadrius hiaticula, Musophaga violacea, or Passer domesticus.

- Phaethoquornithes
  - Eurypygimorphae
    - Phaethontiformes (tropicbirds)
    - Eurypygiformes (sunbittern and kagu)
  - Aequornithes
    - Gaviiformes (loons/divers)
    - Feraequornithes
      - Austrodyptornithes
        - Procellariiformes (albatrosses, shearwaters, and petrels)
        - Sphenisciformes (penguins)
      - Pelecanimorphae
        - Ciconiiformes (storks)
        - Pelecanes
          - Suliformes (frigatebirds, gannets, cormorants, and darters)
          - Pelecaniformes (pelicans, herons and ibises)

Cladogram based on Kuhl et al. (2020) and Stiller et al. (2024), with clade names following Sangster et al (2022).
