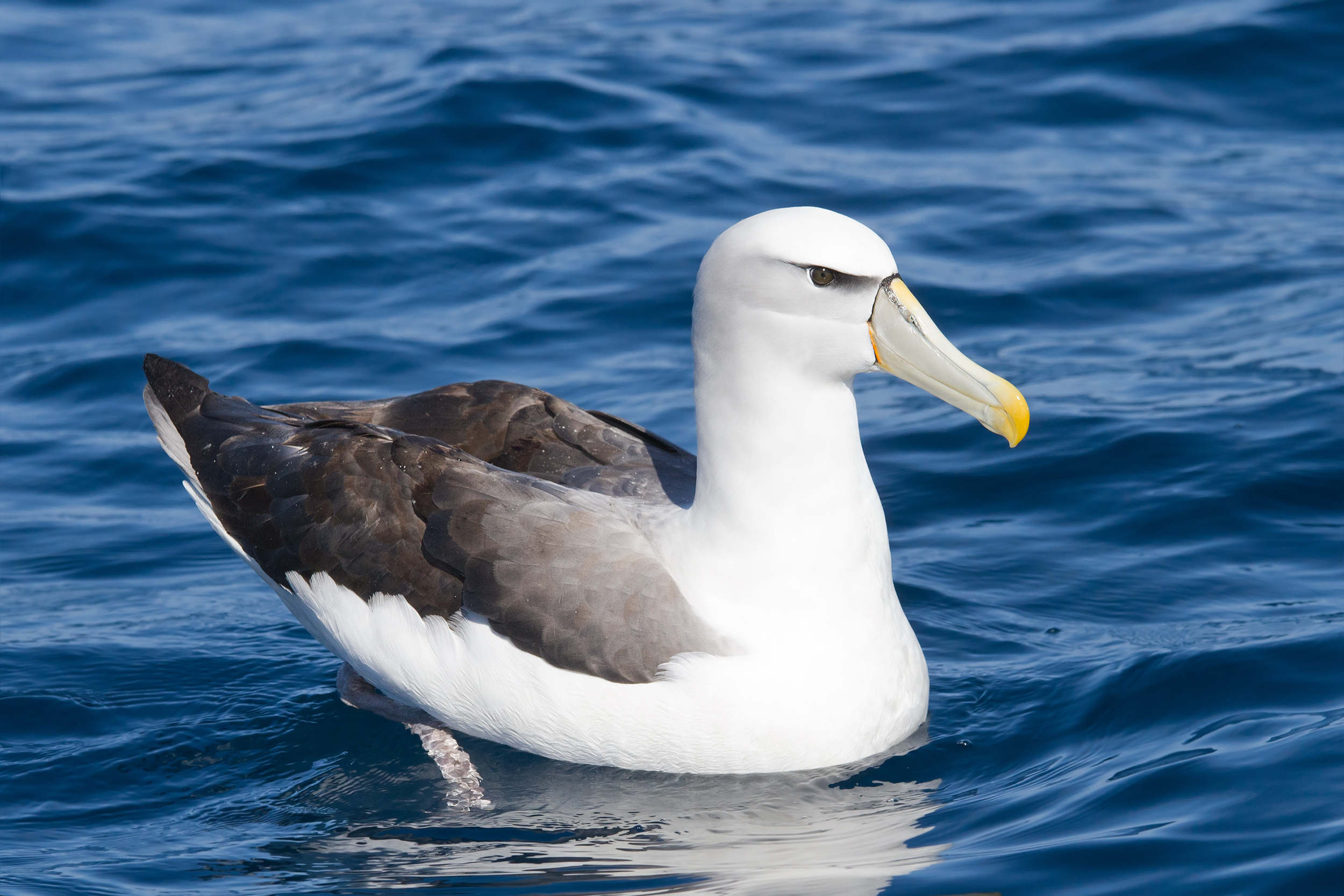
- Shy albatross (Thalassarche cauta)

Scientific classification
- Kingdom: Animalia
- Phylum: Chordata
- Class: Aves
- Clade: Phaethoquornithes
- Clade: Aequornithes; Mayr, 2010

Clades
- †Pujatopouli; Gaviiformes; Feraequornithes Sangster & Mayr, 2021; Austrodyptornithes; Pelecanimorphae

= Aequornithes =

Aequornithes Temporal range: Maastrichtian–Recent, ~72–0 Ma

Clade of birds

Aequornithes (/iːkwɔːrˈnɪθiːz/, from Latin aequor, expanse of water + Greek ornithes, birds), or core water birds, are defined in the PhyloCode as "the least inclusive crown clade containing Pelecanus onocrotalus and Gavia immer", that is, the last common ancestor of the great white pelican and the common loon, as well as its descendants, extinct and extant.

Aequornithes, as currently understood, includes the clades Gaviiformes (loons), Sphenisciformes (penguins), Procellariiformes (petrels and albatrosses), Ciconiiformes (storks), Suliformes (gannets and cormorants) and Pelecaniformes (pelicans and herons). The monophyly of this grouping is supported by several molecular phylogenetic studies. It does not include several unrelated groups of aquatic birds such as flamingos and grebes (Mirandornithes), shorebirds, gulls, and auks (Charadriiformes), or the Anseriformes (waterfowl). The group first appeared during the Maastrichtian stage of the Late Cretaceous, with the earliest known member being Pujatopouli from the López de Bertodano Formation of Seymour Island, Antarctica.

Based on a whole-genome analysis of the bird orders, the kagu and sunbittern (Eurypygiformes) and the three species of tropicbirds (Phaethontiformes) together styled as the Eurypygimorphae are the closest sister group of the Aequornithes, in a clade later named Phaethoquornithes.

== Phylogeny ==
The cladogram below is based on Burleigh, J.G. et al. (2015) and Stiller et al. (2024) with some names after Sangster, G. & Mayr, G. (2021).

- Aequornithes
  - Gaviiformes (loons/divers)
  - Feraequornithes
    - Austrodyptornithes
      - Procellariiformes (albatrosses, shearwaters, and petrels)
      - Sphenisciformes (penguins)
    - Pelecanimorphae
      - Ciconiiformes (storks)
      - Pelecanes
        - Suliformes (frigatebirds, gannets, cormorants, and darters)
        - Pelecaniformes (pelicans, herons and ibises)

The clade Feraequornithes was named by Sangster & Mayr, 2021 to include the Pelecanimorphae and Procellariimorphae to the exclusion of the loons (Gaviiformes). They defined this clade in the PhyloCode as "the least inclusive clade containing Pelecanus onocrotalus and Procellaria aequinoctialis".
