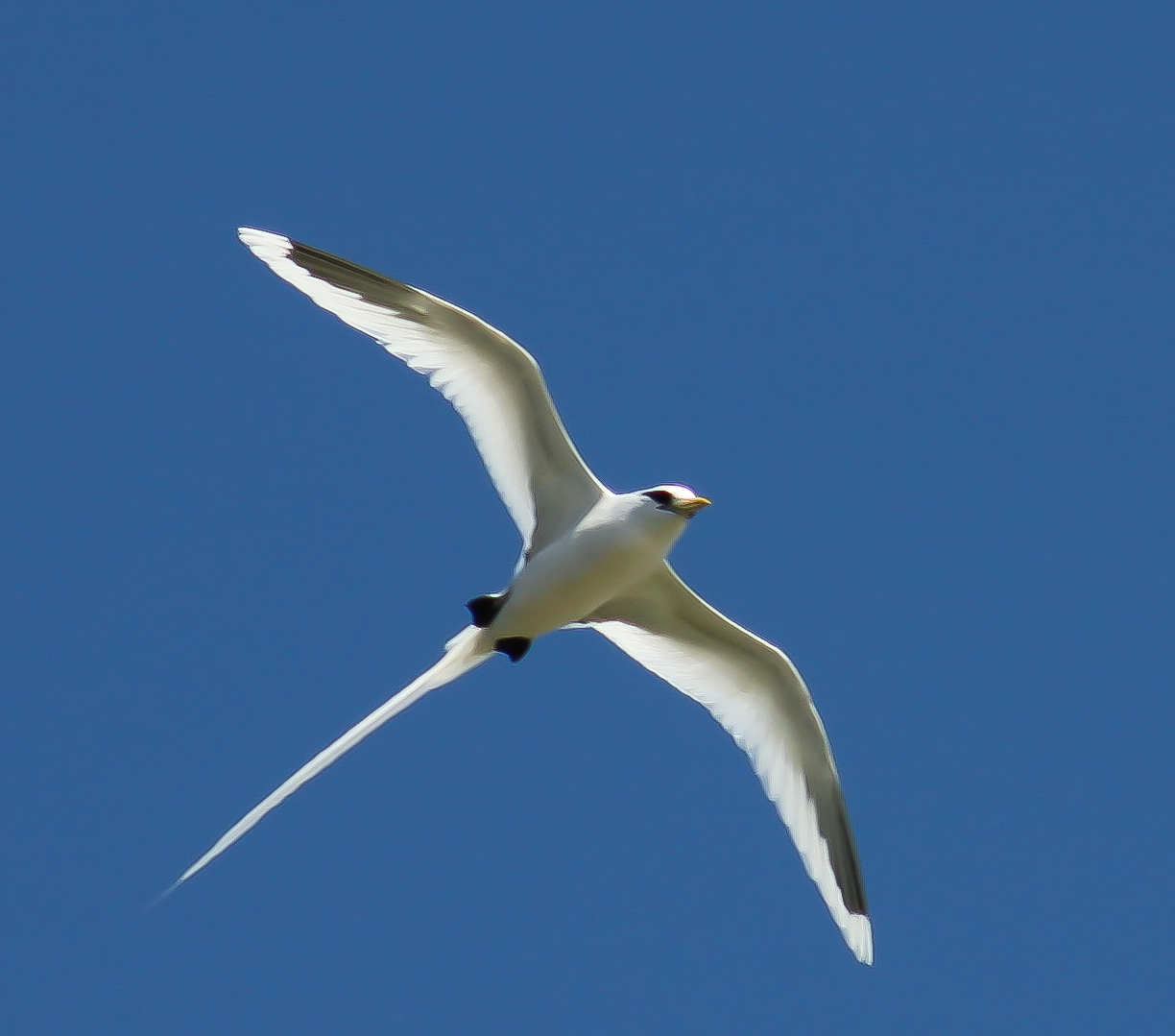

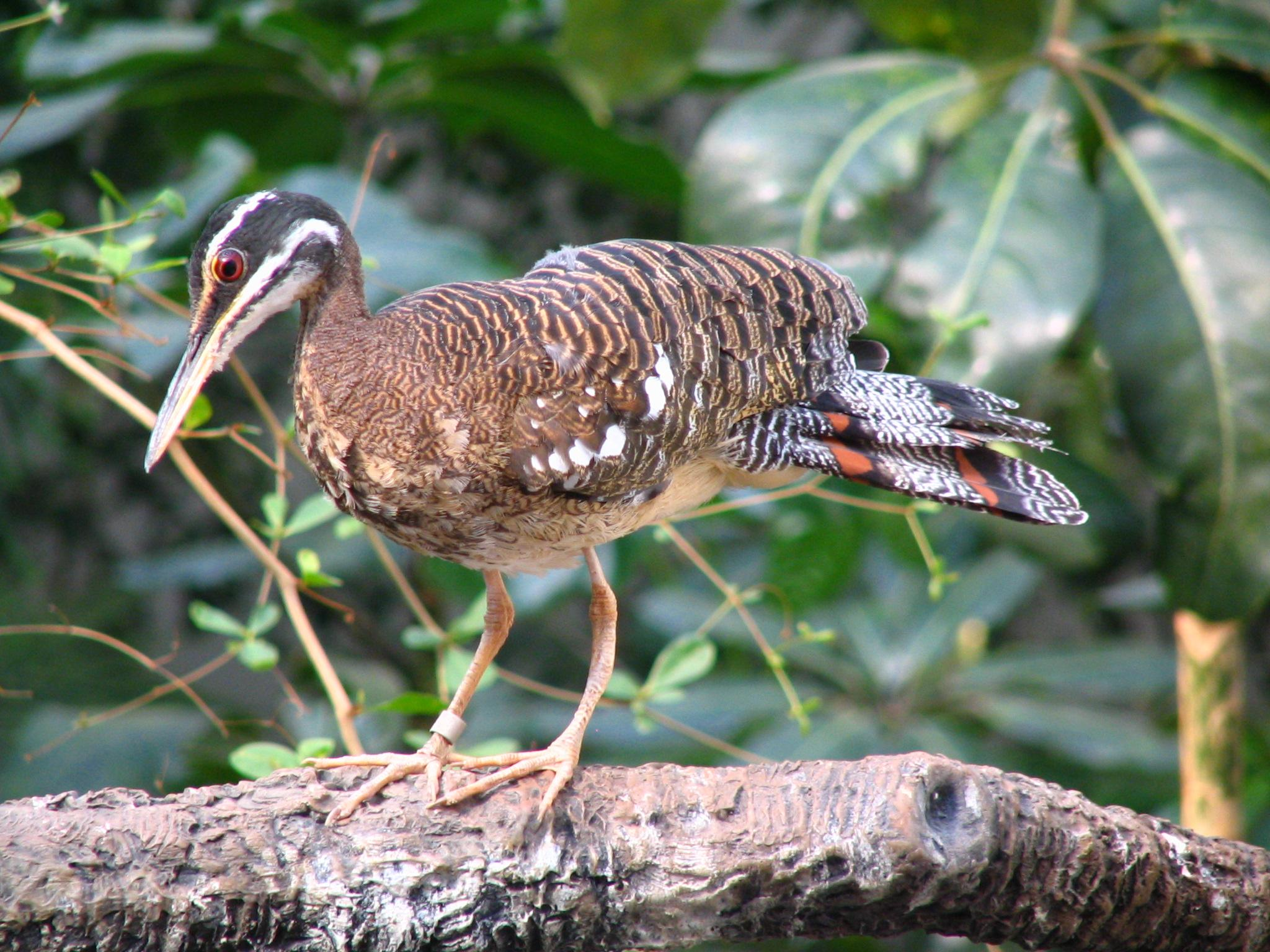
- Top: white-tailed tropicbird (Phaethontiformes); Bottom: sunbittern (Eurypygiformes)

Scientific classification
- Kingdom: Animalia
- Phylum: Chordata
- Class: Aves
- Clade: Phaethoquornithes
- Clade: Eurypygimorphae; Fürbringer, 1888

Orders
- Phaethontiformes; Eurypygiformes

= Phaethontimorphae =

Phaethontimorphae Temporal range: Early Paleocene - present Possible Maastrichtian record

Clade of birds

Phaethontimorphae or Eurypygimorphae is a clade of birds that contains the orders Phaethontiformes (tropicbirds) and Eurypygiformes (kagu and sunbittern) recovered by genome analysis. The relationship was first identified in 2013 based on their nuclear genes. This group was defined in the PhyloCode by George Sangster and colleagues in 2022 as "the least inclusive crown clade containing Phaethon aethereus, Eurypyga helias, and Rhynochetos jubatus". Historically these birds were placed at different parts of the tree, with tropicbirds in Pelecaniformes and the kagu and sunbittern in Gruiformes. Some genetic analyses have placed the eurypygimorph taxa in the controversial and obsolete clade Metaves, with uncertain placement within that group. More recent molecular studies support their grouping together in Eurypygimorphae, which is usually recovered as the sister taxon to Aequornithes within Phaethoquornithes.
