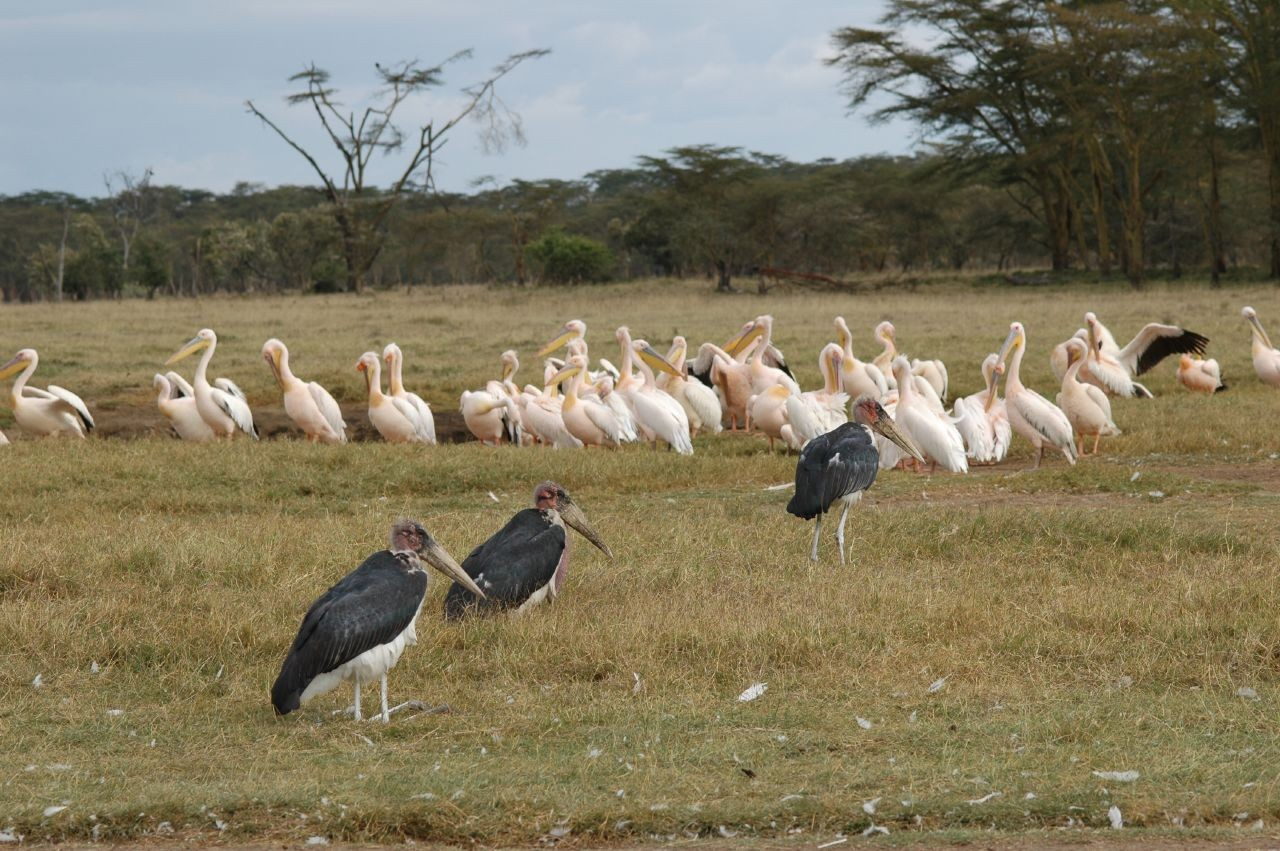
- White pelicans (Pelecanus onocrotalus) and marabou storks (Leptoptilos crumenifer) in Lake Nakuru National Park.

Scientific classification
- Kingdom: Animalia
- Phylum: Chordata
- Class: Aves
- Clade: Feraequornithes
- Superorder: Pelecanimorphae; Livezey & Zusi, 2007

Clades
- Ciconiiformes; Pelecanes Sangster et al., 2022; Suliformes; Pelecaniformes

= Pelecanimorphae =

Pelecanimorphae Temporal range: Eocene–recent, 50–0 Ma

Clade of birds

Pelecanimorphae is a clade of aequornithean birds that comprises the orders Ciconiiformes, Suliformes and Pelecaniformes. In the past the name has been used as a synonym for Pelecaniformes. Pelecanimorphae is defined in the PhyloCode by George Sangster and colleagues in 2022 as "the least inclusive clade containing Pelecanus onocrotalus, Sula leucogaster, and Ciconia ciconia". The less inclusive clade Pelecanes was named by Sangster et al, 2022 to unite Pelecaniformes and Suliformes and defined in the PhyloCode as the "least inclusive crown clade containing Pelecanus onocrotalus and Sula leucogaster".

This cladogram follows the hypothesis that herons are sister to Pelecani.

- Pelecanimorphae
  - Ciconiiformes
    Ciconiidae (storks)
  - Pelecanes
    - Suliformes
      - Fregatidae (frigatebirds)
      - - Sulidae (boobies and gannets)
        - - Anhingidae (darters)
          - Phalacrocoracidae (cormorants)
    - Pelecaniformes
      - Threskiornithidae (ibises and spoonbills)
      - - Ardeidae (herons)
        - Pelecani
          - Scopidae (hamerkop)
          - - Balaenicipitidae (shoebill)
            - Pelecanidae (pelicans)
