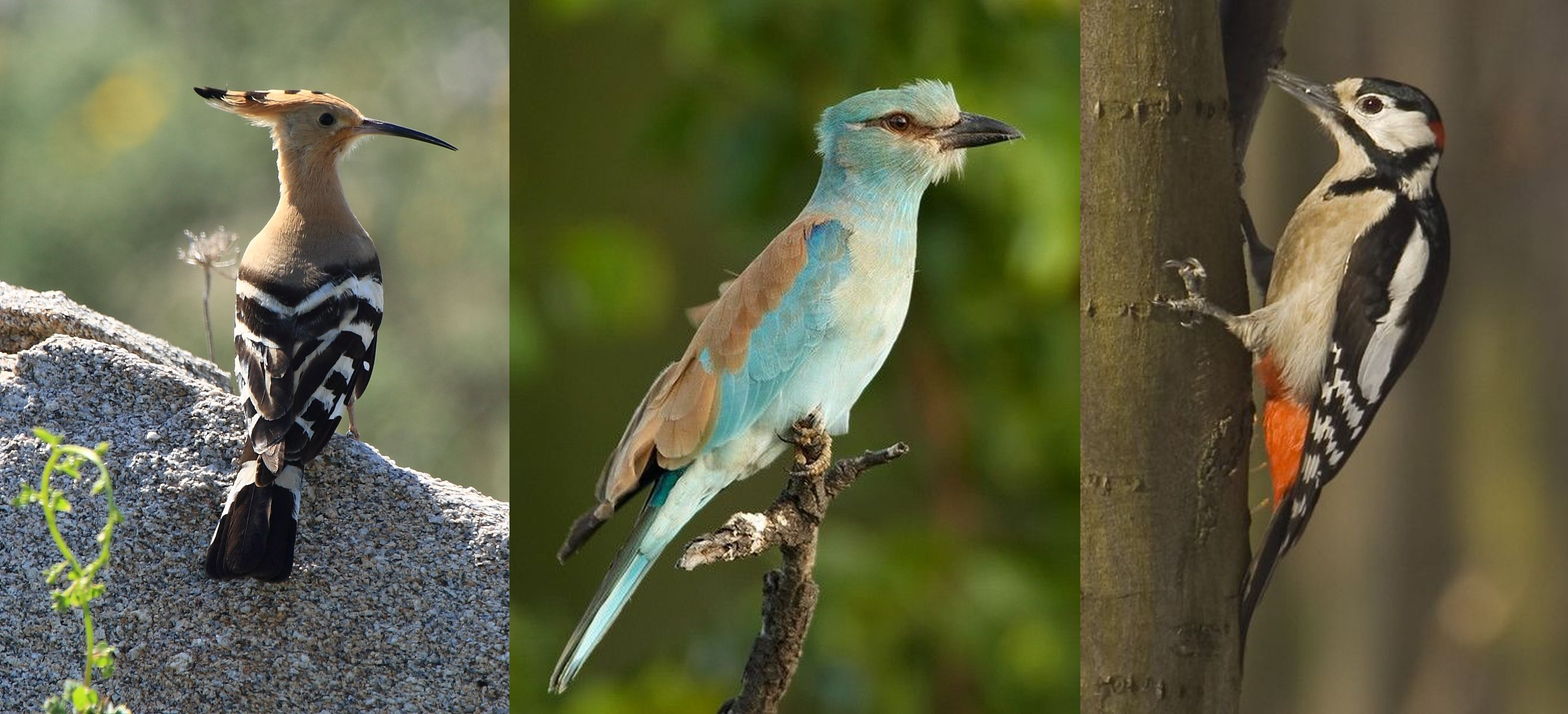
- From left to right: Hoopoe (Upupa epops), European roller (Coracias garrulus) and Great spotted woodpecker (Dendrocopos major)

Scientific classification
- Kingdom: Animalia
- Phylum: Chordata
- Class: Aves
- Clade: Eucavitaves
- Clade: Picocoraciae; Mayr, 2010

Clades
- Bucerotiformes; Picodynastornithes

= Picocoraciae =

Clade of birds

Picocoraciae is a clade that contains the order Bucerotiformes (hornbills and hoopoes) and the clade Picodynastornithes (containing birds like kingfishers and rollers, and woodpeckers and toucans) supported by various genetic analysis and morphological studies. While these studies supported a sister grouping of Coraciiformes and Piciformes, a large scale, sparse supermatrix has suggested alternative sister relationship between Bucerotiformes and Piciformes instead. This group was defined in the PhyloCode by George Sangster and colleagues in 2022 as "the least inclusive crown clade containing Buceros rhinoceros, Coracias garrulus, and Picus viridis".

- Picocoraciae
  - Bucerotiformes (hornbills, hoopoe and wood hoopoes)
  - Picodynastornithes
    - Coraciiformes (rollers and kingfishers)
    - Piciformes (woodpeckers and toucans)
