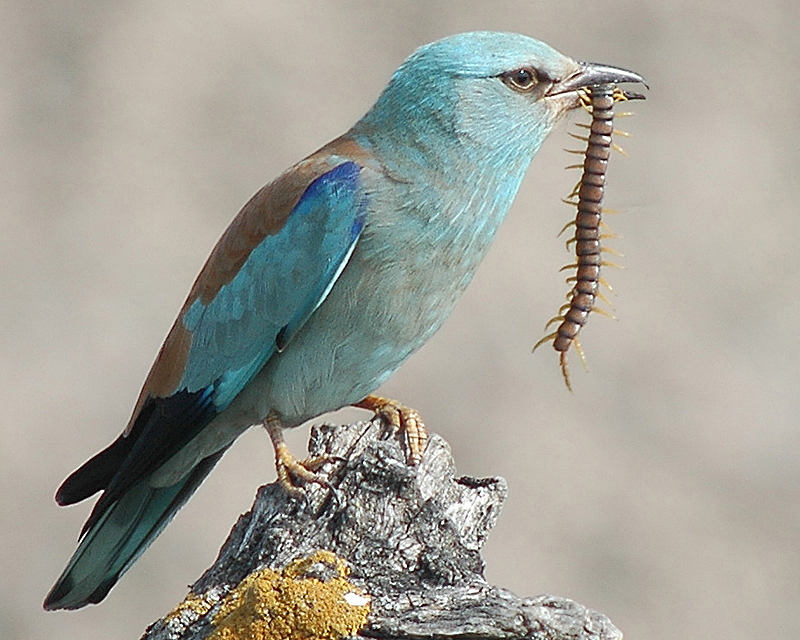
- European roller (Coracias garrulus)
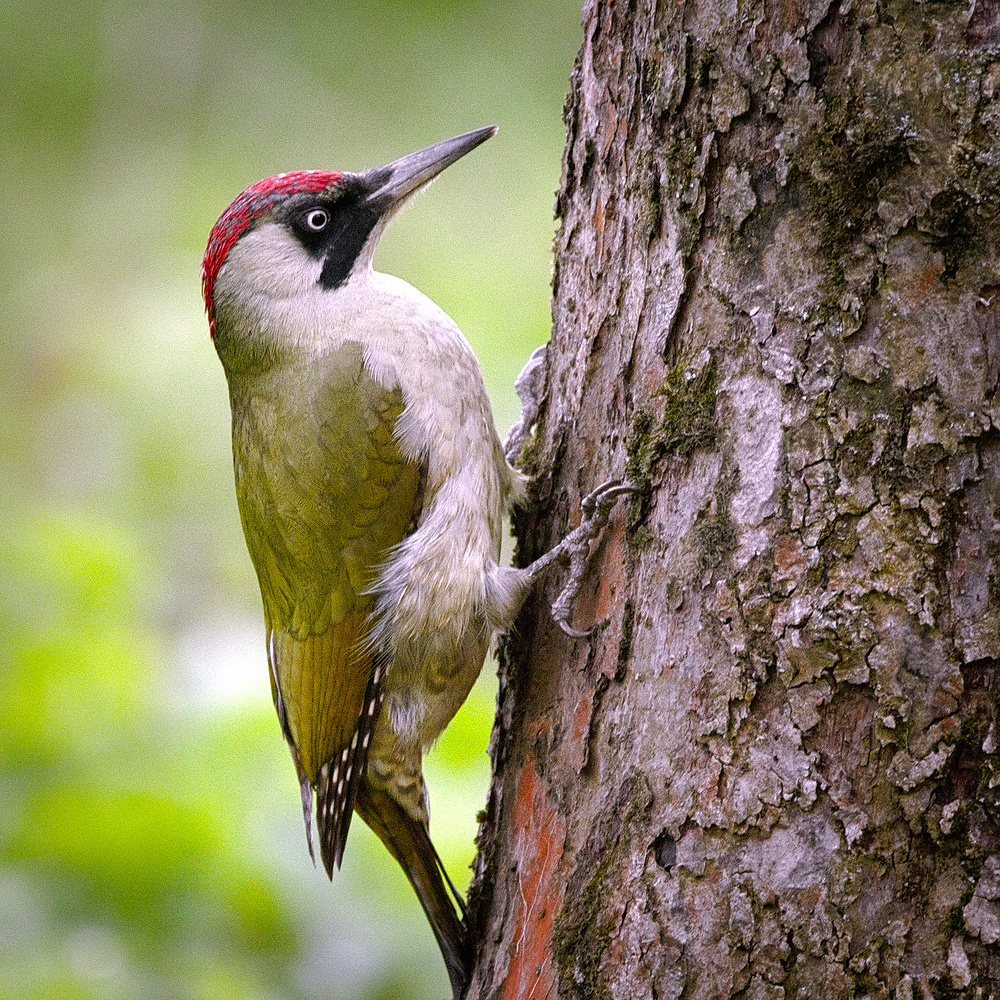
- European green woodpecker (Picus viridis)

Scientific classification
- Kingdom: Animalia
- Phylum: Chordata
- Class: Aves
- Clade: Picocoraciae
- Clade: Picodynastornithes; Yuri et al., 2013

Orders
- Coraciiformes; Piciformes

= Picodynastornithes =

Picodynastornithes Temporal range: Early Eocene to present

Clade of birds

Picodynastornithes is a clade that contains the orders Coraciiformes (rollers and kingfishers) and Piciformes (woodpeckers and toucans). This grouping also has current and historical support from molecular and morphological studies. This group was defined in the PhyloCode by George Sangster and colleagues in 2022 as "the least inclusive crown clade containing Coracias garrulus, Alcedo atthis, and Picus viridis".
