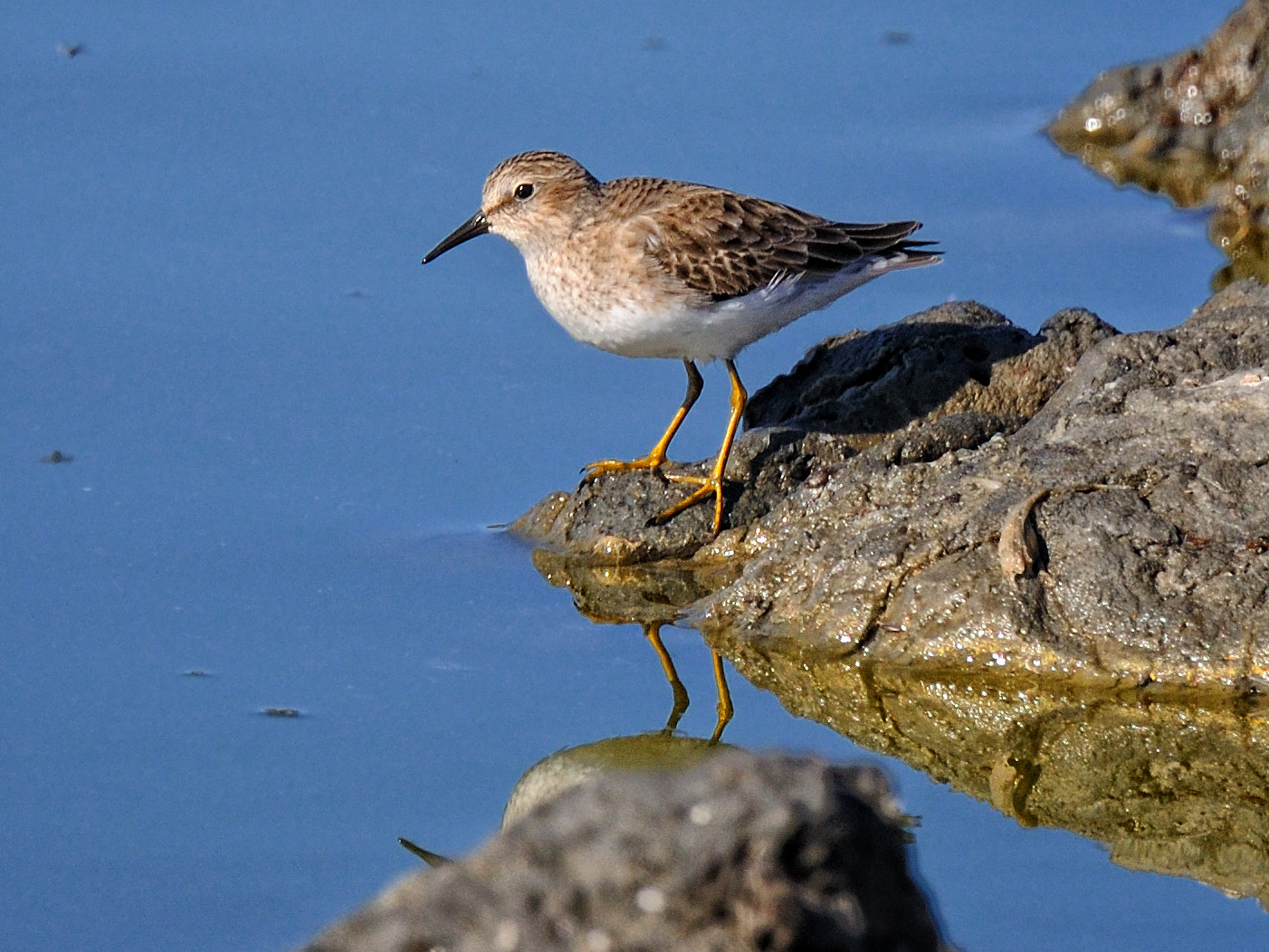
- Least sandpiper, Calidris minutilla

Scientific classification
- Domain: Eukaryota
- Kingdom: Animalia
- Phylum: Chordata
- Class: Aves
- Clade: Neoaves
- Clade: Terrestrornithes; Livezey & Zusi, 2007

Subclades
- Charadriiformes; Dendrornithes; Mirandornithes?

= Terrestrornithes =

Terrestrornithes Temporal range: Late Cretaceous-Holocene, 75–0 Ma

Clade of birds

Terrestrornithes ("land birds") is a group of birds with controversial content. The clade was proposed in 2007 to unite the Charadriiformes (shore birds) and their possible close relatives, the Dendrornithes (most predatory and perching birds). It may also include a group known as the Mirandornithes, the flamingos and grebes, though the placement of this group is highly uncertain and they may be members of the Metaves instead.

A rough consensus of current research is reproduced below, based on Naish (2012).

- Terrestrornithes
  - - Mirandornithes? (flamingos & grebes)
    - Charadriiformes (shorebirds)
  - Dendrornithes?
    - Afroaves
      - Accipitriformes (eagles & hawks)
      - - - Coliiformes (mousebirds)
          - Strigiformes (owls)
        - Picocoraciae
          - Coracii (rollers & hornbills)
          - Piciformes (woodpeckers & toucans)
    - Australaves
      - Cariamidae (seriamas)
      - Eufalconimorphae
        - Falconidae (falcons)
        - Psittacopasserae
          - Psittaciformes (parrots)
          - Passeriformes (songbirds, crows & kin)
