= Near passerine =

Tree-dwelling birds believed to be related to the true passerines

Near passerines and higher land-bird assemblage are terms of traditional, pre-cladistic taxonomy that have often been given to tree-dwelling birds or those most often believed to be related to the true passerines (order Passeriformes) owing to morphological and ecological similarities; the group corresponds to some extent with the non-passerine members of the Anomalogonatae of Alfred Henry Garrod.

== Biology ==
All near passerines are land birds. However, molecular data does not support the traditional arrangement; it is now clear that "near passerines" and "higher landbirds" are not synonymous.

In their analysis of genomic DNA, Per Ericson and colleagues revealed a lineage comprising Passeriformes, Psittaciformes and Falconiformes.

== Orders ==
Pterocliformes (sandgrouse), Columbiformes (pigeons), Cuculiformes (cuckoos), Caprimulgiformes (nightjars), and Apodiformes (swifts, hummingbirds) are no longer treated as near passerines. The true near-passerine families are the Psittaciformes (parrots), the Falconiformes (falcons), and the Cariamiformes (seriemas); these three orders, together with the Passeriformes make up the Australaves. Sister to the Australaves are the Afroaves (see Telluraves).

The phylogenetic relationships between the orders are:

- Australaves
  - - Cariamiformes – seriemas
    - - Falconiformes – falcons
      - - Psittaciformes – parrots
        - Passeriformes – passerines

== See also ==
- List of birds
