= Danielsraptor =

Danielsraptor Temporal range: early Eocene, 54.6–55 Ma

Scientific classification
- Kingdom: Animalia
- Phylum: Chordata
- Class: Aves
- Order: Falconiformes
- Family: †Masillaraptoridae
- Genus: †Danielsraptor; Mayr & Kitchener, 2022
- Species: †D. phorusrhacoides

Binomial name
- †Danielsraptor phorusrhacoides Mayr & Kitchener, 2022

Extinct genus of birds

Danielsraptor (meaning "Michael Daniels's thief") is an extinct genus of masillaraptorid bird from the Early Eocene (Ypresian) Walton Member of the London Clay Formation in Essex, United Kingdom. The genus contains a single species, D. phorusrhacoides, known from a partial skeleton.

== Discovery and naming ==
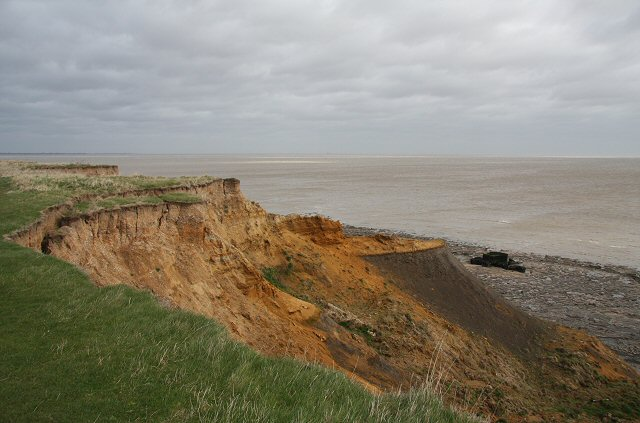
Cliffs near the type locality

The Danielsraptor fossil material was discovered in layers of the London Clay Formation (Walton Member), dated to the early Ypresian. This formation is located near Walton-on-the-Naze in Essex, England. The holotype, NMS.Z.2021.40.12, was collected in 1991 by Michael Daniels (who the taxon is named after). This specimen consists of a partial skeleton including the skull, vertebrae, fragmentary wing bones, elements of the pectoral girdle, pelvis, the majority of the legs, and various bone fragments still partially enclosed in matrix. An additional referred specimen, NMS.Z.2021.40.13, was found by Daniels in 1986. This specimen includes a partial sternum, right coracoid, scapula, furcula, and pygostyle.

In 2022, Gerald Mayr and Andrew C. Kitchener described Danielsraptor phorusrhacoides, a new genus and species of masillaraptorid, based on these fossil remains. The generic name, "Danielsraptor", honours Michael Daniels, who collected and studied bird fossils from the type locality. This is combined with the Latin "raptor", meaning "thief", in reference to a vernacular term for birds of prey. The specific name, "phorusrhacoides", references the extinct "terror bird" clade Phorusrhacidae, whose members had a similar bill shape.

== Description ==
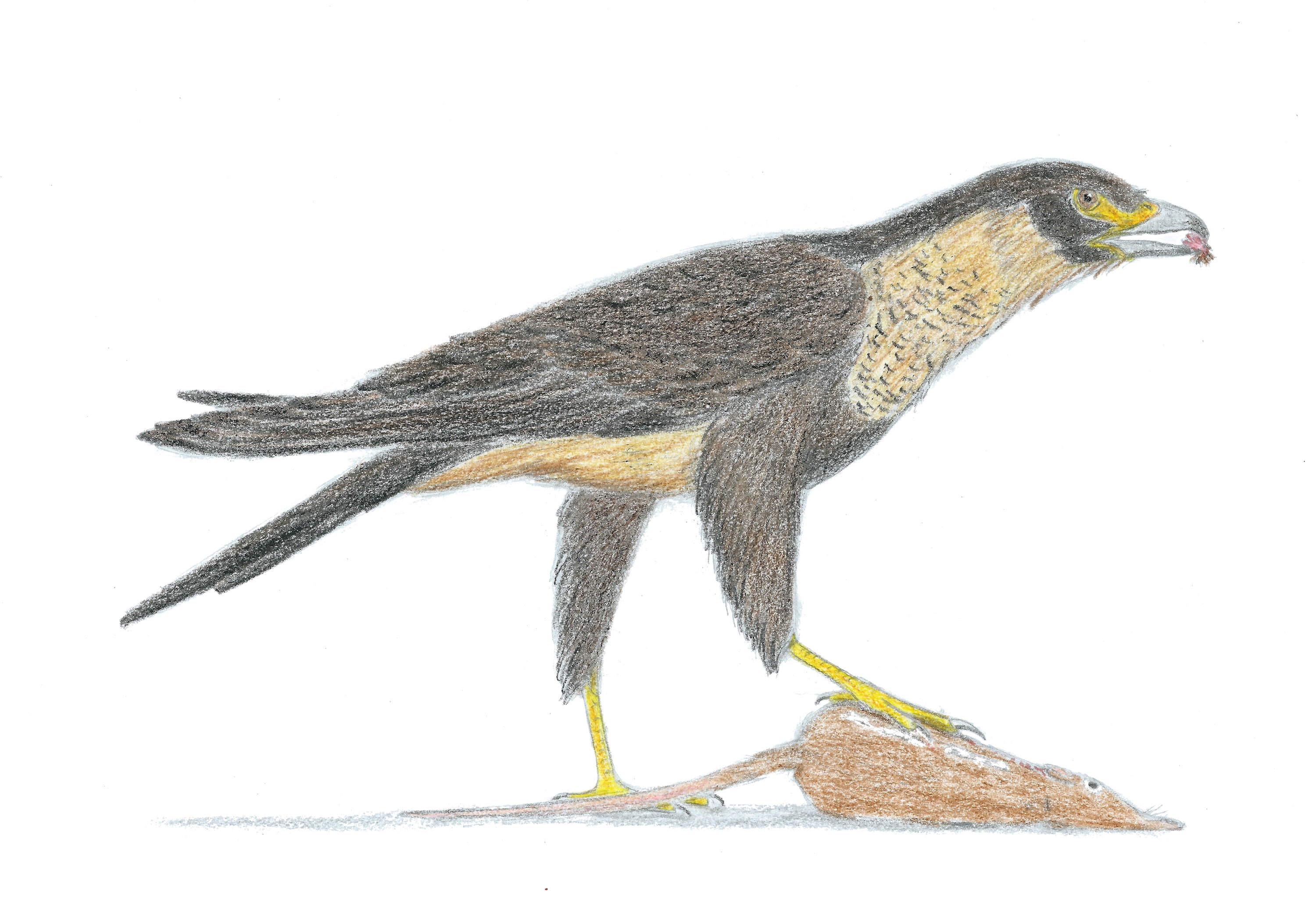
Life restoration of the closely related Masillaraptor

The describing authors concluded that Danielsraptor had a body shape very similar to the middle Eocene Masillaraptor of Germany. It had long legs, which may indicate that it had a terrestrial lifestyle, foraging on the ground similar to modern caracaras. It had a large pygostyle, indicating that it would have likely had long tail feathers. This, in addition to its long ulna, suggests that it was capable of well-developed flight. Its beak was similar to those of extinct phorusrhacids and extant caracaras.

== Classification ==
Danielsraptor represents one of two members of Masillaraptoridae within the Falconiformes. The cladogram below displays the results of the phylogenetic analysis by Mayr & Kitchener (2022):

- - Chauna torquata (southern screamer)
  - Australaves
    - Falconiformes
      - Caracara plancus (crested caracara)
      - Masillaraptoridae †
        - Masillaraptor parvunguis
        - Danielsraptor phorusrhacoides
    - Cariamiformes
      - Bathornis spp. †
      - Dynamopterus spp. †
      - - Cariama cristata (red-legged seriema)
        - Phorusrhacidae (terror birds) †
          - Llallawavis scagliai
          - Psilopterus lemoinei
          - Patagornis marshi

== See also ==
- Paleobiota of the London Clay
