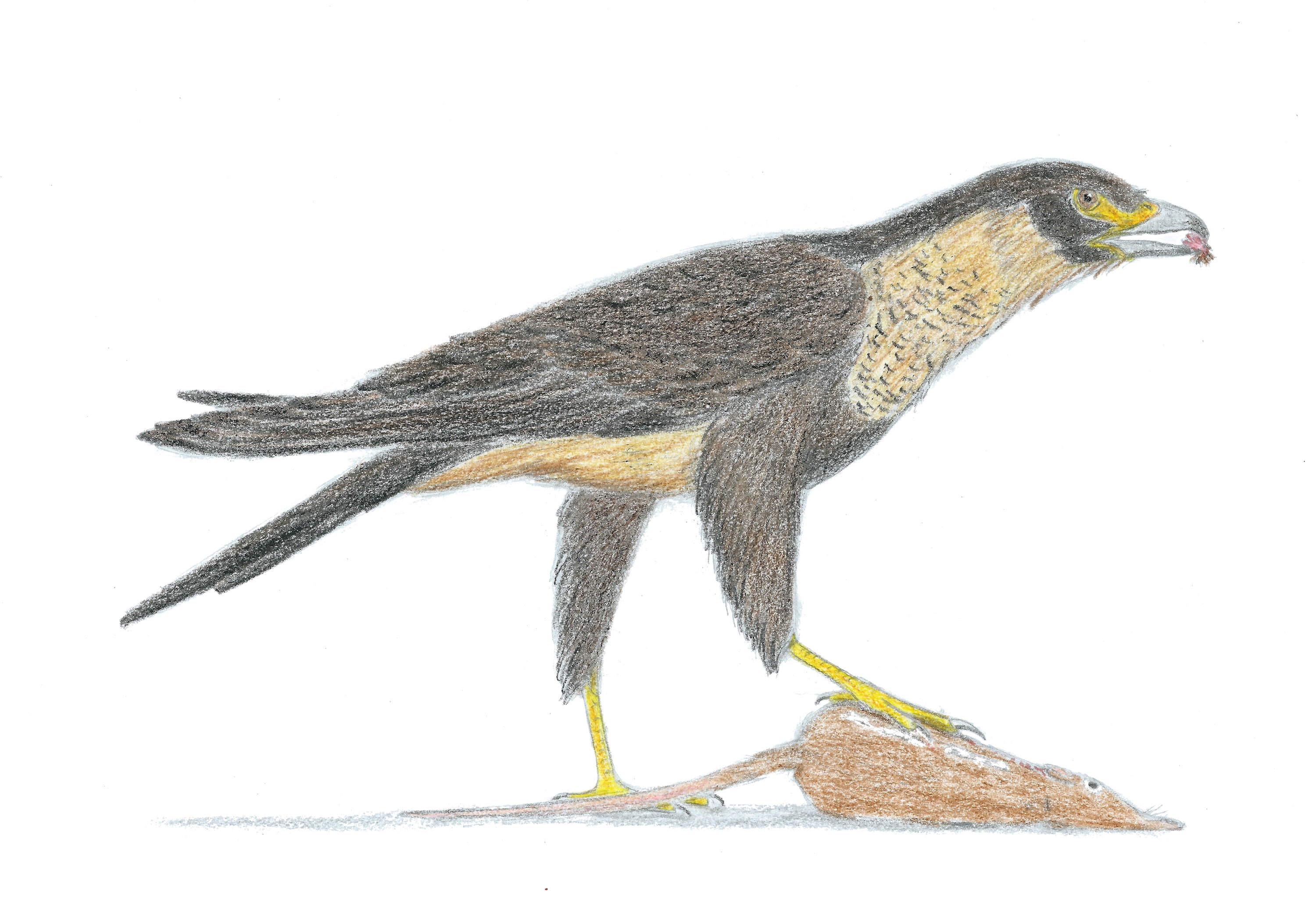
- Life restoration of Masillaraptor

Scientific classification
- Kingdom: Animalia
- Phylum: Chordata
- Class: Aves
- Order: Falconiformes
- Family: †Masillaraptoridae; Mayr, 2009

Genera
- †Danielsraptor; †Masillaraptor

= Masillaraptoridae =

Masillaraptorids Temporal range: early-middle Eocene, 54.6–47 Ma

Extinct family of birds

Masillaraptoridae is an extinct family of stem-group falconiform birds from the Eocene of Europe and the United States. They are noted for their relatively long legs. Two genera have been named: Danielsraptor, from the London Clay of England, and Masillaraptor, from Messel Pit in Germany and Green River Formation of Wyoming, US.

== Description ==
Masillaraptorids have long legs, which may indicate they had a terrestrial lifestyle, foraging on the ground similar to modern caracaras. They have large pygostyles, suggesting they would have likely had long tail feathers. This, in addition to their long ulnae, suggests they were capable of well-developed flight. Their beaks are similar to those of extinct phorusrhacids and extant caracaras.

== Classification ==
The cladogram below displays the phylogenetic position of Masillaraptoridae within the Falconiformes:

- - Chauna torquata (southern screamer)
  - Australaves
    - Falconiformes
      - Caracara plancus (crested caracara)
      - †Masillaraptoridae
        - Masillaraptor parvunguis
        - Danielsraptor phorusrhacoides
    - Cariamiformes
      - †Bathornis spp.
      - †Dynamopterus spp.
      - - Cariama cristata (red-legged seriema)
        - †Phorusrhacidae (terror birds)
          - Llallawavis scagliai
          - Psilopterus lemoinei
          - Patagornis marshi
