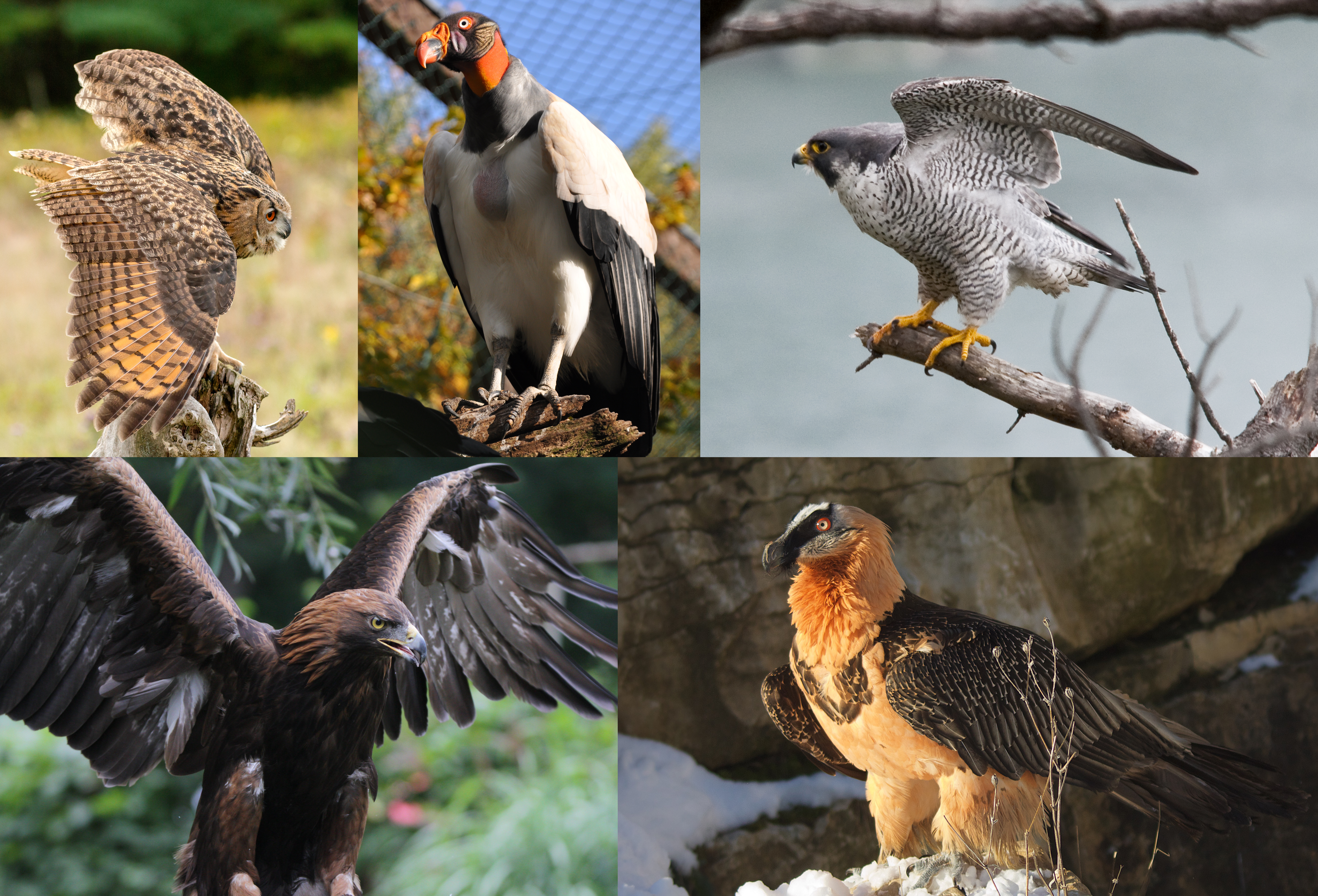
- Montage of extant predatory birds. From top left to right: Eurasian eagle-owl, king vulture, peregrine falcon, golden eagle and bearded vulture

Scientific classification
- Kingdom: Animalia
- Phylum: Chordata
- Class: Aves
- Clade: Passerea
- Clade: Telluraves

Groups included
- Strigiformes; Accipitriformes; Falconiformes

Cladistically included but traditionally excluded taxa
- Coraciimorphae; Psittacopasserae; Cariamiformes (occasionally included)

= Bird of prey =

Birds of prey

Paraphyletic group of birds

Birds of prey or predatory birds, also known as raptors, are hypercarnivorous species of bird that actively hunt and feed on other vertebrates, mainly mammals, reptiles, and smaller birds. In addition to speed and strength, these predators have keen eyesight for detecting prey from a distance or during flight, strong feet with sharp talons for grasping or killing prey, and powerful, curved beaks for tearing flesh. Although predatory birds primarily hunt live prey, many species—such as fish eagles, vultures, and condors—also scavenge and eat carrion.

Although the term "bird of prey" could theoretically be taken to include all birds that actively hunt and eat other animals, ornithologists typically use the narrower definition followed in this page, excluding many piscivorous predators such as storks, cranes, herons, gulls, skuas, penguins, and kingfishers, as well as many primarily insectivorous birds such as nightjars, frogmouths, and some passerines (e.g. shrikes); omnivorous passerine birds such as crows and ravens; and opportunistic predators from predominantly frugivorous or herbivorous ratites such as cassowaries and rheas. Some extinct predatory telluravian birds had talons similar to those of modern birds of prey, including mousebird relatives (Sandcoleidae), and Messelasturidae indicating possible common descent. Some Enantiornithes also had such talons, indicating possible convergent evolution, as enanthiornithines are not considered to be true modern birds.

== Common names ==
The term raptor is derived from the Latin word rapio, meaning "to seize or take by force". The common names for various birds of prey are based on structure, but many of the traditional names do not reflect the evolutionary relationships between the groups.

Variations in shape and size

- Eagles tend to be large, powerful birds with long, broad wings and massive feet. Booted eagles have legs and feet feathered to the toes and build very large stick nests.
- Falcons and kestrels are medium-size birds of prey with long pointed wings, and many are particularly swift flyers. They belong to the family Falconidae, only distantly related to the Accipitriformes below. Caracaras are a distinct subgroup of the Falconidae unique to the New World, and most common in the Neotropics – their broad wings, naked faces and appetites of a generalist suggest some level of convergence with either Buteo or the vulturine birds, or both.
- True hawks are medium-sized birds of prey that usually belong to the genus Accipiter (see below). They are mainly woodland birds that hunt by sudden dashes from a concealed perch. They usually have long tails for tight steering.
- Buzzards are medium-large raptors with robust bodies and broad wings, or, alternatively, any bird of the genus Buteo, also commonly known as "hawks" in North America, while "buzzard" is colloquially used for vultures.
- Harriers are large, slender hawk-like birds with long tails and long thin legs. Most use a combination of keen eyesight and hearing to hunt small vertebrates, gliding on their long broad wings and circling low over grasslands and marshes.
- Kites have long wings and relatively weak legs. They spend much of their time soaring. They will take live vertebrate prey, but mostly feed on insects or even carrion.
- The osprey, a single species found worldwide that specializes in catching fish and builds large stick nests.
- Owls are variable-sized, typically night-specialized hunting birds. They fly almost silently due to their special feather structure that reduces turbulence. They have particularly acute hearing and nocturnal eyesight.
- The secretary bird is a single species with a large body and long, stilted legs endemic to the open grasslands of Sub-Saharan Africa.
- Vultures are scavengers and carrion-eating raptors of two distinct biological families: the Old World vultures (Accipitridae), which occurs only in the Eastern Hemisphere; and the New World vultures, Cathartidae, which occurs only in the Western Hemisphere. Members of both groups have heads either partly or fully devoid of feathers.

Many of these group names originally referred to particular species encountered in Britain. As English‑speaking people travelled further, the familiar names were applied to new birds with similar characteristics. Names that have generalised in this way include: kite Milvus milvus; sparrowhawk or sparhawk Accipiter nisus; goshawk Accipiter gentilis; kestrel Falco tinnunculus; hobby Falco subbuteo; harrier (from "hen‑harrier") Circus cyaneus; and buzzard Buteo buteo.

Some names have not generalised and refer to single species or groups of closely related subspecies, such as the merlin, Falco columbarius.

== Systematics ==
=== Historical classifications ===
The taxonomy of Carl Linnaeus grouped birds (class Aves) into orders, genera, and species, with no formal ranks between genus and order. He placed all birds of prey into a single order, Accipitres, subdividing this into four genera: Vultur (vultures), Falco (eagles, hawks, falcons, etc.), Strix (owls), and Lanius (shrikes). This approach was followed by subsequent authors such as Gmelin, Latham and Turton.

Louis Pierre Vieillot used additional ranks: order, tribe, family, genus, species. Birds of prey (order Accipitres) were divided into diurnal and nocturnal tribes; the owls remained monogeneric (family Ægolii, genus Strix), whilst the diurnal raptors were divided into three families: Vulturini, Gypaëti, and Accipitrini. Thus Vieillot's families were similar to the Linnaean genera, with the difference that shrikes were no longer included amongst the birds of prey. In addition to the original Vultur and Falco (now reduced in scope), Vieillot adopted four genera from Savigny: Phene, Haliæetus, Pandion, and Elanus. He also introduced five new genera of vultures (Gypagus, Catharista, Daptrius, Ibycter, Polyborus) (Note: Vieillot included the caracaras (Daptrius, Ibycter, and Polyborus) in Vulturini, though it is now known that they are related to falcons.) and eleven new genera of accipitrines (Aquila, Circaëtus, Circus, Buteo, Milvus, Ictinia, Physeta, Harpia, Spizaëtus, Asturina, Sparvius).

Falconimorphae is a deprecated superorder within Raptores, formerly composed of the orders Falconiformes and Strigiformes. The clade was invalidated after 2012. Falconiformes is now placed in Eufalconimorphae, while Strigiformes is placed in Afroaves.

=== Modern systematics ===
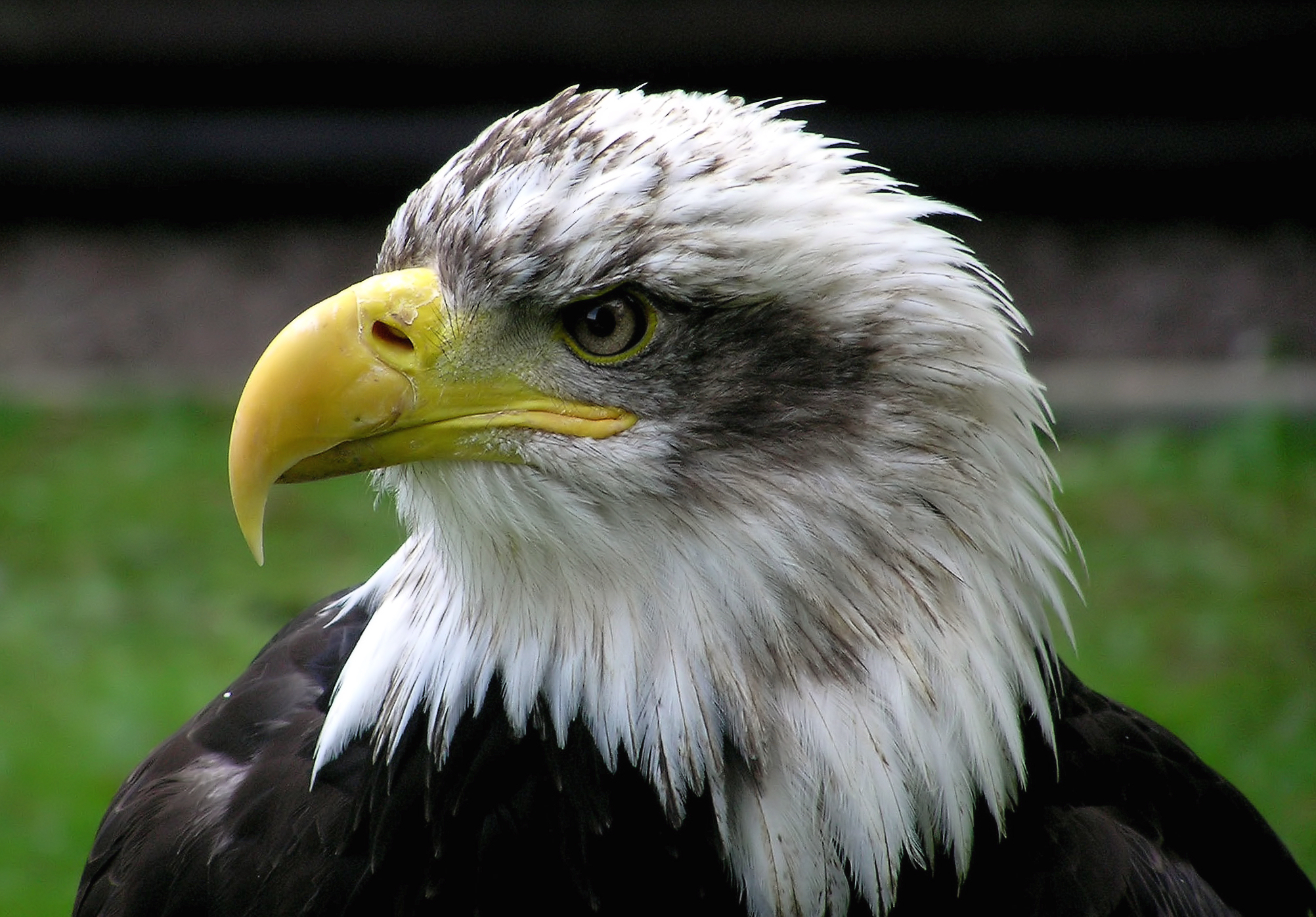
Bald eagle

The order Accipitriformes is believed to have originated about 44 million years ago, when the lineage leading to modern accipitrids diverged from that of the secretarybird (Sagittarius serpentarius) and the accipitrid species. The phylogeny of Accipitriformes is complex and difficult to unravel. Widespread paraphylies were observed in many phylogenetic studies. More recent and detailed studies show similar results. However, according to the findings of a 2014 study, the sister relationship between larger clades of Accipitriformes was well supported (e.g. relationship of Harpagus kites to buzzards and sea eagles and these latter two with Accipiter hawks are sister taxa of the clade containing Aquilinae and Harpiinae).

The diurnal birds of prey are formally classified into six families of two different orders (Accipitriformes and Falconiformes).

- Accipitridae: hawks, eagles, buzzards, harriers, kites, and Old World vultures
- Pandionidae: the osprey
- Sagittariidae: the secretarybird
- Falconidae: falcons, caracaras, and forest falcons
- Cathartidae: New World vultures, including condors

These families were traditionally grouped together in a single order Falconiformes but are now split into two orders, the Falconiformes and Accipitriformes. The Cathartidae are sometimes placed in a separate order Cathartiformes. Formerly, they were sometimes placed in the order Ciconiiformes.

The secretary bird and/or osprey are sometimes listed as subfamilies of Acciptridae: Sagittariinae and Pandioninae, respectively.

Australia's letter-winged kite is a member of the family Accipitridae, although it is a nocturnal bird.

The nocturnal birds of prey—the owls—are classified separately as members of two extant families of the order Strigiformes:

- Strigidae: "typical owls"
- Tytonidae: barn and bay owls

=== Phylogeny ===
Below is a simplified phylogeny of Telluraves which is the clade where the birds of prey belong to along with passerines and several near-passerine lineages. The orders in bold text are birds of prey orders; this is to show the paraphyly of the group as well as their relationships to other birds.

- Telluraves
  - Afroaves
    - **Accipitriformes** (hawks, vultures, and relatives)
    - - **Strigiformes** (owls)
      - Coraciimorphae (woodpeckers, rollers, hornbills, etc.)
  - Australaves
    - Cariamiformes (seriemas)
    - Eufalconimorphae
      - **Falconiformes** (falcons)
      - Psittacopasserae (parrots and songbirds)

A recent phylogenomic study from Wu et al. (2024) has found an alternative phylogeny for the placement of the birds of prey. Their analysis has found support in a clade consisting of the Strigiformes and Accipitriformes in new clade Hieraves. Hieraves was also recovered to be the sister clade to Australaves (which it includes the Cariamiformes and Falconiformes along with Psittacopasserae). Below is their phylogeny from the study.

- Telluraves
  - Coraciimorphae (woodpeckers, rollers, hornbills, etc.)
  - - Hieraves
      - - **Strigiformes** (owls)
        - - **Accipitriformes** (hawks, vultures, and relatives)
    - Australaves
      - - Cariamiformes (seriemas)
        - - Eufalconimorphae
            - **Falconiformes** (falcons)
            - Psittacopasserae (parrots and songbirds)

== Possible inclusion of Cariamiformes ==
Cariamiformes is an order of telluravian birds consisting of the living seriemas and extinct terror birds. Jarvis et al. 2014 suggested including them in the category of birds of prey, and McClure et al. 2019 considered seriemas to be birds of prey. The Peregrine Fund also considers seriemas to be birds of prey. Like most birds of prey, seriemas and terror birds prey on vertebrates.

However, seriemas were not traditionally considered birds of prey, and they are still not considered birds of prey in general parlance. They were traditionally classified in the order Gruiformes, but later research has reclassified them into Cariamiformes.

The bodies of seriemas are also shaped somewhat differently from birds of prey. Their legs and necks are significantly longer than those of typical raptors, although the secretarybirds (traditionally considered raptors) also have comparably long legs. The beaks of seriemas are hooked (as in raptors), but are longer than those of typical raptors.

== Migration ==
Migratory behaviour evolved multiple times within accipitrid raptors.

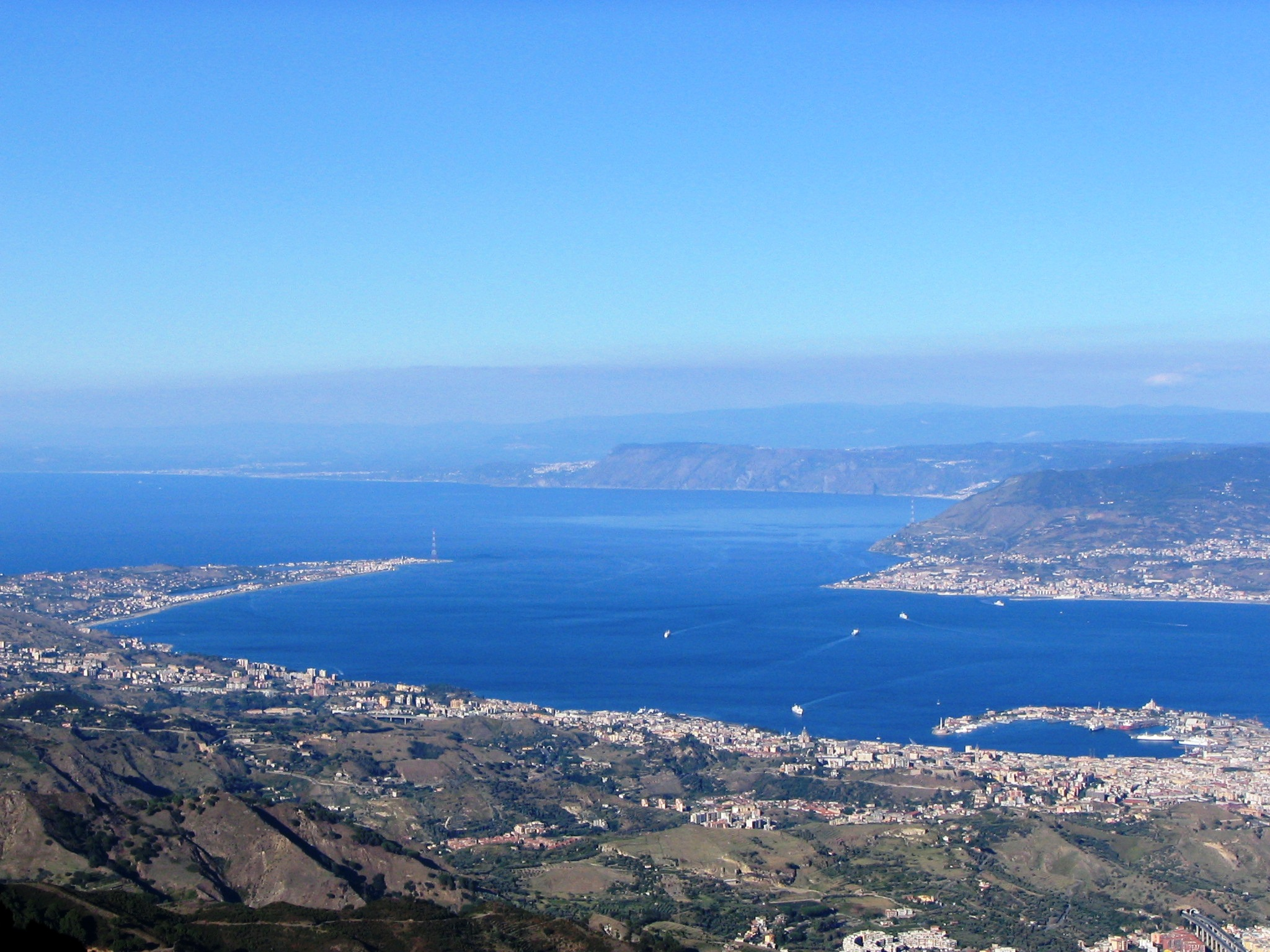
An obliged point of transit of the migration of the birds of prey is the bottleneck-shaped Strait of Messina, Sicily, here seen from Dinnammare mount, Peloritani.

The earliest event occurred nearly 14 to 12 million years ago. This result seems to be one of the oldest dates published so far in the case of birds of prey. For example, a previous reconstruction of migratory behaviour in one Buteo clade with a result of the origin of migration around 5 million years ago was also supported by that study.

Migratory species of raptors may have had a southern origin because it seems that all of the major lineages within Accipitridae had an origin in one of the biogeographic realms of the Southern Hemisphere. The appearance of migratory behaviour occurred in the tropics parallel with the range expansion of migratory species to temperate habitats. Similar results of southern origin in other taxonomic groups can be found in the literature.

Distribution and biogeographic history highly determine the origin of migration in birds of prey. Based on some comparative analyses, diet breadth also has an effect on the evolution of migratory behaviour in this group, but its relevance needs further investigation. The evolution of migration in animals seems to be a complex and difficult topic with many unanswered questions.

A recent study discovered new connections between migration and the ecology, life history of raptors. A brief overview from abstract of the published paper shows that "clutch size and hunting strategies have been proved to be the most important variables in shaping distribution areas, and also the geographic dissimilarities may mask important relationships between life history traits and migratory behaviours. The West Palearctic-Afrotropical and the North-South American migratory systems are fundamentally different from the East Palearctic-Indomalayan system, owing to the presence versus absence of ecological barriers." Maximum entropy modelling can help in answering the question: why species winters at one location while the others are elsewhere. Temperature and precipitation related factors differ in the limitation of species distributions. "This suggests that the migratory behaviours differ among the three main migratory routes for these species" which may have important conservational consequences in the protection of migratory raptors.

== Sexual dimorphism ==
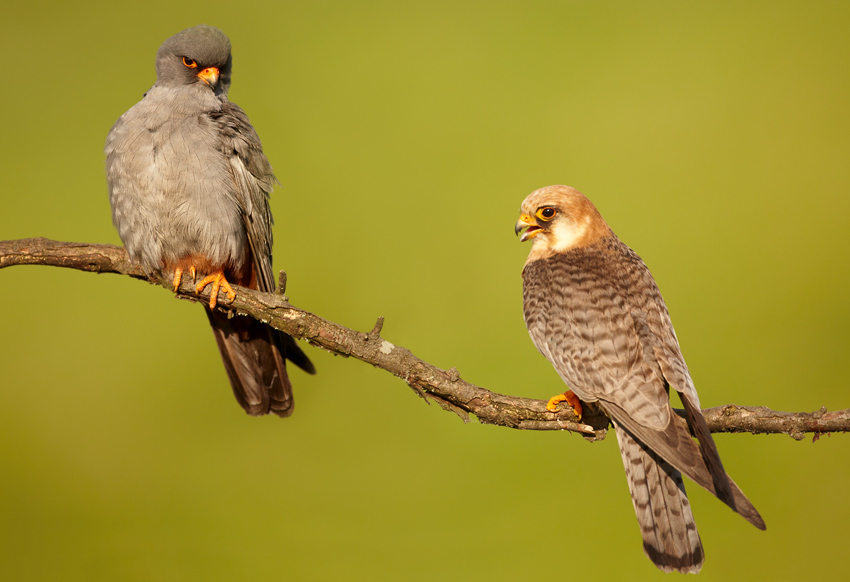
Male (left) and female (right) red-footed falcons

Birds of prey (raptors) are known to display patterns of sexual dimorphism. It is commonly believed that the dimorphisms found in raptors occur due to sexual selection or environmental factors. In general, hypotheses in favor of ecological factors being the cause for sexual dimorphism in raptors are rejected. This is because the ecological model is less parsimonious, meaning that its explanation is more complex than that of the sexual selection model. Additionally, ecological models are much harder to test because a great deal of data is required.

Dimorphisms can also be the product of intrasexual selection between males and females. It appears that both sexes of the species play a role in the sexual dimorphism within raptors; females tend to compete with other females to find good places to nest and attract males, and males competing with other males for adequate hunting ground so they appear as the most healthy mate. It has also been proposed that sexual dimorphism is merely the product of disruptive selection, and is merely a stepping stone in the process of speciation, especially if the traits that define gender are independent across a species. Sexual dimorphism can be viewed as something that can accelerate the rate of speciation.

In non-predatory birds, males are typically larger than females. However, in birds of prey, the opposite is the case. For instance, the kestrel is a type of falcon in which males are the primary providers, and the females are responsible for nurturing the young. In this species, the smaller the kestrels are, the less food is needed and thus, they can survive in environments that are harsher. This is particularly true in the male kestrels. It has become more energetically favorable for male kestrels to remain smaller than their female counterparts because smaller males have an agility advantage when it comes to defending the nest and hunting. Larger females are favored because they can incubate larger numbers of offspring, while also being able to brood a larger clutch size.

== Olfaction ==
It is a long-standing belief that birds lack any sense of smell, but it has become clear that many birds do have functional olfactory systems. Despite this, most raptors are still considered to primarily rely on vision, with raptor vision being extensively studied. A 2020 review of the existing literature combining anatomical, genetic, and behavioural studies showed that, in general, raptors have functional olfactory systems that they are likely to use in a range of different contexts.

== Persecution ==
Birds of prey have been historically persecuted both directly and indirectly. In the Danish Faroe Islands, there were rewards Naebbetold (by royal decree from 1741) given in return for the bills of birds of prey shown by hunters. In Britain, kites and buzzards were seen as destroyers of game and killed, for instance in 1684–5 alone as many as 100 kites were killed. Rewards for their killing were also in force in the Netherlands from 1756. From 1705 to 1800, it has been estimated that 624,087 birds of prey were killed in a part of Germany that included Hannover, Luneburg, Lauenburg and Bremen with 14,125 claws deposited just in 1796–97. Many species also develop lead poisoning after accidental consumption of lead shot when feeding on animals that had been shot by hunters. Lead pellets from direct shooting that the birds have escaped from also cause reduced fitness and premature deaths.

== Attacks on humans ==
Some evidence supports the contention that the African crowned eagle occasionally views human children as prey, with a witness account of one attack (in which the victim, a seven-year-old boy, survived and the eagle was killed), and the discovery of part of a human child skull in a nest. This would make it the only living bird known to prey on humans, although other birds such as ostriches and cassowaries have killed humans in self-defense and a lammergeier might have killed Aeschylus by accident. Many stories of Brazilian indigenous peoples speak about children mauled by Uiruuetê, the Harpy Eagle in Tupi language. Various large raptors like golden eagles are reported attacking human beings, but its unclear if they intend to eat them or if they have ever been successful in killing one.

Some fossil evidence indicates large birds of prey occasionally preyed on prehistoric hominids. The Taung Child, an early human found in Africa, is believed to have been killed by an eagle-like bird similar to the crowned eagle. The Haast's eagle may have preyed on early humans in New Zealand, and this conclusion would be consistent with Maori folklore. Leptoptilos robustus might have preyed on both Homo floresiensis and anatomically modern humans, and the Malagasy crowned eagle, teratorns, Woodward's eagle and Caracara major are similar in size to the Haast's eagle, implying that they similarly could pose a threat to a human being.

== Vision ==
Birds of prey have exceptionally good vision and rely heavily on it for a number of tasks. They utilize their high visual acuity to obtain food, navigate their surroundings, distinguish and flee from predators, mating, nest construction, and much more. They accomplish these tasks with a large eye in relation to their skull, which allows for a larger image to be projected onto the retina. The visual acuity of some large raptors such as eagles and Old World vultures are the highest known among vertebrates; the wedge-tailed eagle has twice the visual acuity of a typical human and six times that of the common ostrich, which possess the largest eyes of any terrestrial animal.

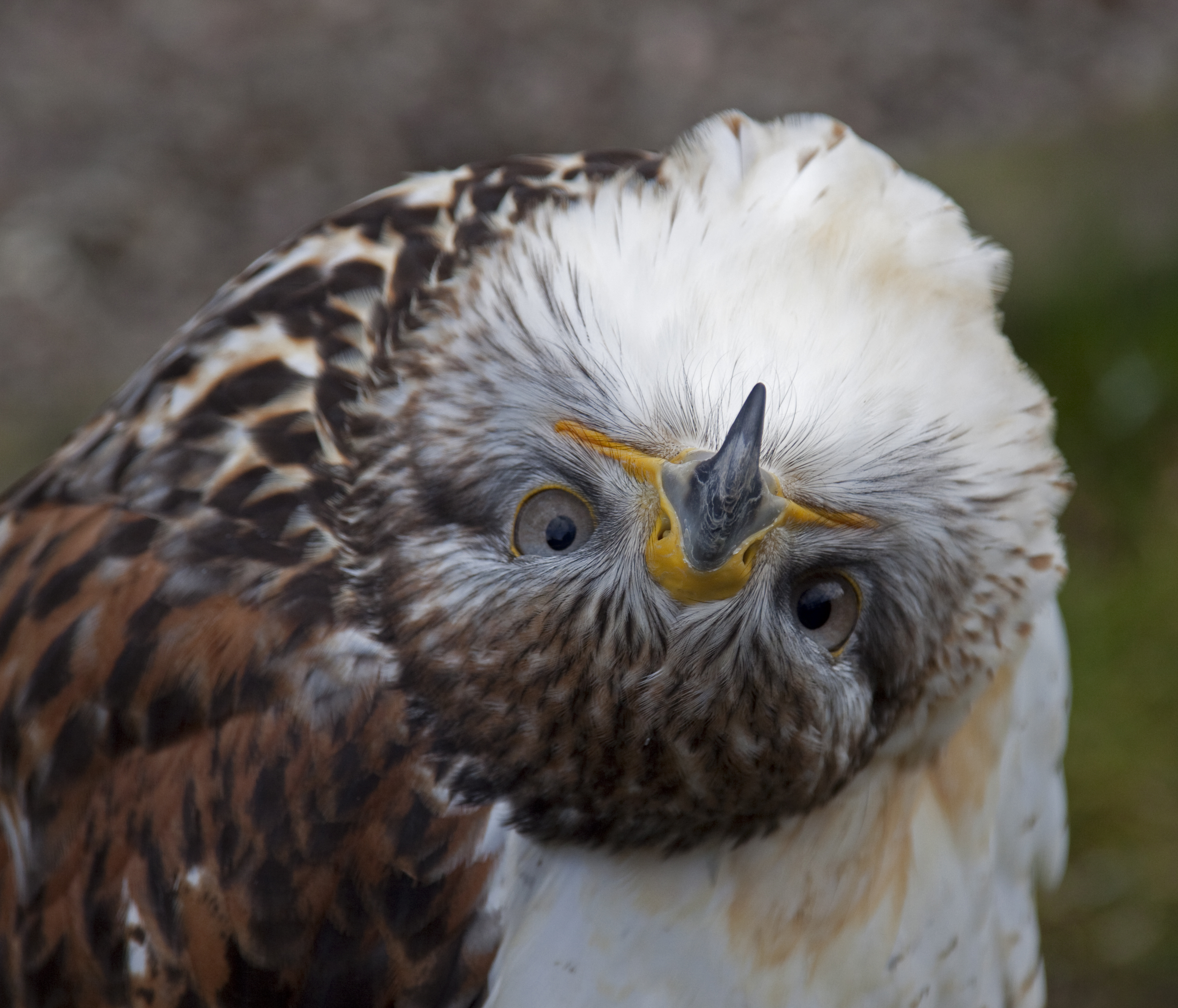
Ferruginous hawk tilting its head

There are two regions in the retina, called the deep and shallow fovea, that are specialized for acute vision. These regions contain the highest density of photoreceptors, and provide the highest points of visual acuity. The deep fovea points forward at an approximate 45° angle, while the shallow fovea points approximately 15° to the right or left of the head axis. Several raptor species repeatedly cock their heads into three distinct positions while observing an object. First, is straight ahead with their head pointed towards the object. Second and third are sideways to the right or left of the object, with their head axis positioned approximately 40° adjacent to the object. This movement is believed to be associated with lining up the incoming image to fall on the deep fovea. Raptors will choose which head position to use depending on the distance to the object. At distances as close as 8m, they used primarily binocular vision. At distances greater than 21 m (69 ft), they spent more time using monocular vision. At distances greater than 40 m (130 ft), they spent 80% or more time using their monocular vision. This suggests that raptors tilt their head to rely on the highly acute deep fovea.

Like all birds, raptors possess tetrachromacy, however, due to their emphasis on visual acuity, many diurnal birds of prey have little ability to see ultraviolet light as this produces chromatic aberration which decreases the clarity of vision.

== Cultural significance ==
Birds of prey often hold symbolic or cultural significance in human societies.

== See also ==
- Origin of birds
