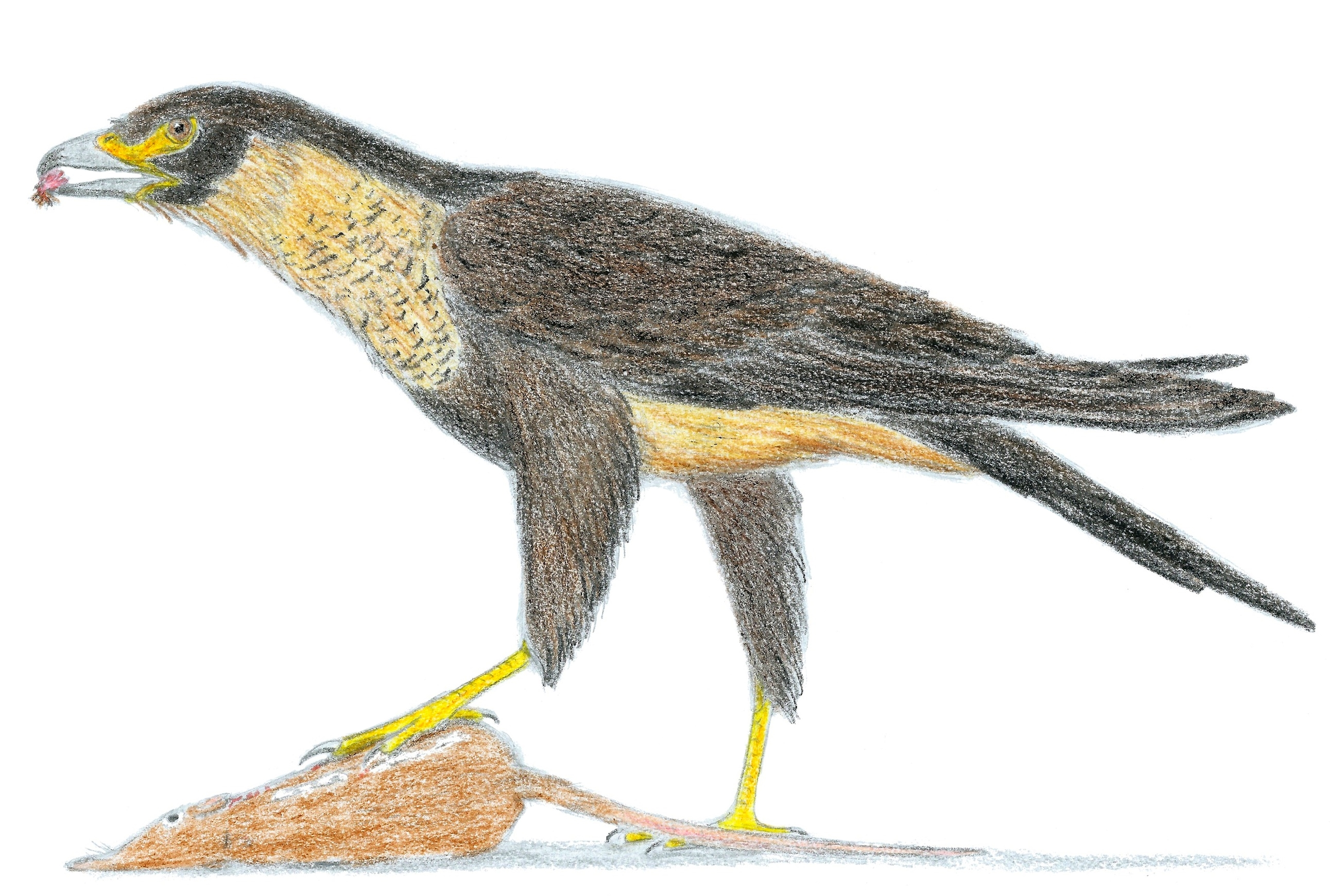
- Speculative life restoration of M. parvunguis based on modern falconiforms

Scientific classification
- Kingdom: Animalia
- Phylum: Chordata
- Class: Aves
- Order: Falconiformes
- Family: †Masillaraptoridae
- Genus: †Masillaraptor; Mayr, 2006

Type species
- †Masillaraptor parvunguis Mayr, 2006

Other species
- †Masillaraptor buchheimi Li et al., 2025

= Masillaraptor =

Masillaraptor Temporal range: Middle Eocene

Extinct genus of falcons

Masillaraptor is an extinct genus of masillaraptorid falconiforms. It is a long-legged relative of the living falcons. The genus contains two species: M. parvunguis, named in 2006 from the Messel pit (Middle Eocene) of Germany, and M. buchheimi, named in 2025 from the Green River Formation (Early Eocene) of Wyoming, United States.

== Discovery and naming ==
There are two known specimens of Masillaraptor parvunguis, discovered in the Messel pit, an old shale mine known for the exceptional preservation of fossils that have been discovered there. Both are preserved on a slab of rock, comprising nearly complete and articulated skeletons. The specimens are both believed to be adult members of the species. The holotype specimen is SMF-ME 1065. The second specimen, SMF-ME 11042, is one slab of a part and counterpart, formerly held in a private collection. The counterslab remains privately owned, and its whereabouts are unknown.

The genus name Masillaraptor comes from the Latin word Masilla, which is the old name for the town of Messel, and raptor is a New Latin suffix used to indicate a predator (from rapere, to catch), and in English refers to birds of prey. The specific epithet parvunguis is also Latin, coming from the word parvus which means small and feeble, while unguis means claw. The name refers to the fact that the specimen's claws are small in comparison to those of other raptors.

A second Masillaraptor species, M. buchheimi, was named in 2025 based on two specimens collected from the Green River Formation of Wyoming, United States. The holotype, FOBU 9510, includes the skull, part of the neck, and part of the hindlimb. The referred specimen, FMNH PA 777, is a negative mold of a skull. The specific epithet of this species honors H. Paul Buchheim, a geologist associated with Fossil Butte National Monument, where the holotype of the species is housed.

== Characteristics ==
The genus Masillaraptor is different from all other known avian taxa. It possesses a combination of characters that distinguishes it from all others.

1. The beak is almost as long as the cranium itself, with equal height over much of its length and a straight dorsal ridge. The beak curves just before its tip, restricting the nasal openings to the rear half of the beak.
2. The tibiotarsus is the longest bone in the leg.
3. On the second toe the first phalanx is shortened, whereas on the fourth toe the second and third phalanges are shortened.
4. The claws of Masillaraptor are small and weak compared to other falconiform birds with abbreviated pedal phalanges.

Characters (1) and (3) are derived within neornithine birds and also found in modern Accipitres, from which Masillaraptor is, however, distinguished in character (4).

== Classification ==
Alongside Danielsraptor, Masillaraptor represents one of two members of the Masillaraptoridae within the Falconiformes. The cladogram below displays the results of the phylogenetic analysis by Mayr & Kitchener (2022):

- - Chauna torquata (southern screamer)
  - Australaves
    - Falconiformes
      - Caracara plancus (crested caracara)
      - Masillaraptoridae
        - Masillaraptor parvunguis
        - Danielsraptor phorusrhacoides
    - Cariamiformes
      - Bathornis spp.
      - Dynamopterus spp.
      - - Cariama cristata (red-legged seriema)
        - Phorusrhacidae (terror birds)
          - Llallawavis scagliai
          - Psilopterus lemoinei
          - Patagornis marshi
