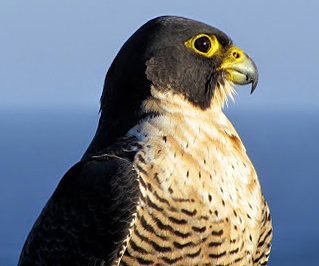
- Peregrine falcon (Falco peregrinus)

Scientific classification
- Kingdom: Animalia
- Phylum: Chordata
- Class: Aves
- Clade: Eufalconimorphae
- Order: Falconiformes; Sharpe, 1874

Subtaxa
- †Antarctoboenus ?†Parvulivenator ?†Stintonornis †Masillaraptoridae; Falconidae

= Falconiformes =

Falcons and caracaras Temporal range: Early Eocene – Holocene, 55–0 Ma

Order of birds

The order Falconiformes (/fælˈkɒnɪˌfɔːrmiːz/) is represented by the extant family Falconidae (falcons and caracaras) and a handful of enigmatic Paleogene species. Traditionally, most other diurnal bird of prey families Cathartidae (New World vultures and condors), Sagittariidae (secretarybird), Pandionidae (ospreys), and Accipitridae (hawks) were classified in Falconiformes. A variety of comparative genome analyses published since 2008, however, found that falcons are part of a clade of birds called Australaves, which also includes seriemas, parrots and passerines. Within Australaves falcons are more closely related to the parrot-passerine clade than they are to the seriemas. The hawks, vultures and owls are placed in the clade Afroaves.

The cladogram of the Telluraves shown below is based on the study by Josefin Stiller and collaborators published in 2024. The species numbers are taken from the December 2023 version of the list maintained by Frank Gill, Pamela C. Rasmussen and David Donsker on behalf of the International Ornithological Committee (IOC). This list includes the Cathartiformes (New World vultures) in the order Accipitriformes.

- Telluraves
  - Afroaves
    - - Strigiformes (owls – 254 species)
      - - Cathartiformes (New World vultures – 7 species)
        - Accipitriformes (hawks, osprey and secretarybird – 258 species)
    - - Coliiformes (mouse birds – 6 species)
      - - Leptosomiformes (cuckoo roller – 1 species)
        - - Trogoniformes (trogons and quetzals – 46 species)
          - - Bucerotiformes (hornbills and relatives – 77 species)
            - - Coraciiformes (kingfishers and relatives – 186 species)
              - Piciformes (woodpeckers and relatives – 448 species)
  - Australaves
    - Cariamiformes (seriemas – 2 species)
    - - Falconiformes (falcons – 65 species)
      - - Psittaciformes (parrots – 408 species)
        - Passeriformes (passerines – 6,719 species)

== Fossil record ==
The fossil record of Falconiformes sensu stricto is poorly documented. The only stem-falcons that have mostly complete remains are Masillaraptor parvunguis and Danielsraptor phorusrhacoides, while the other taxa Stintonornis mitchelli and Parvulivenator watteli are known from fragmentary remains. Mayr (2009) noted the similarity of Masillaraptor to the seriemas. One study from Wang et al. (2012) using 30 nuclear loci from 28 taxa found Falconidae and Cariamidae being sister taxa to each other. This has, however, not been supported by the latest major neoavian phylogenetic studies. A 2022 study recovers masillaraptorids as true falcons.
