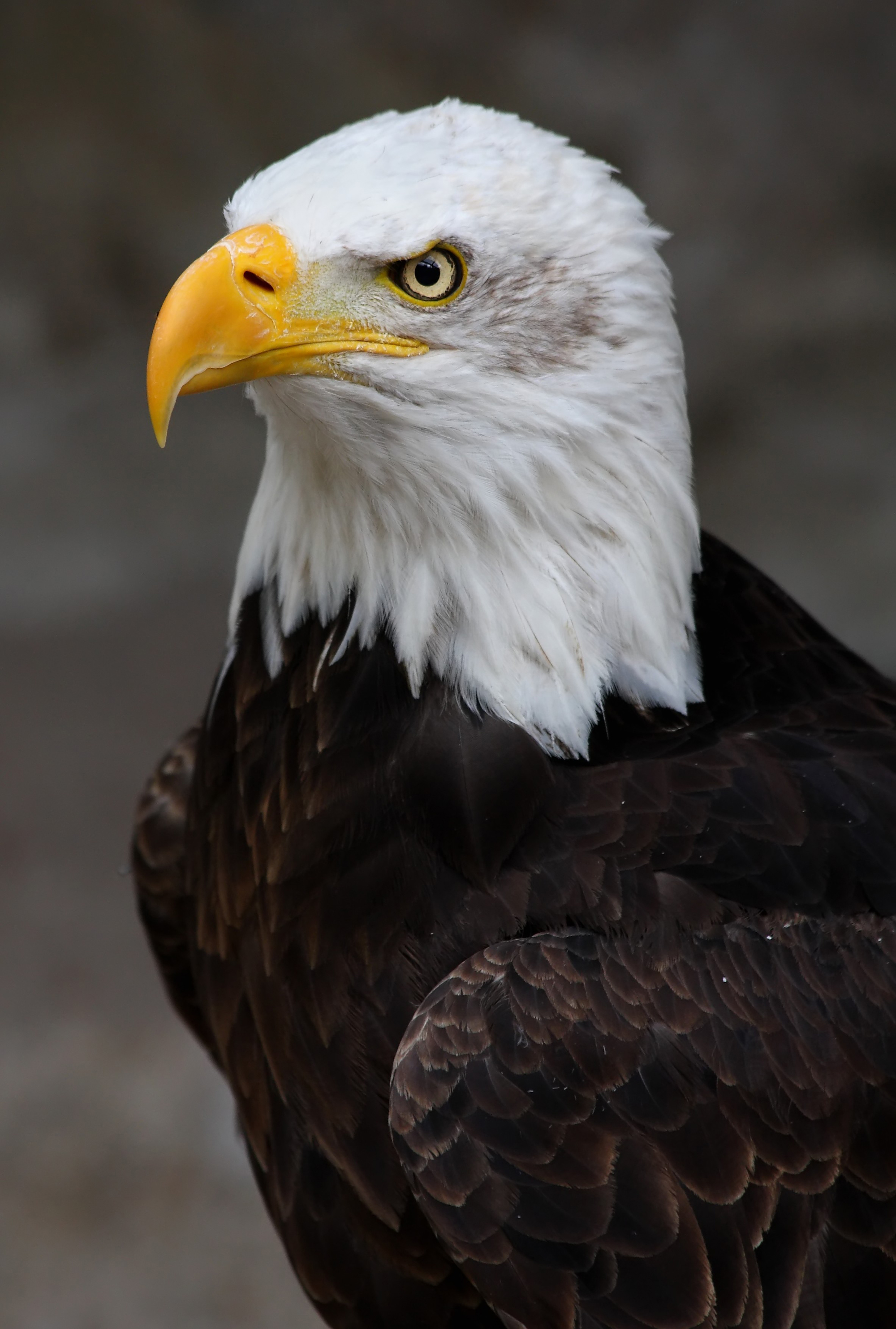
- Bald eagle (Haliaeetus leucocephalus)
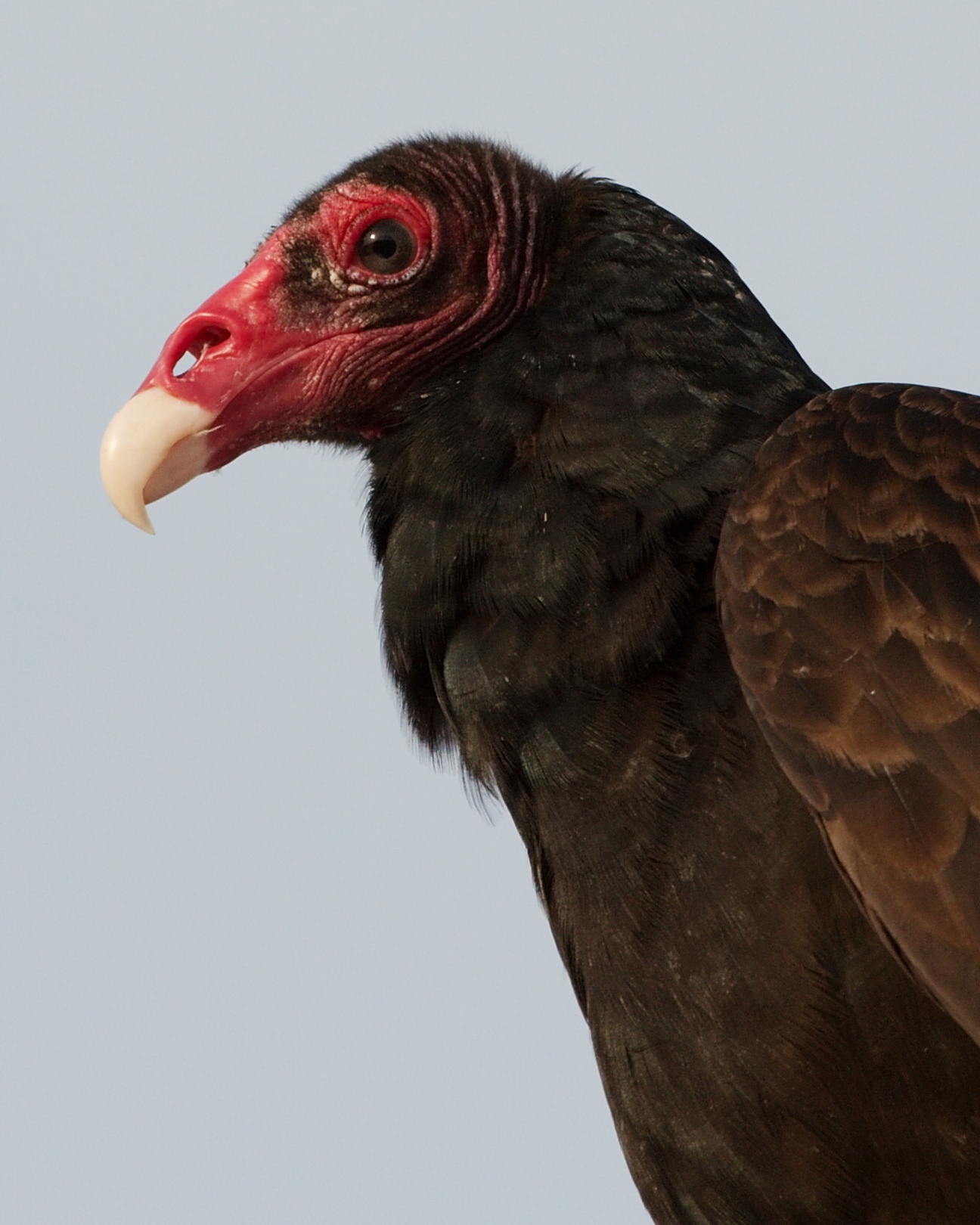
- Turkey vulture (Cathartes aura)

Scientific classification
- Kingdom: Animalia
- Phylum: Chordata
- Class: Aves
- Clade: Telluraves
- Clade: Accipitrimorphae; Vieillot, 1816

Orders
- Cathartiformes; Accipitriformes

= Accipitrimorphae =

Accipitrimorphae Temporal range: Eocene-Present, 50–0 Ma

Clade of birds

Accipitrimorphae is a clade of birds of prey that includes the orders Cathartiformes (New World vultures) and Accipitriformes (diurnal birds of prey such as eagles, hawks, osprey and secretarybird). Accipitrimorphae belongs to the clade Telluraves. Historically, some authorities included the New World vultures in the Accipitriformes, but recognition of Cathartiformes as a separate order subsequently became more widespread.

The phylogenetic placement of New World vultures was long debated. Based in part on DNA–DNA hybridization studies, Sibley and Ahlquist (1990) supported a close relationship between New World vultures and storks (Ciconiidae). Subsequent high-quality molecular phylogenetic studies completely refuted the stork-vulture relationship, instead recovering them as a sister group to the order Accipitriformes. Catanach et al. (2024) discovered that the two groups diverged 61.3 million years ago.

Cladogram based on Jarvis et al. (2014).

- Accipitrimorphae
  - Cathartiformes
    Cathartidae (New World vultures)
  - Accipitriformes
    - Sagittariidae (Secretarybird)
    - - Pandionidae (Osprey)
      - Accipitridae (Hawks, eagles, kites, Old World vultures etc.)

== Notes ==
=== Sources ===
- Chesser, R. Terry; Banks, Richard C.; Barker, F. Keith; Cicero, Carla; Dunn, Jon L.; Kratter, Andrew W.; Lovette, Irby J.; Rasmussen, Pamela C.; Remsen Jr., J. V.; Rising, James D.; Stotz, Douglas F. & Winker, Kevin (July 2010). "Fifty-First Supplement to the American Ornithologists' Union Check-list of North American Birds". The Auk. 127 (3): 726–744. doi:10.1525/auk.2010.127.3.726. S2CID 86363169.
- Remsen, J. V. Jr.; Areta, J. I.; Bonaccorso, E.; Claramunt, S.; Jaramillo, A.; Lane, D. F.; Pacheco, J. F.; Robbins, M. B.; Stiles, F. G. & Zimmer, K. J. (7 January 2021). "A classification of the bird species of South America, version 7". American Ornithological Society.
