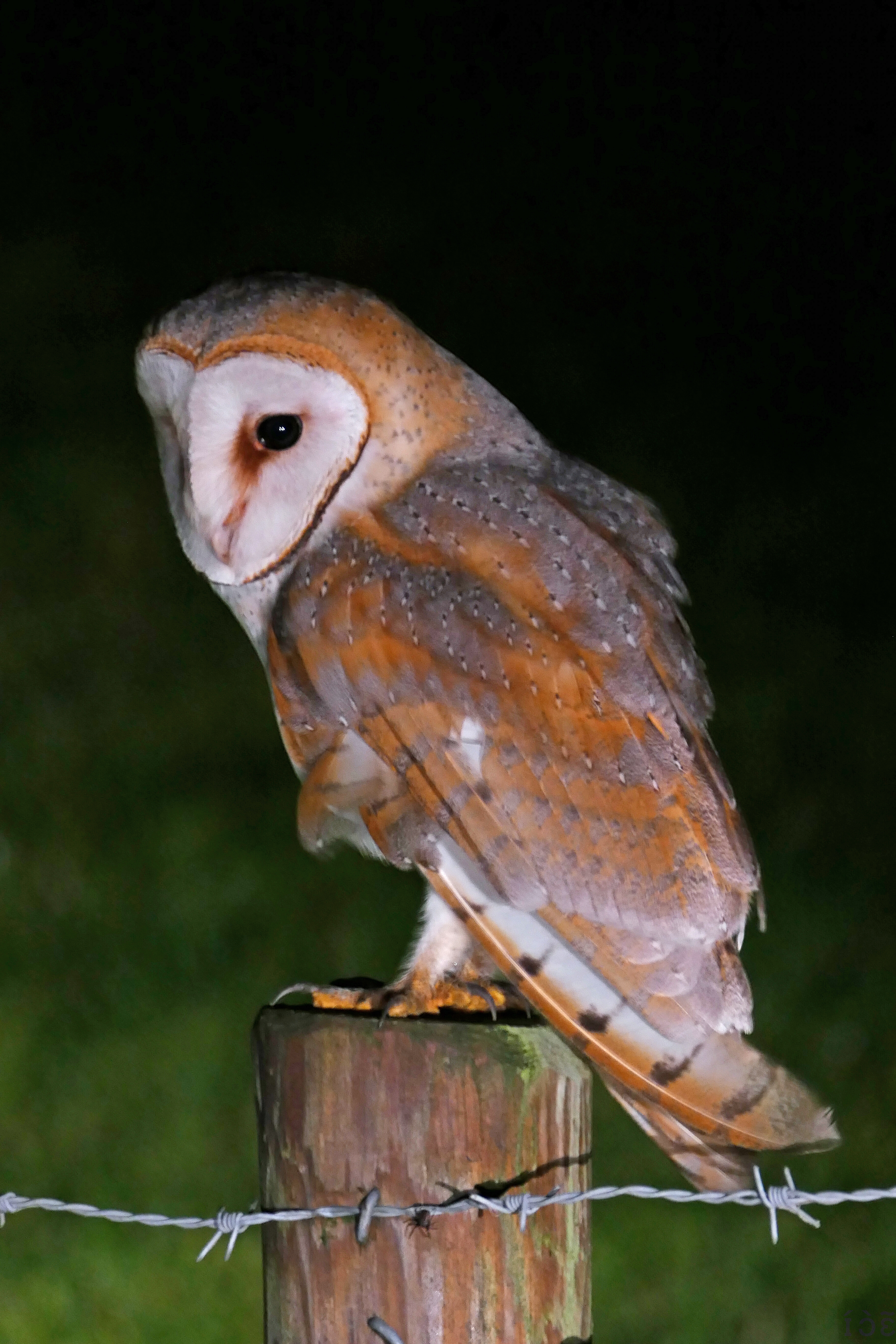
- Barn owl Tyto alba
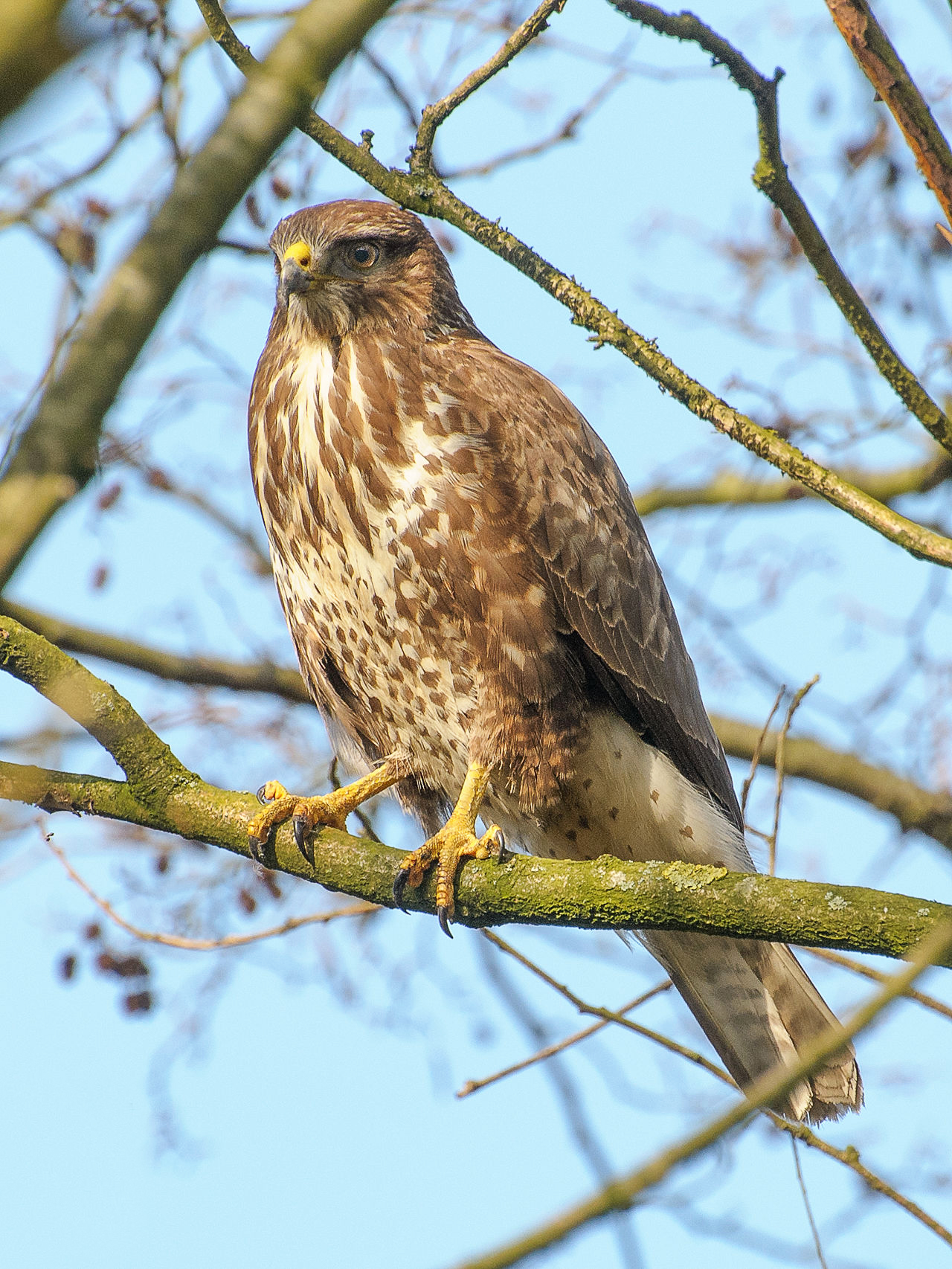
- Common buzzard Buteo buteo

Scientific classification
- Kingdom: Animalia
- Phylum: Chordata
- Class: Aves
- Clade: Telluraves
- Clade: Hieraves; Wu et al., 2024

Clades
- Strigiformes; Accipitriformes

= Hieraves =

Hieraves Temporal range: Paleocene (Danian) to recent 61.7–0 Ma Possible Late Cretaceous origin based on molecular clock

Clade of birds

Hieraves is a clade of telluravian birds named by Wu et al. (2024) that includes the orders Strigiformes (owls) and Accipitriformes (hawks and their relatives). The Cathartidae (New World vultures) are usually included in Accipitriformes, but some authors treat them as a third order Cathartiformes in the Hieraves. In the past, either owls, New World vultures, and hawks were found to be basal outgroups with respect to Coraciimorphae inside Afroaves, or Accipitriformes and Cathartiformes were recovered as a basal clade in respect to the rest of the members of Telluraves. Houde et al. (2019) found support for Hieraves (then unnamed), but they were found to be the sister group to Coraciimorphae and Australaves. The analysis of Wu et al. (2024) has found Hieraves to be the sister clade to Australaves. Stiller et al. (2024) found Hieraves to be basal to Afroaves.
