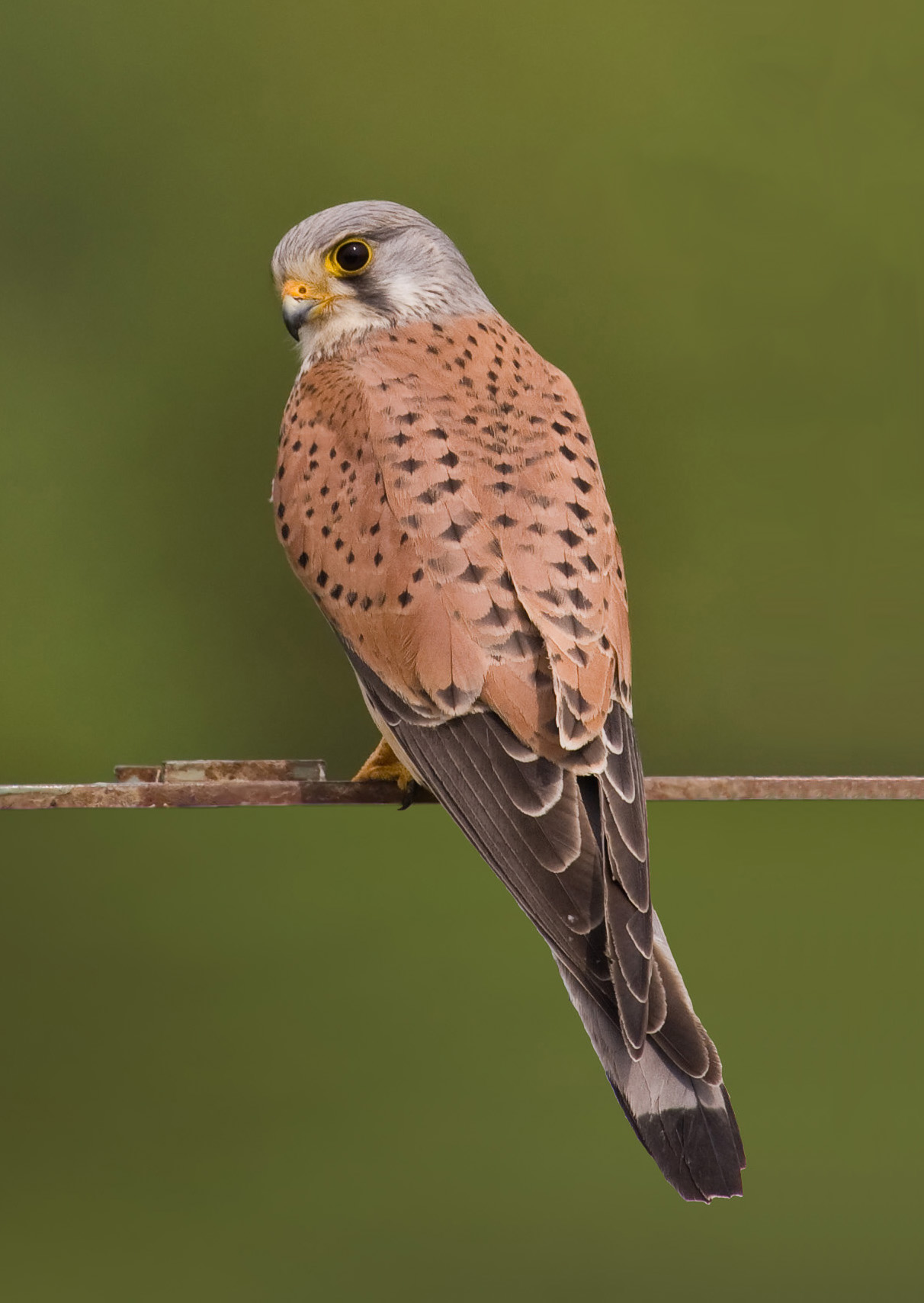
- Common kestrel, Falco tinnunculus

Scientific classification
- Kingdom: Animalia
- Phylum: Chordata
- Class: Aves
- Clade: Australaves
- Clade: Eufalconimorphae; Suh et al., 2011

Subclades
- Falconiformes; Psittacopasserae

= Eufalconimorphae =

Eufalconimorphae Temporal range: Early Eocene - Holocene, 54–0 Ma Possibly an earlier origin based on molecular clock

Clade of birds

Eufalconimorphae is a clade of birds, consisting of passerines, parrots, falcons, caracaras, and forest falcons (but not other raptors). It has whole-genome DNA support. This clade was defined in the PhyloCode by George Sangster and colleagues in 2022 as "the least inclusive crown clade containing Falco subbuteo and Passer domesticus". Eufalconimorphae birds are characterized by their strong and hooked beaks, sharp talons, and powerful wings. They have excellent eyesight, which allows them to spot their prey from great distances. The Eufalconimorphae is noted to produce aerodynamic force during the upstroke of flight to help create a vertical flight pattern.

See below cladogram showing Eufalconimorphae's relationship within Australaves:

- Australaves
  - Cariamiformes (seriemas)
  - Eufalconimorphae
    - Falconiformes (falcons)
    - - †Messelasturithiformes
      - Psittacopasserae
        - Psittaciformes (parrots)
        - Passeriformes (songbirds)
