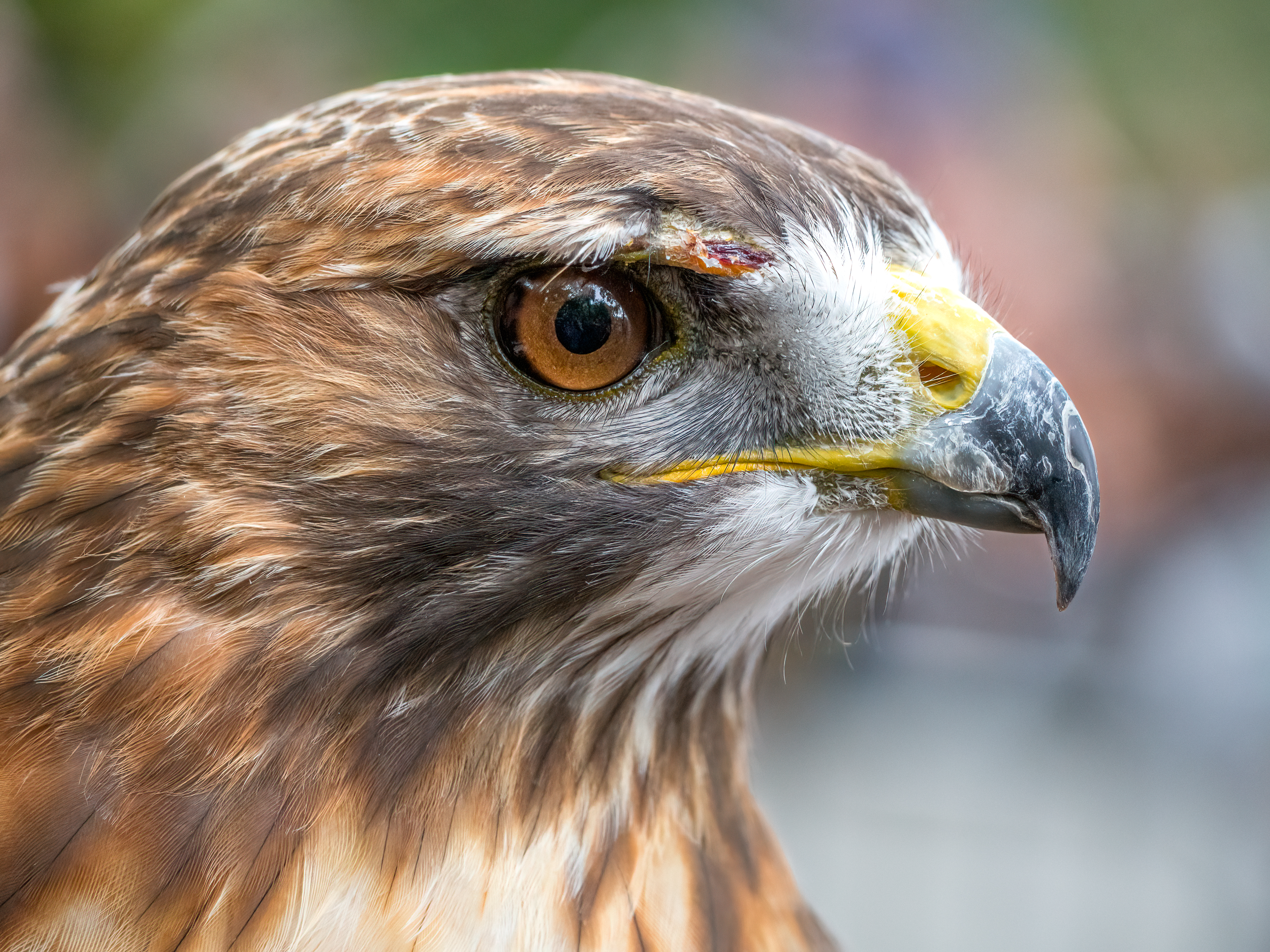
- Red-tailed hawk (Buteo jamaicensis)
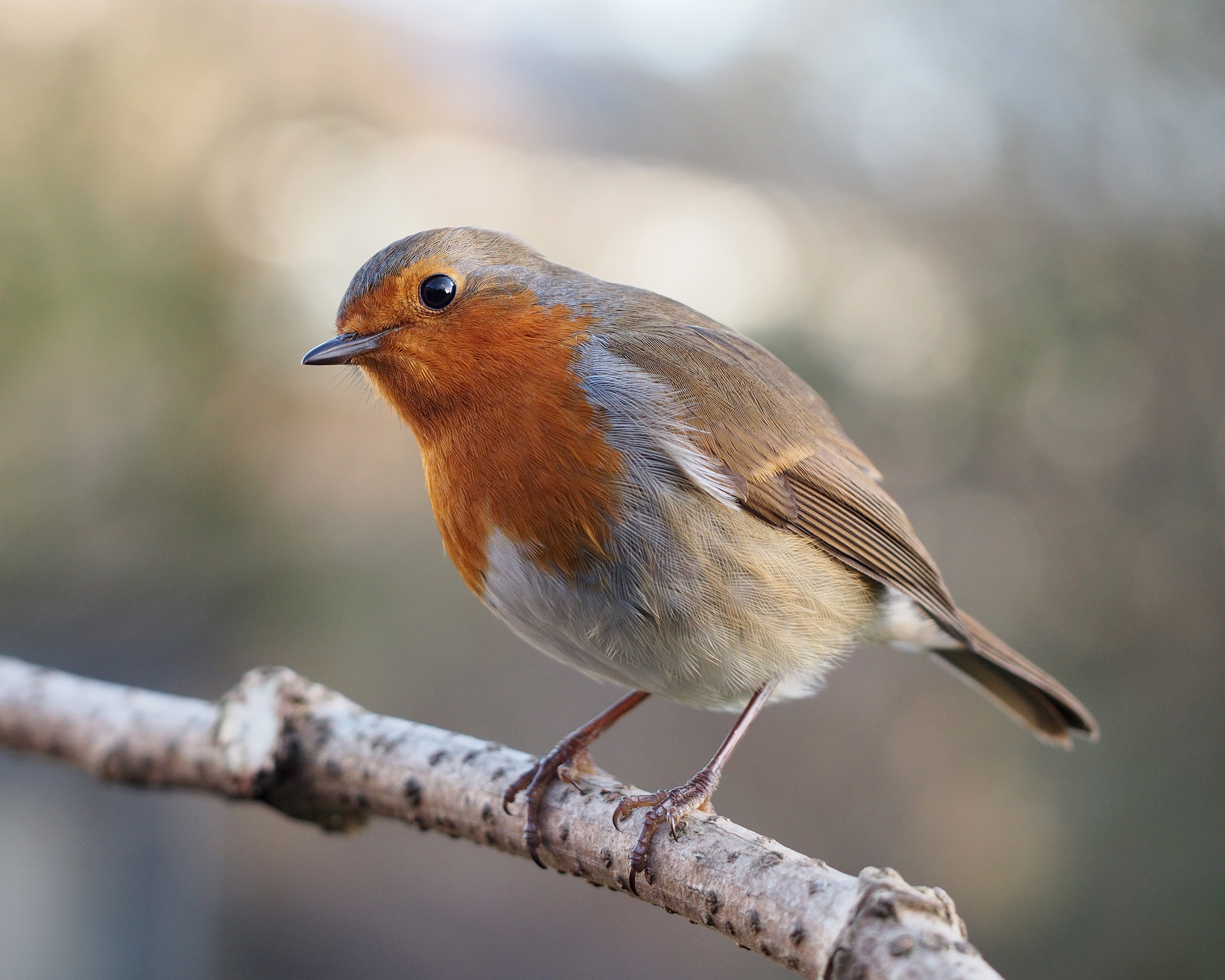
- European robin (Erithacus rubecula)

Scientific classification
- Kingdom: Animalia
- Phylum: Chordata
- Class: Aves
- Clade: Neoaves
- Clade: Passerea
- Clade: Telluraves; Yuri et al., 2013

Clades
- Australaves; Afroaves

= Telluraves =

Telluraves Temporal range: Paleocene - Recent, 62.5–0 Ma

Clade of birds

Telluraves, also known as land birds or core landbirds, is a recently defined clade of birds defined by their arboreality. Based on most recent genetic studies, the clade unites a variety of bird groups, including the australavians (passerines, parrots, seriemas, and falcons) as well as the afroavians (including the Accipitrimorphae – eagles, hawks, buzzards, vultures etc. – owls and woodpeckers, among others). This grouping was defined in the PhyloCode by George Sangster and colleagues in 2022 as "the least inclusive crown clade containing Accipiter nisus and Passer domesticus". They appear to be the sister group of the Phaethoquornithes.

Based on phylogenetic relationships among lineages of the Afroaves and the Australaves, it has been suggested that the last common ancestor of all Telluraves may have been an apex predator, and possibly also a bird of prey. Other researchers are skeptical of this assessment, citing the herbivorous cariamiform Strigogyps as evidence to the contrary.

Afroaves has not always been recovered as a monophyletic clade in modern molecular phylogenetic studies. For instance, Prum et al. (2015) recovered the accipitrimorphs as the sister group to a clade (Eutelluraves) comprising the remaining Afroavian orders and Australaves, while an analysis by Houde et al. (2019) recovered a clade of accipitrimorphs and owls as sister to the remaining landbirds. Wu et al. (2024) also found recovered and found support the clade of accipitrimorphs and owls (which they have named Hieraves), but found the clade to be sister to Australaves, while Coraciimorphae is the sister lineage to all other Telluraves.

The cladogram of the Telluraves shown below is based on the study by Josefin Stiller and collaborators published in 2024. The species numbers are taken from the December 2023 version of the list maintained by Frank Gill, Pamela C. Rasmussen and David Donsker on behalf of the International Ornithological Committee (IOC). This list includes the Cathartiformes (New World vultures) in the order Accipitriformes.

- Telluraves
  - Afroaves
    - Hieraves
      - Strigiformes (owls – 254 species)
      - Accipitriformes (vultures, hawks, eagles and relatives – 264 species)
    - Coraciimorphae
      - Coliiformes (mousebirds – 6 species)
      - Cavitaves
        - Leptosomiformes (cuckoo roller – 1 species)
        - Eucavitaves
          - Trogoniformes (trogons and quetzals – 46 species)
          - Picocoraciae
            - Bucerotiformes (hornbills and relatives – 77 species)
            - Picodynastornithes
              - Coraciiformes (kingfishers and relatives – 186 species)
              - Piciformes (woodpeckers and relatives – 448 species)
  - Australaves
    - Cariamiformes (seriemas – 2 species)
    - Eufalconimorphae
      - Falconiformes (falcons – 65 species)
      - Psittacopasseres
        - Psittaciformes (parrots – 408 species)
        - Passeriformes (passerines – 6,719 species)
