= Dynamopterus =

Dynamopterus Temporal range: Oligocene

Scientific classification
- Kingdom: Animalia
- Phylum: Chordata
- Class: Aves
- Order: Cuculiformes
- Family: Cuculidae
- Genus: †Dynamopterus; Milne-Edwards, 1892
- Species: †D. velox

Binomial name
- †Dynamopterus velox Milne-Edwards, 1892

Synonyms
- ?Idiornis Oberholser, 1899

Extinct species of bird

Dynamopterus velox is an extinct prehistoric bird, known from a single large right humerus recovered in France. The humerus shares anatomical features with living cuckoos (though it is much larger). It has also been classified in the suborder Cariamae in the Gruiformes. Some fossils once thought to be Dynamopterus tuberculatus may actually belong to Perplexicervicidae, a newly identified group of birds with bumpy neck bones that might have helped protect them from predators.
