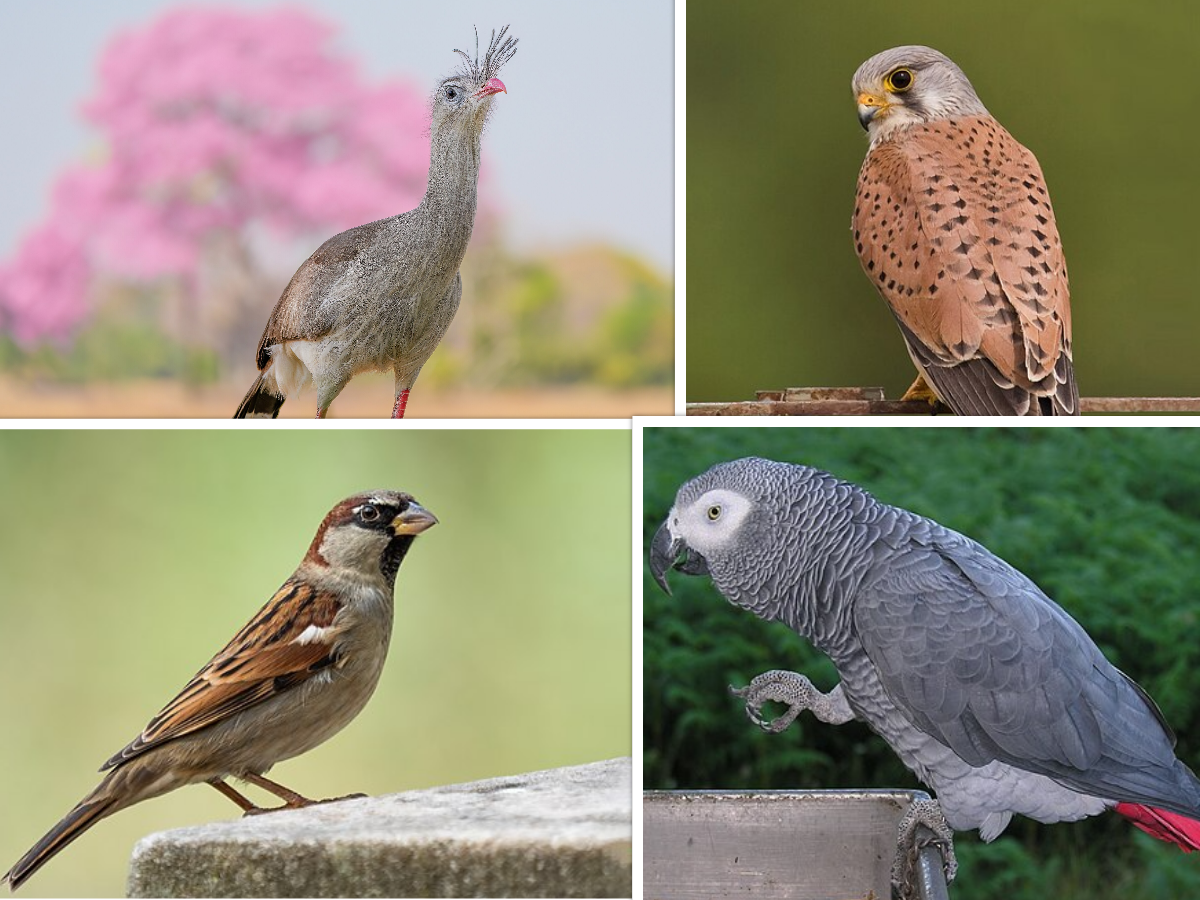
- A representative of each of the four main clades of Australaves: the red-legged seriema (Cariamiformes), common kestrel (Falconiformes), house sparrow (Passeriformes), and African grey parrot (Psittaciformes).

Scientific classification
- Kingdom: Animalia
- Phylum: Chordata
- Class: Aves
- Clade: Telluraves
- Clade: Australaves; Ericson, 2012

Clades
- Cariamiformes; Eufalconimorphae

= Australaves =

Australaves Temporal range: Early Eocene - Holocene, 54–0 Ma Possibly an earlier origin based on molecular clock

Clade of birds

Australaves is a clade of birds defined in 2012, consisting of the Eufalconimorphae (passerines, parrots and falcons) as well as the Cariamiformes (including seriemas and the extinct "terror birds"). They appear to be the sister group of Afroaves. This clade was defined in the PhyloCode by George Sangster and colleagues in 2022 as "the least inclusive crown clade containing Cariama cristata and Passer domesticus".

== Location ==
The clade's name, meaning 'southern birds', reflects the group's evolutionary origins in the Southern Hemisphere: passerines and parrots in Australia, and falcons and seriemas in South America.

As in the case of Afroaves, the most basal clades have predatory extant members, suggesting this was the ancestral lifestyle; however, some researchers like Darren Naish are skeptical of this assessment, since some extinct representatives such as the herbivorous Strigogyps led other lifestyles. Basal parrots and falcons are at any rate vaguely crow-like and probably omnivorous.

== Phylogeny ==
- Australaves
  - Cariamiformes (seriemas)
  - Eufalconimorphae
    - Falconiformes (falcons)
    - Psittacopasserae
      - Psittaciformes (parrots)
      - Passeriformes (songbirds)

Cladogram of Telluraves relationships based on Kuhl et al. (2020) and Braun & Kimball (2021)
