= Boutersemia =

Boutersemia Temporal range: upper Paleogene (early Oligocene; MP 21), ~33 Ma

Scientific classification
- Kingdom: Animalia
- Phylum: Chordata
- Class: Aves
- Order: Charadriiformes
- Family: incertae sedis
- Genus: †Boutersemia; Mayr & Smith, 2001

Type species
- †Boutersemia belgica Mayr & Smith, 2001

Other species
- †Boutersemia parvula Mayr & Smith, 2001

Extinct bird genus

Boutersemia is an extinct genus of shorebirds (order Charadriiformes) known from the early Oligocene (~33 million years ago) Borgloon Formation of Belgium. The genus contains two species, Boutersemia belgica and Boutersemia parvula, both of which were described in 2001 by Gerald Mayr and Richard Smith based on fragmentary remains. Morphological comparisons with other shorebirds imply Boutersemia is a member of the family Glareolidae, although phylogenetic analyses suggest close relationships with the Jacanidae.

== Discovery and naming ==
In September 1999, Richard Smith collected various bird fossils during field work in Boutersem, Belgium, about 30 kilometres (19 mi) east of Brussels. The fossil site, consisting of outcrops of the Borgloon Formation (Boutersem Sand Member), was exposed during the construction of a high-speed railway in the region. All of the bones collected were taken to the Museum of Natural Sciences, part of the Royal Belgian Institute of Natural Sciences, in Brussels, where they are now accessioned.

Among the remains collected were several bones of a charadriiform (shorebird). In 2001, Gerald Mayr and Richard Smith, the collector of the material, described most of these as belonging to a new charadriiform genus, which they named Boutersemia. The generic name references Boutersem, the type locality. Within Boutersemia, Mayr and Smith separated the remains into two named species: B. belgica (the type species) and B. parvula. The former, named for the Latin word meaning 'Belgian', was established based on IRScNB Av 41 (the holotype specimen), the distal (toward the bottom) end of a left tarsometatarsus missing the articular end of the second metatarsal. The authors also referred a partial left and right coracoid, partial left and right humerus, and proximal (toward the top) end of a left carpometacarpus to B. belgica. The second species, B. parvula, was named for a Latin word meaning 'very small'. The holotype of this species is IRScNB Av 46, also a distal left tarsometatarsus, similar to B. belgica but only about two-thirds its size. A proximal left and two distal right humeri, a partial right coracoid, and the proximal end of a left and right carpometacarpus were also referred to B. parvula. Two distal right humeri, a partial left carpometacarpus, and a partial left coracoid were referred to Boutersmia as belonging to an indeterminate species. This material belongs to an individual intermediate in size between the two named species. Since a tarsometatarsus—the most diagnostic part of the skeleton in this genus—was not found, it could only tentatively be referred to Boutersemia, and not to a more precise species.

== Description ==
Mayr and Smith (2001) diagnosed Boutersemia as a small charadriiform with a large distal vascular foramen on the bottom edge of a broad, well-developed groove on the tarsometatarsus. There is a bony bridge between this foramen and the incisura lateralis that is shorter than the foramen. There is a distinct fossa on the first metatarsus, which indicates the genus would have borne a hallux (rear-facing toe) which was not preserved in the fossils, a feature distinguishing it from modern charadriids (plovers and their relatives), which do not have this fossa.

B. belgica is the larger of the two named species of Boutersemia, comparable in size to the extant ringed plover (Charadrius hiaticula). B. parvula is similar in size to Kittlitz's plover (Charadrius pecuarius, one of the smallest extant charadriiform species. The articular surface of the fourth metatarsal in B. belgica is proportionately slightly longer than in B. parvula. It also has a small ridge running from the os metacarpale minus to the processus pisiformis, which is absent in B. parvula. The tarsometatarsus of B. belgica is similar in size and shape to that of the possible relative Paractiornis, known from early Miocene.

== Classification ==
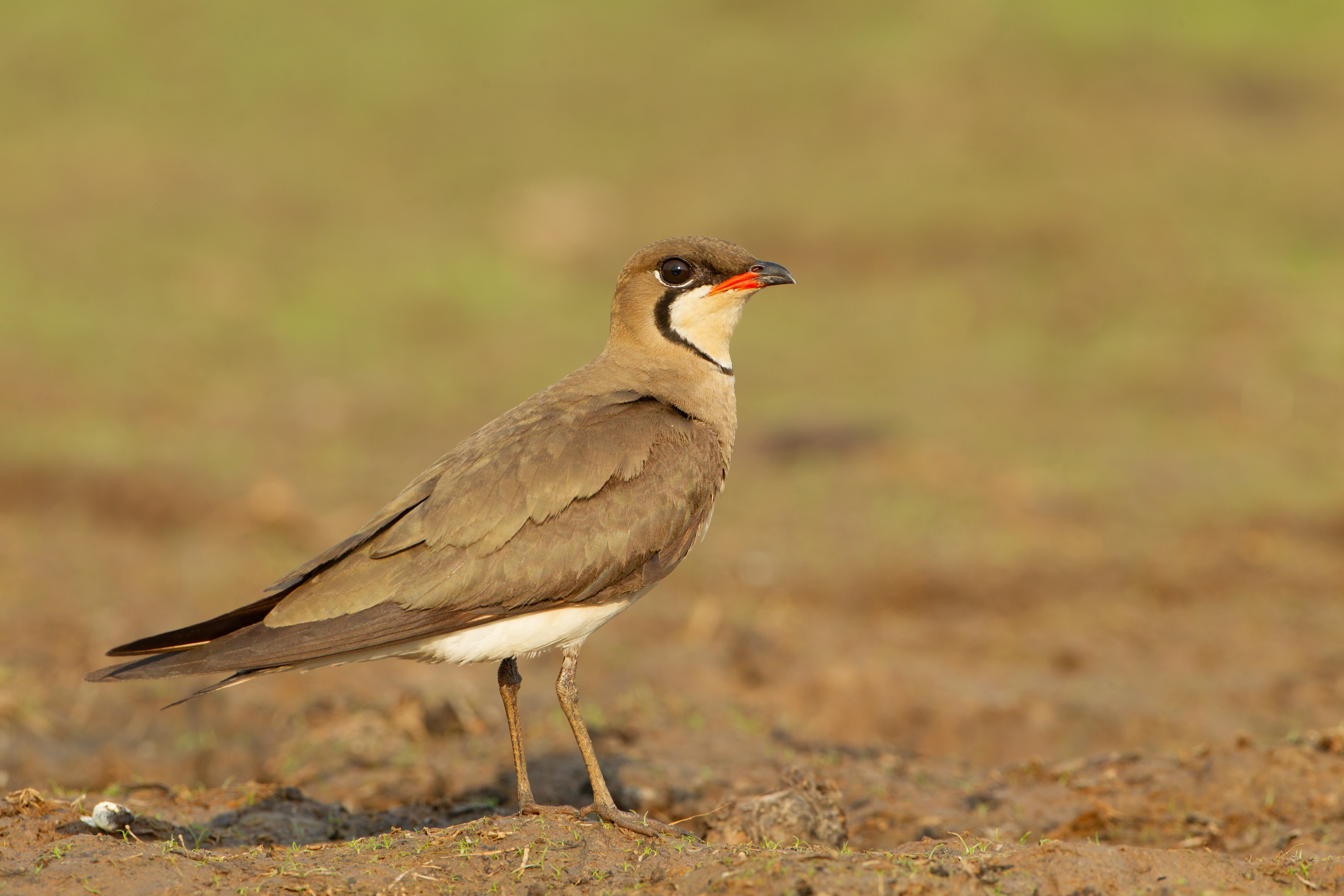
Photograph of an oriental pratincole (Glareola maldivarum), a living species of the possibly related genus Glareola

Mayr and Smith (2001) tentatively assigned Boutersemia to the charadriiform family Glareolidae. In extant Charadriiformes, the large distal vascular foramen is only found in three families: the Glareolidae, Jacanidae, and Charadriidae. The coracoids referred to Boutersemia are quite similar to those of living charadriids and glareolids, as they have a foramen for the supracoracoid nerve, which is absent in other charadriiform families such as Rostratulidae (painted-snipes), Scolopacidae (sandpipers), and Thinocoridae (seedsnipes). The distinct fossa for the hallux is plesiomorphic (ancestral) for charadriiforms, and is only absent in charadriids, suggesting Boutersemia is not a member of this clade. In a 2005 review of European Paleogene fossil birds, Mayr reiterated the tentative assignment of Boutersemia to the Glareolidae, but cautioned that this was based on similarities that may be plesiomorphic, and thus not indicative of an exclusive position in this family. Within Glareolidae, Boutersemia is most similar to Glareola and Stiltia (which may be a member of Glareola), in the subfamily Glareolinae, compared to other glareolids in the subfamily Cursoriinae (Cursorius and Rhinoptilus), which have reduced halluces and smaller distal vascular foramina.

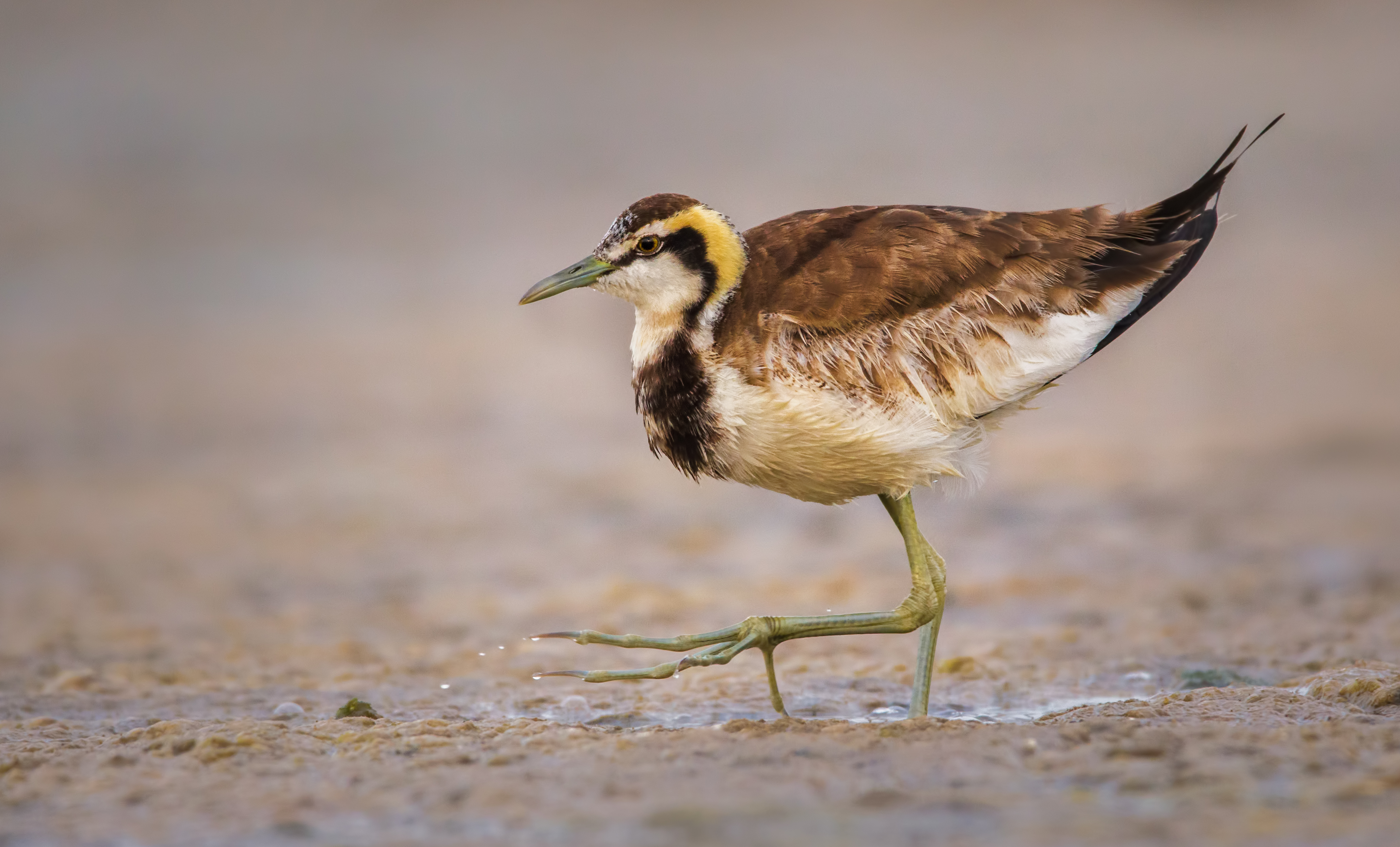
Phylogenetic analyses suggest Boutersemia may be a jacanid, similar to taxa such as this pheasant-tailed jacana (Hydrophasianus chirurgus)

In 2014, N. Adam Smith and Julia A. Clarke published an analysis focused on the evolution of the Pan-Alcidae (the charadriiform group including puffins, auks, and their relatives). To test the relationships of this group and its position within the Charadriiformes, the researchers compiled a phylogenetic matrix incorporating both morphological and molecular data, broadly sampling extant charadriiforms, with the inclusion of several extinct species. Boutersemia belgica was included, though the fragmentary nature of the material referred to it allowed it to be scored for only 1.7% of morphological characters in the matrix. Given its age, molecular data is not available. The phylogenetic analysis performed by these researchers recovered B. belgica within the Jacanidae, in an unresolved clade also including Hydrophasianus chirurgus (pheasant-tailed jacana) and the extinct jacanid Nupharanassa bulotorum. Characters supporting the placement of Boutersemia as a jacanid include a particularly large distal vascular foramen compared to other charadriiforms, a tendinal groove that is deeply incised on the anterior (front) tarsometatarsus near the end of the second metatarsal, and a compressed shaft of the tarsometatarsus. All of the characters scoreable for Boutersemia are also seen in Hydrophasianus, making it a taxonomic equivalent of this taxon. The cladogram below displays the results of these researchers' phylogenetic analysis:

- Charadriiformes
  - Charadrii (plovers and relatives)
  - - Scolopaci
      - Scolopacidae (sandpipers, curlews, and relatives)
      - Jacanidae (jacanas)
        - †Boutersemia belgica
        - †Nupharanassa bulotorum
        - Hydrophasianus chirurgus (pheasant-tailed jacana)
    - Lari
      - Rhinoptilus chalcopterus
      - - Glareolidae
        - - - Laridae
            - - Rynchops niger
              - Sternidae
          - - Stercorariidae (skuas)
            - Pan-Alcidae
              - †Mancallinae (Lucas auks)
              - Alcidae (auks, puffins, and relatives)

In 2020, De Pietri, Mayr, and Scofield published a reassessment of the charadriiform species Becassius charadriioides, which had previously been identified as a member of Scolopaci with uncertain affinities. The researchers concluded it is actually a member of the Glareolidae closely related to Boutersemia. They explained that additional comparisons with living and fossil glareolids supported this conclusion with more confidence than what had been proposed in the original 2001 description by Mayr & Smith. As part of a publication on a comprehensive time-calibrated phylogeny of charadriiforms in 2022, Černý and Natale noted that the reassessment of Becassius by De Pietri et al. relied only on overall morphology to place Boutersemia within Glareolidae, rather than providing specific apomorphies (derived traits). Since this conflicts with the phylogenetic results published by Smith & Clarke (2014)—the only phylogenetic analysis including Boutersemia published at that point—the authors concluded the affinities of Boutersemia should be regarded as uncertain.

== Palaeoenvironment ==
Both species of Boutersemia are known from the Boutersem Sand Member of the Borgloon Formation. These rock layers have been assigned to MP (Mammal Paleogene zone) 21 based on mammal fossils found there, and to NP (nannoplankton biostratigraphic zone) 22 based on dinocyst microfossils. These classifications date from 32.92 to 32.02 million years ago, during the early Oligocene epoch.

Various localities of the Boutersem Sand Member have yielded a diverse vertebrate animal fauna. Other birds have been assigned to orders including Anseriformes (waterfowl) and Gaviiformes (loons and relatives), extant families including Accipitridae (hawks, eagles, and relatives), Ardeidae (herons), Coliidae (mousebirds), Rallidae (rails), and Strigidae (true owls), and extinct families including Idiornithidae, Palaelodidae, and Sylphornithidae. Non-avian taxa include various fishes, amphibians, reptiles (including lizards, snakes, crocodilians, and turtles), and mammals (including rodents, bats, marsupials, artiodactyls, and perissodactyls).
