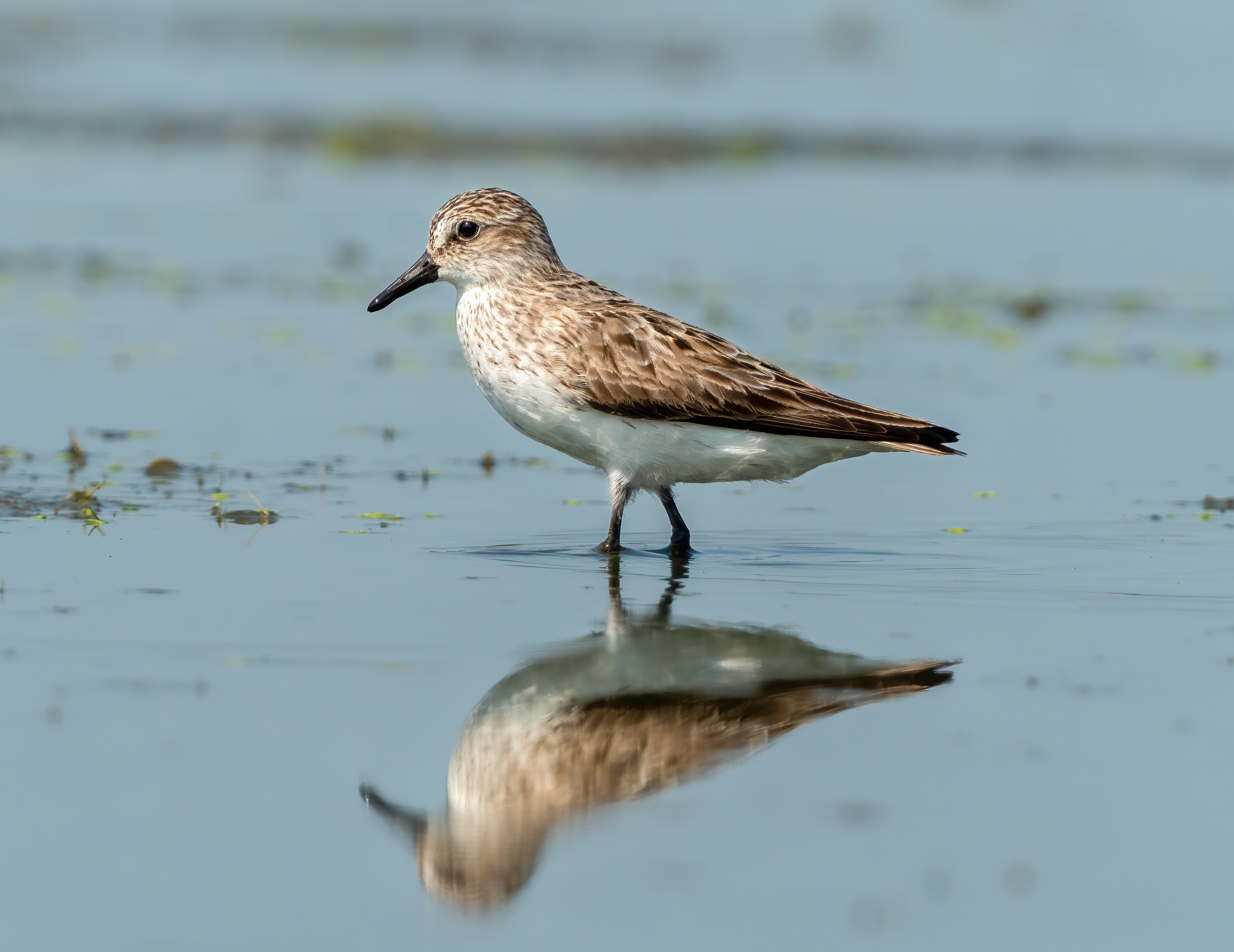
- Semipalmated sandpiper (Calidris pusilla)

Scientific classification
- Kingdom: Animalia
- Phylum: Chordata
- Class: Aves
- Clade: Gruimorphae
- Order: Charadriiformes

Groups included
- Charadrii (or Eucharadrii); Scolopaci; Dromadidae; Turnicidae (occasionally included); Glareolidae (occasionally included)

Cladistically included but traditionally excluded taxa
- Laridae; Stercorariidae; Alcidae

= Wader =

Waders Temporal range: Late Oligocene–recent

Birds of the order Charadriiformes

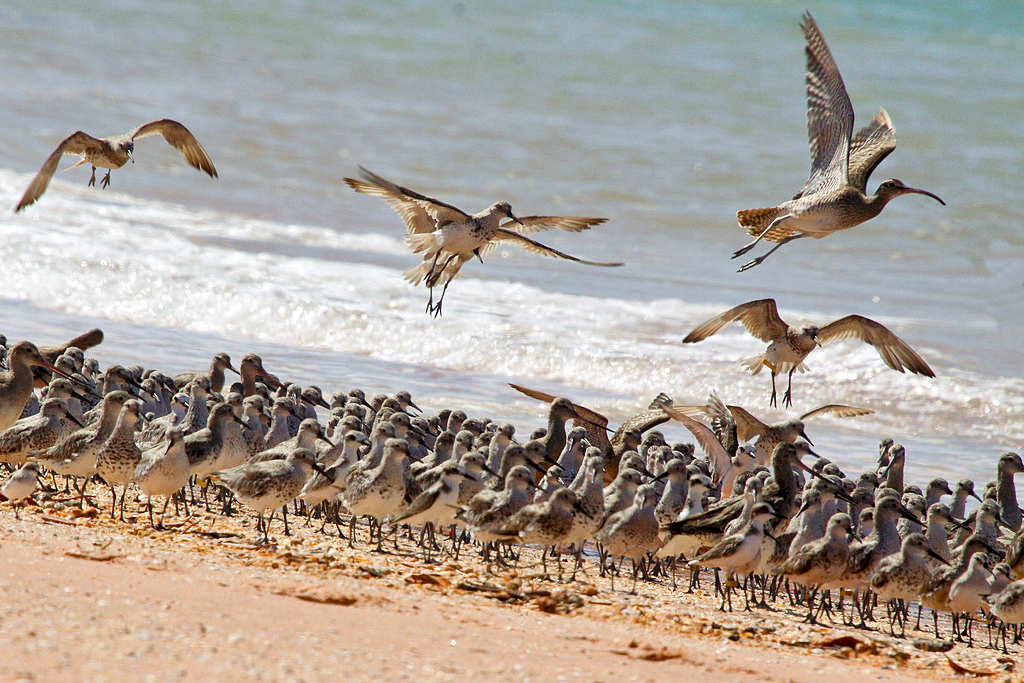
Waders roosting on the beach at high tide

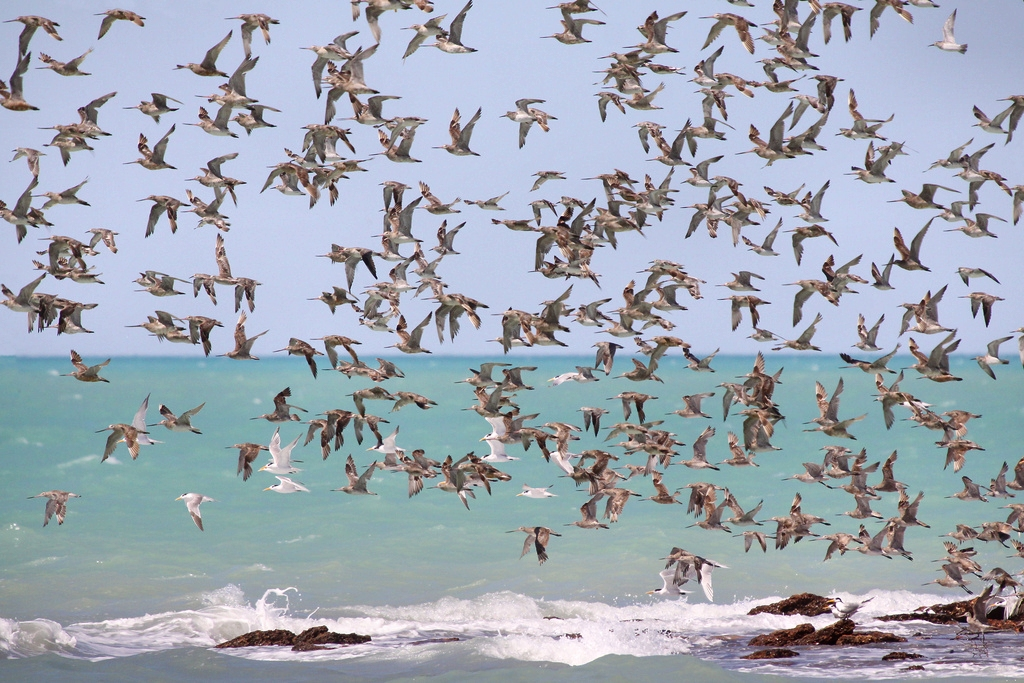
Waders in flight

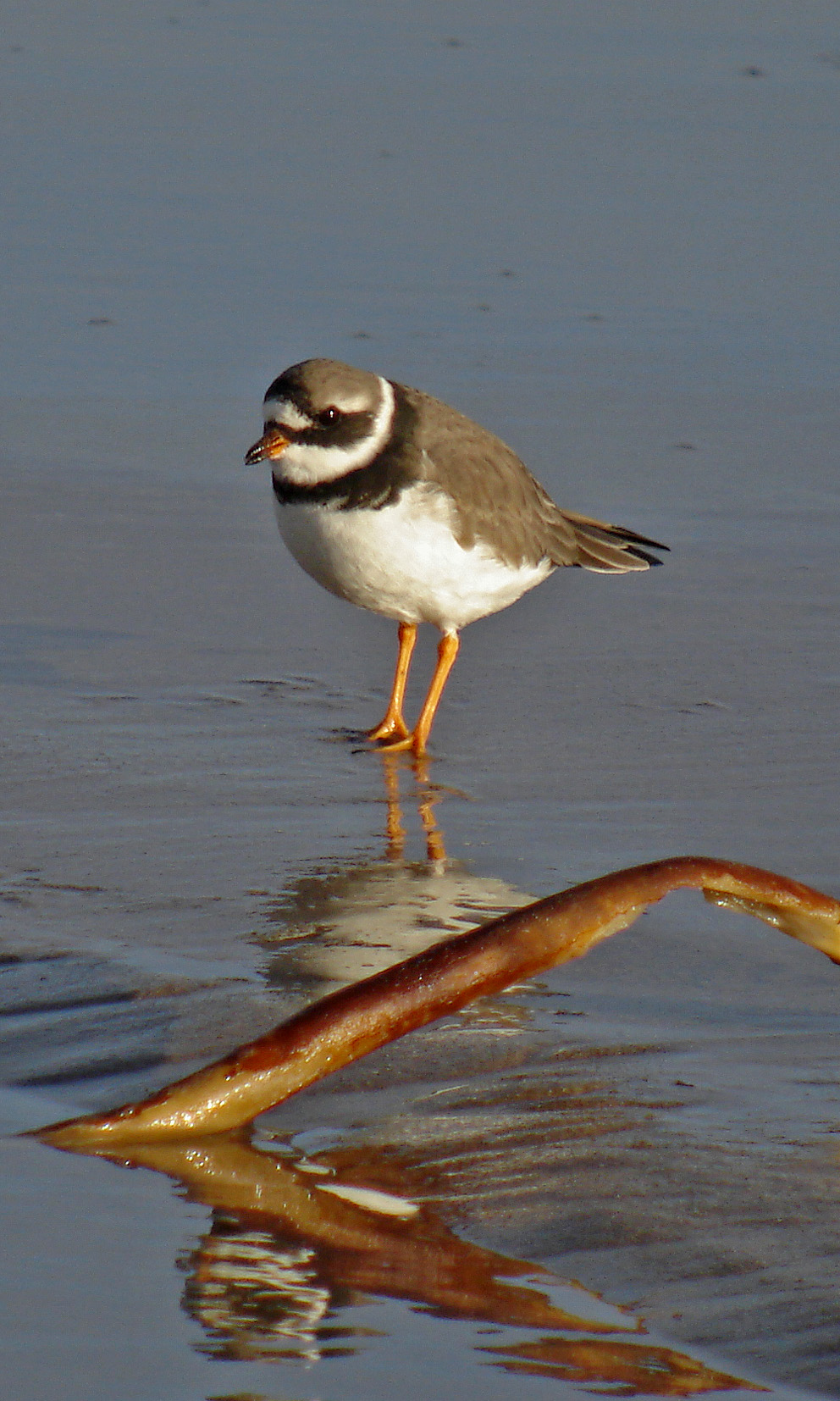
Common ringed plover wading on a shore

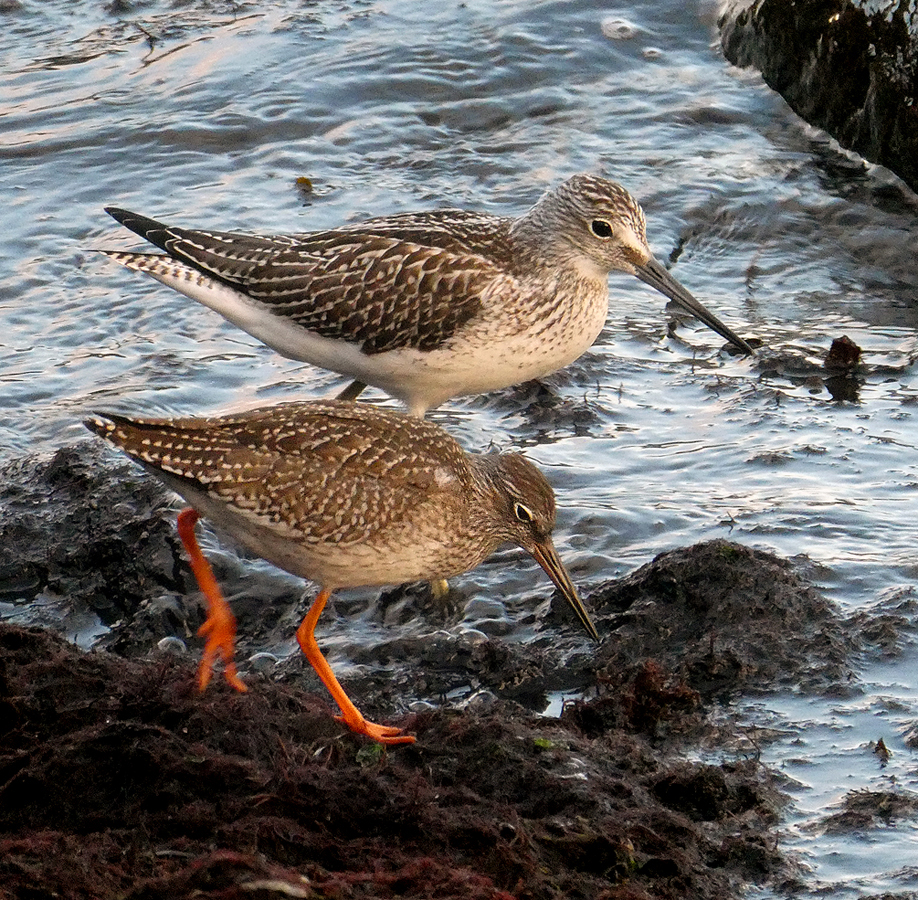
Common greenshank and common redshank.

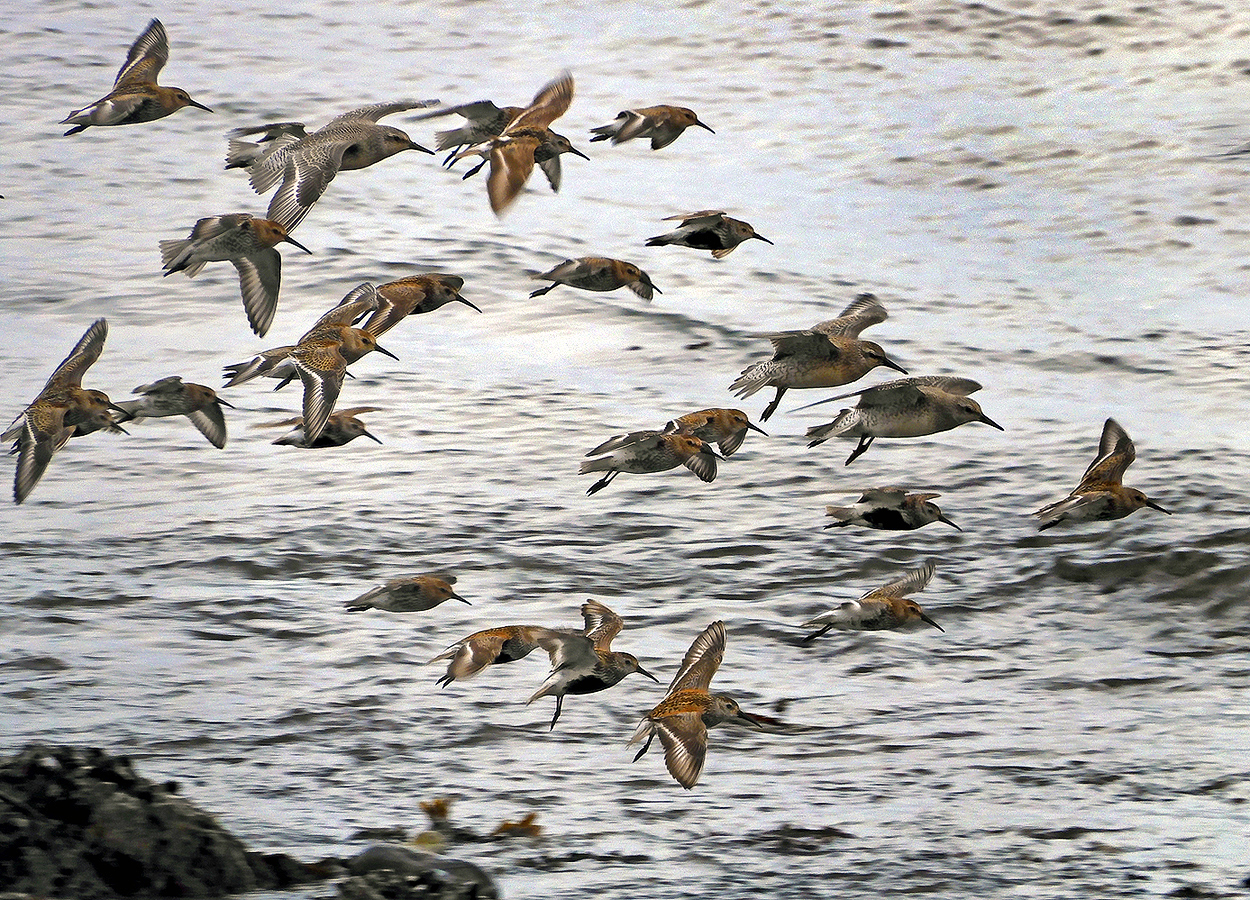
A flock of Dunlin and Red knot in Sweden

Waders or shorebirds are birds of the order Charadriiformes commonly found wading along shorelines and mudflats in order to forage for food crawling or burrowing in the mud and sand, usually small arthropods such as aquatic insects or crustaceans. The term "wader" is used in Europe, while "shorebird" is used in North America, where "wader" may be used instead to refer to long-legged wading birds such as storks and herons.

There are approximately 255 species of wader, most of which live in wetland or coastal environments. Many species of Arctic and temperate regions are strongly migratory, but tropical birds are often resident, or move only in response to rainfall patterns. Some of the Arctic species, such as the sanderling and grey plover, are amongst the longest distance migrants, spending the non-breeding season in the Southern Hemisphere; the bar-tailed godwit holds the global record for the longest non-stop flight of any bird, some flying over 13,000 km from Alaska to New Zealand.

Many of the smaller species found in coastal habitats, particularly but not exclusively the calidrids, are often named as "sandpipers", but this term does not have a strict meaning, since the upland sandpiper is a grassland species, and many others, like the wood sandpiper and solitary sandpiper, primarily use muddy or sandy margins of inland freshwater.

The smallest member of this group is the least sandpiper, small adults of which can weigh as little as 15.5 grams (0.55 oz) and measure just over 13 centimetres (5 inches). The largest species in length is to be the Far Eastern curlew, at about 63 cm (25 in) and 860 g (1 lb 14 oz), while the heaviest is the beach thick-knee at about 1 kg (2 lb 3 oz).

== Taxonomy ==
Formerly, the waders were united in a single suborder Charadrii, but this has turned out to be a "wastebasket taxon", uniting no fewer than four charadriiform lineages in a paraphyletic assemblage. However, it indicated that the plains-wanderer (currently placed in Pedionomidae) belonged to one of these assemblages. Following recent studies (Ericson et al., 2003; Paton et al., 2003; Thomas et al., 2004a, b; van Tuinen et al., 2004; Paton & Baker, 2006; Černý & Natale 2022), the waders may be more accurately subdivided as follows, with Charadrii being repurposed into a monophyletic suborder of plovers, oystercatchers, and their close relatives.

The waders are traditionally a group of two charadriiform suborders which include 16 families. Species in the third charadriiform suborder, Lari, are not universally considered as waders, though the families in Lari which may variously be included are listed below as well.

- Suborder Charadrii (or Eucharadrii)
  - Family Burhinidae – stone-curlews, thick-knees (10 species)
  - Family Pluvianellidae – Magellanic plover (1 species)
  - Family Chionidae – sheathbills (2 species)
  - Family Pluvianidae – Egyptian plover (1 species)
  - Family Charadriidae – plovers, lapwings (68 species)
  - Family Recurvirostridae – stilts, avocets (10 species)
  - Family Ibidorhynchidae – ibisbill (1 species)
  - Family Haematopodidae – oystercatchers (12 species)
- Suborder Scolopaci
  - Family Rostratulidae – painted-snipes (3 species)
  - Family Jacanidae – jacanas (8 species)
  - Family Pedionomidae – plains-wanderer (1 species)
  - Family Thinocoridae – seedsnipes (4 species)
  - Family Scolopacidae – sandpipers, snipes (98 species)
- Suborder Lari
  - Family Turnicidae – buttonquail (18 species)
  - Family Dromadidae – crab-plover (1 species)
  - Family Glareolidae – coursers, pratincoles (17 species)

== Characteristics ==
Shorebirds is a blanket term used to refer to multiple bird species that live in wet, coastal environments. Because most these species spend much of their time near bodies of water, many have long legs suitable for wading (hence the name 'Waders'). Some species prefer locations with rocks or mud. Many shorebirds display migratory patterns and often migrate before breeding season. These behaviours explain the long wing lengths observed in species, and can also account for the efficient metabolisms that give the birds energy during long migrations.

The majority of species eat small invertebrates picked out of mud or exposed soil. Different lengths of bills enable different species to feed in the same habitat, particularly on the coast, without direct competition for food. Many waders have sensitive nerve endings at the end of their bills which enable them to detect prey items hidden in mud or soft soil. Some larger species, particularly those adapted to drier habitats will take larger prey including insects and small reptiles.

=== Sexual dimorphism ===
Shorebirds, like many other animals, exhibit phenotypic differences between males and females, also known as sexual dimorphism. In shorebirds, various sexual dimorphism is seen, including, but not limited to, size (e.g. body size, bill length), colour, and agility. In polygynous species, where one male individual mates with multiple female partners over his lifetime, dimorphisms tend to be more diverse. In monogamous species, where male individuals mate with a single female partner, males typically do not have distinctive dimorphic characteristics such as coloured feathers, but they still tend to be larger in size compared to females. The suborder Charadrii displays the widest range of sexual dimorphisms seen in the order Charadriiformes. However, cases of sexual monomorphism, where there are no distinguishing physical features besides external genitalia, are also seen in this order.

=== Sexual selection ===
One of the biggest factors that leads to the development of sexual dimorphism in shorebirds is sexual selection. Males with ideal characteristics favoured by females are more likely to reproduce and pass on their genetic information to their offspring better than the males who lack such characteristics. Mentioned earlier, male shorebirds are typically larger in size compared to their female counterparts. Competition between males tends to lead to sexual selection toward larger males and as a result, an increase in dimorphism. Bigger males tend to have greater access (and appeal) to female mates because their larger size aids them in defeating other competitors. Likewise, if the species exhibits gender role reversal (where males take on roles traditionally done by females such as childcare and feeding), then males will select female mates based on traits that are the most appealing. In the Jacana species, females compete with each other for access to male mates, so females are larger in size. Males choose female mates based on who presents herself as the strongest and who 'owns' the most territory.

=== Natural selection ===
Another factor that leads to the development of dimorphisms in species is natural selection. Natural selection focuses on traits and the environment's response to the traits in question; if the said trait increases the overall fitness of the individual possessing it, then it will be 'selected' and eventually become a permanent part of the population's gene pool. For example, depending on the food available in a shorebird specie's respective niche, bigger bill sizes may be favoured in all individuals. This would essentially lead to monomorphism within the species but is subject to change once sexual selection acts on the trait. Sexual selection could give rise to males with relatively larger bills than females if males used their bills to compete with other males. If larger bill size assisted the male in gathering resources, it would also make him more attractive to female mates.

== See also ==
- Hybridisation in shorebirds
- List of Charadriiformes by population

== Sources ==
- Černý, D. & Natale, R. (2022). Comprehensive taxon sampling and vetted fossils help clarify the time tree of shorebirds (Aves, Charadriiformes). Molecular Phylogenetics and Evolution 177: 107620 doi:10.1016/j.ympev.2022.107620.
- Ericson, P. G. P.; Envall, I.; Irestedt, M.; & Norman, J. A. (2003). Inter-familial relationships of the shorebirds (Aves: Charadriiformes) based on nuclear DNA sequence data. BMC Evol. Biol. 3: 16. doi:10.1186/1471-2148-3-16 PDF fulltext
- Pandiyan, J. and S. Asokan. (2015). Habitat use of pattern of tidal mud and sandflats by shorebirds (charadriiformes) Wintering in southern India. Coastal Conservation https://doi.org/10.1007/s11852-015-0413-9.
- Paton, Tara A.; & Baker, Allan J. (2006). Sequences from 14 mitochondrial genes provide a well-supported phylogeny of the Charadriiform birds congruent with the nuclear RAG-1 tree. Molecular Phylogenetics and Evolution 39(3): 657–667. doi:10.1016/j.ympev.2006.01.011 PMID 16531074 (HTML abstract)
- Paton, T. A.; Baker, A. J.; Groth, J. G.; & Barrowclough, G. F. (2003). RAG-1 sequences resolve phylogenetic relationships within charadriiform birds. Molecular Phylogenetics and Evolution 29: 268–278. doi:10.1016/S1055-7903(03)00098-8 PMID 13678682 (HTML abstract)
- Thomas, Gavin H.; Wills, Matthew A. & Székely, Tamás (2004a). Phylogeny of shorebirds, gulls, and alcids (Aves: Charadrii) from the cytochrome-b gene: parsimony, Bayesian inference, minimum evolution, and quartet puzzling. Molecular Phylogenetics and Evolution 30(3): 516–526. doi:10.1016/S1055-7903(03)00222-7 (HTML abstract)
- Thomas, Gavin H.; Wills, Matthew A.; & Székely, Tamás (2004b). A supertree approach to shorebird phylogeny. BMC Evol. Biol. 4: 28. doi:10.1186/1471-2148-4-28 PMID 15329156 PDF fulltext Supplementary Material
- van Tuinen, Marcel; Waterhouse, David; & Dyke, Gareth J. (2004). Avian molecular systematics on the rebound: a fresh look at modern shorebird phylogenetic relationships. Journal of Avian Biology 35(3): 191–194. PDF fulltext
- Explore the World With Shorebirds. (2004). U.S. Fish and Wildlife Service. Web. http://digitalmedia.fws.gov/cdm/ref/collection/document/id/1598
- Lindenfors, P.; Szekely, T.; and Reynolds, J. D. (2003). Directional Changes in Sexual Size Dimorphism in Shorebirds, Gulls and Alcids. Journal of Evolutionary Biology J Evolution Biol: 930–38. Print.
- Szekely, T.; Freckleton, R.; & Reynolds, J. (2004). Sexual selection explains Rensch's rule of size dimorphism in shorebirds. Proceedings of the National Academy of Sciences. 101(33): 12224–12227.
- Szekely, Tamas; John D. Reynolds; and Jordi Figuerola. (2000) Sexual Size Dimorphism in Shorebirds, Gulls, and Alcids: The Influence of Sexual and Natural Selection. Evolution 54(4): 1404–413.
