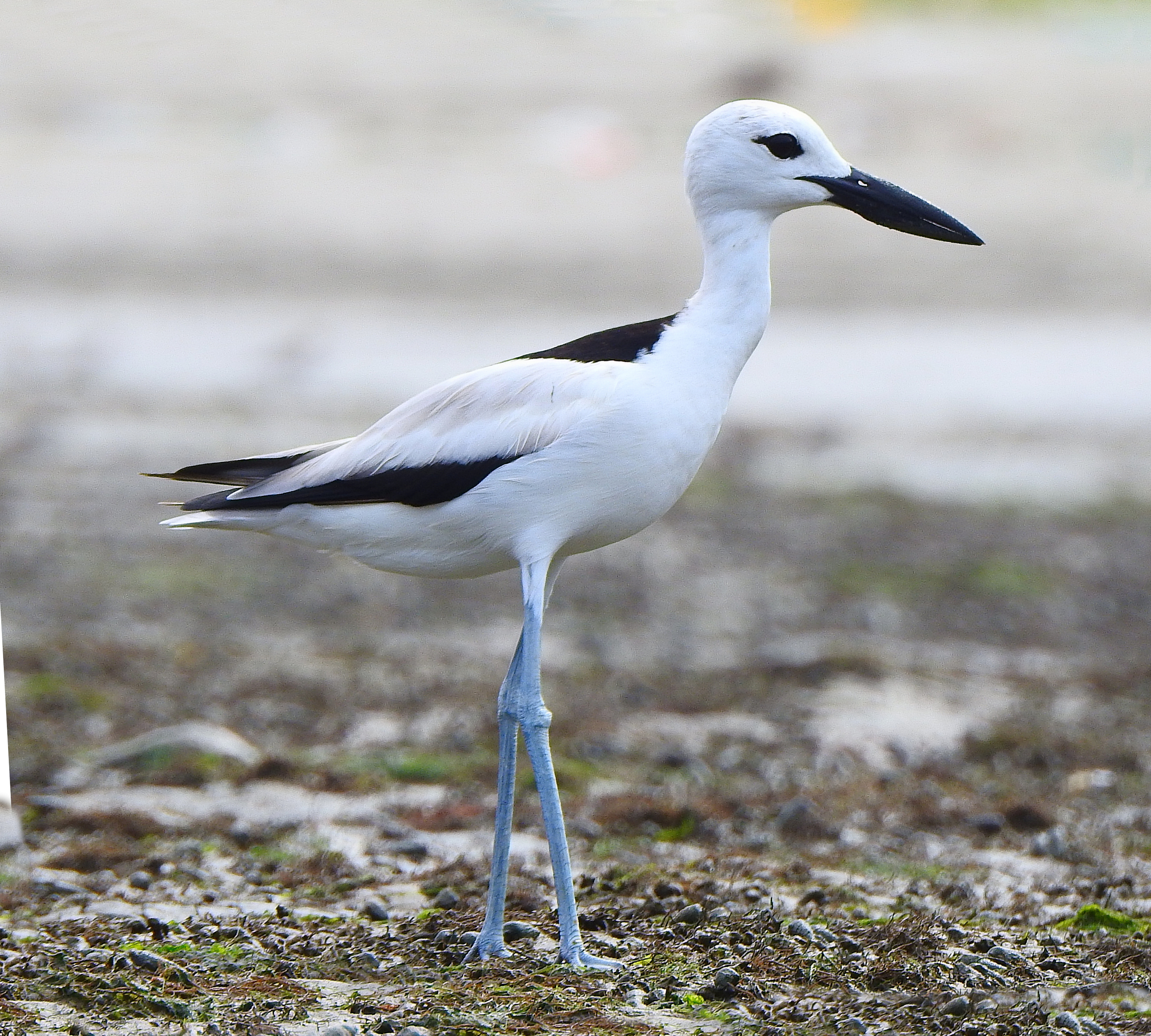
- Adult in breeding plumage

Conservation status
- Least Concern (IUCN 3.1)

Scientific classification
- Kingdom: Animalia
- Phylum: Chordata
- Class: Aves
- Order: Charadriiformes
- Suborder: Lari
- Family: Dromadidae; G.R. Gray, 1840
- Genus: Dromas; Paykull, 1805
- Species: D. ardeola

Binomial name
- Dromas ardeola Paykull, 1805
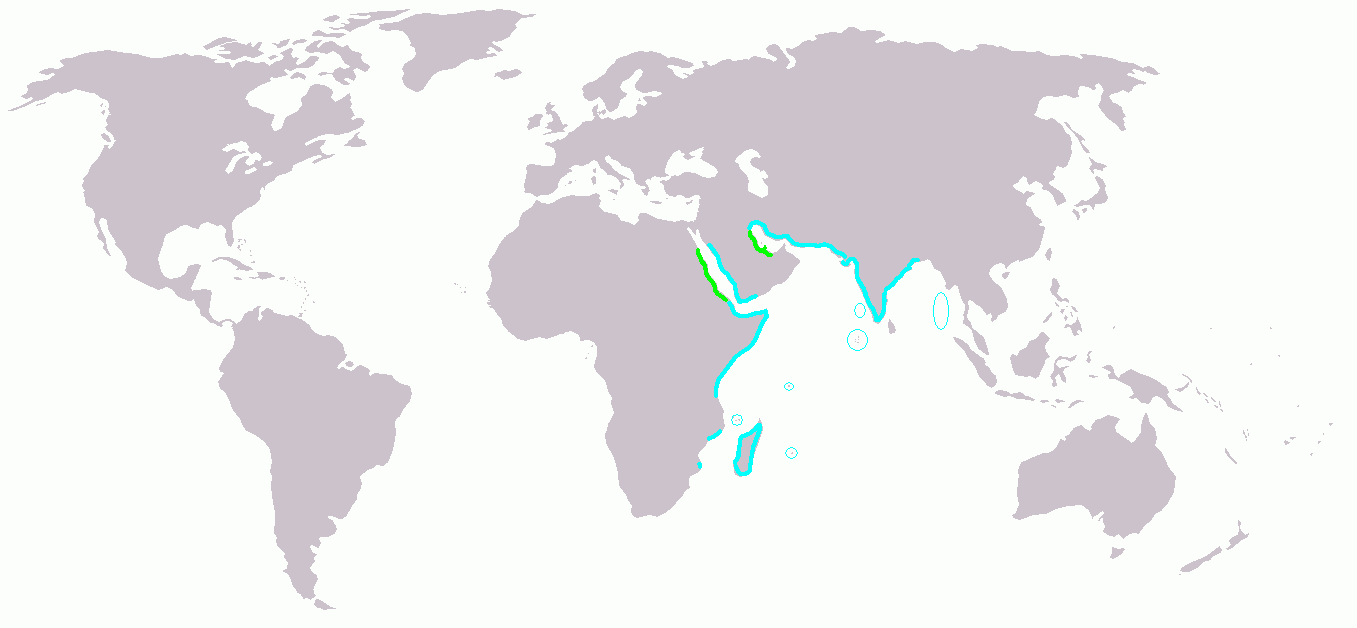

= Crab-plover =

Species of bird

The crab-plover or crab plover (Dromas ardeola) is a coastal wader (shorebird). It is the only member of the genus Dromas and the family Dromadidae. It is unique among waders in making use of ground warmth to aid the incubation of its eggs. The crab-plover is classified in the suborder Lari in a group together with the Glareolidae (pratincoles and coursers), and next most closely related to the Laridae (gulls and terns), rather than to most other waders such as plovers (suborder Charadrii) and sandpipers (suborder Scolopaci).

== Description ==
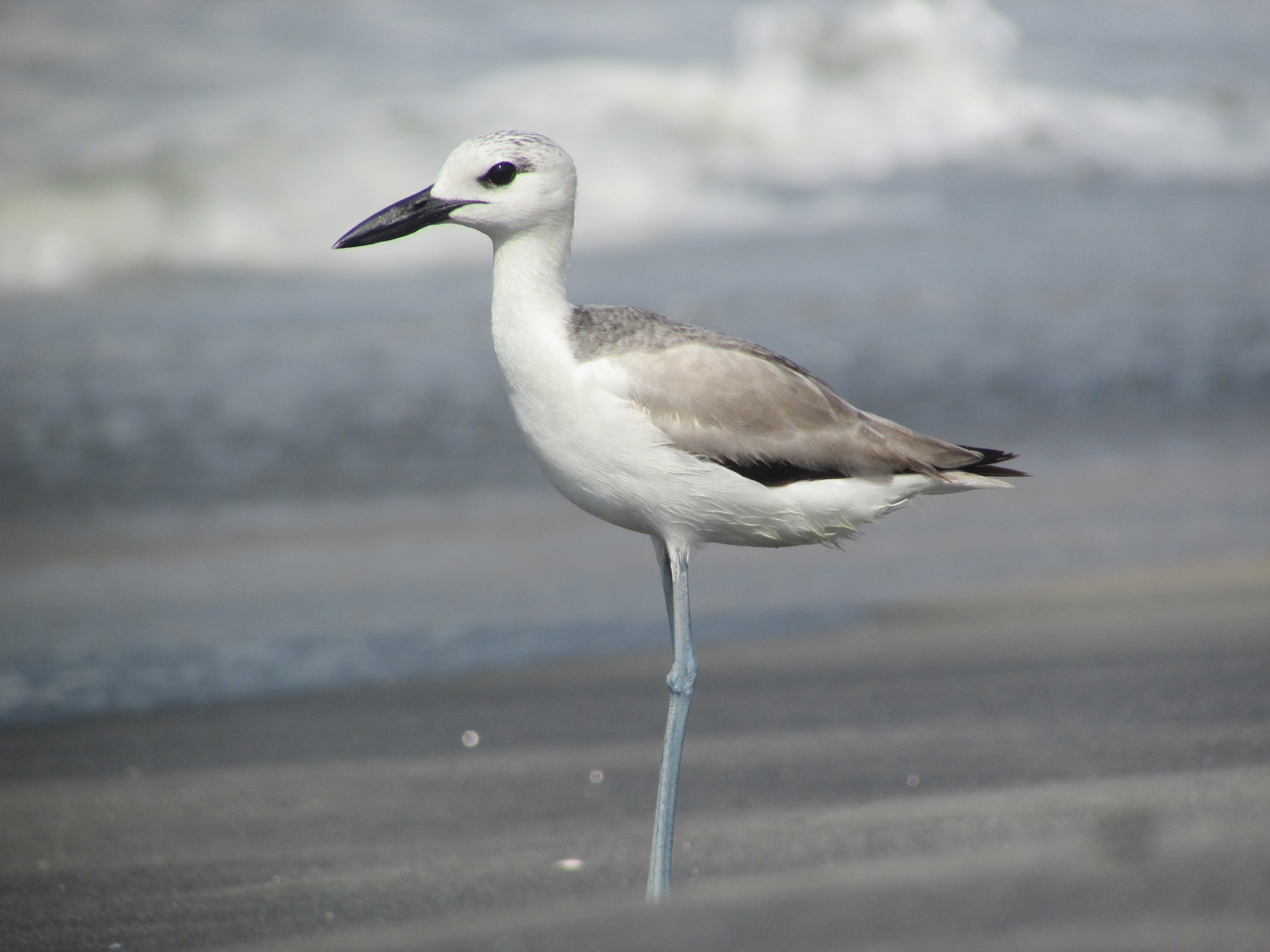
Juvenile plumage

This bird resembles a plover, but has very long bluish-grey legs and a strong heavy black bill. Its pied plumage and long-necked upright posture with heavy bill makes it distinctive and unmistakable; apart from the massive bill, the plumage pattern is most reminiscent of a pied avocet. Its bill is unique among waders, and specialised for eating crabs. It has partially webbed toes. The plumage is white except for black on its back and in the primary feathers of the wings; in breeding plumage, the head is white apart from the small black eye patch, while in non-breeding plumage, the head is streaked grey. They are noisy birds, calling frequently on their breeding sites and in their wintering grounds. The usual call is a ka similar to that of the bar-tailed godwit but repeated rapidly. Flocks may produce a whinnying sound that rises and at in the breeding season produce whistling kew-ki-ki notes.

Males and females are not easily distinguished but males have a heavier and longer bill. Juveniles have the mantle grey rather than black, and remain in this plumage for a year. Flocks fly in lines or "V" formations.

The crab-plover is one of the species to which the Agreement on the Conservation of African-Eurasian Migratory Waterbirds (AEWA) applies.

== Range ==
It is resident on the coasts and islands of the Indian Ocean, where it feeds on crabs and other small animals. They are gregarious and will feed in large groups, at night and during dawn and dusk as well as during the day; this crepuscular and nocturnal behaviour is more common during the breeding season. They breed around the Arabian Sea, Gulf of Oman and the Persian Gulf, Red Sea and Somalia in the months of April to July then disperse across the Indian Ocean in August as far as the Andaman Islands and Sri Lanka in the east and Tanzania and Madagascar.

== Habits ==
The crab-plover is unusual for waders in that it nests in burrows in sandy banks. In the Red Sea region, the breeding season begins around the middle of May. It is a colonial breeder, nesting in colonies as large 1500 pairs. It lays one white egg, occasionally two, which are large for its body size. The nest burrow temperature is optimal due to solar radiation and the parents are able to leave the nest unattended for as long as 58 hours. The chicks are also unique for the usually nidifugous waders in being unable to walk and remain in the nest for several days after hatching, having food brought to them. Even once they fledge they have a long period of parental care afterwards. Both males and females take care of the young.

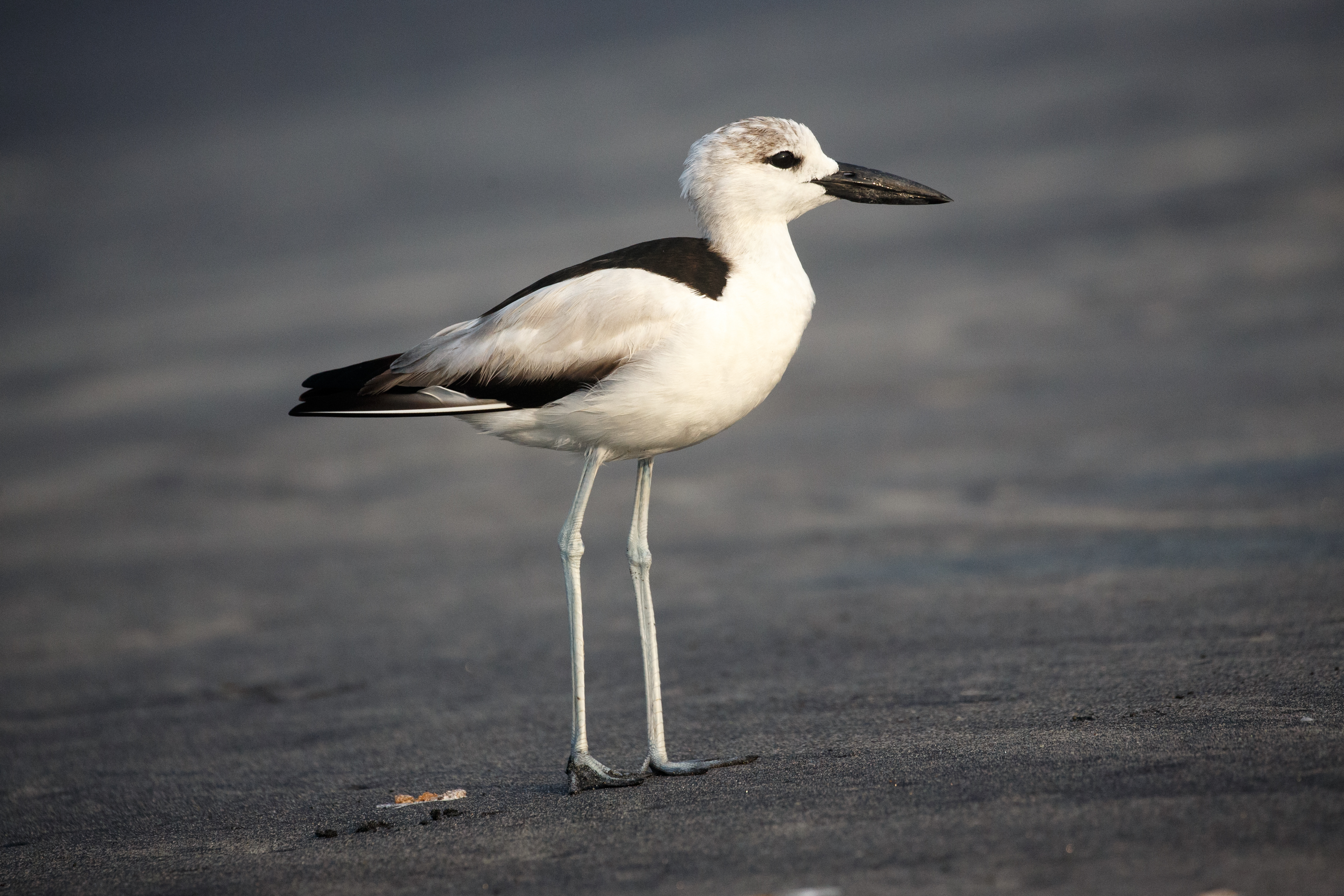
Adult non-breeding plumage, with streaked head

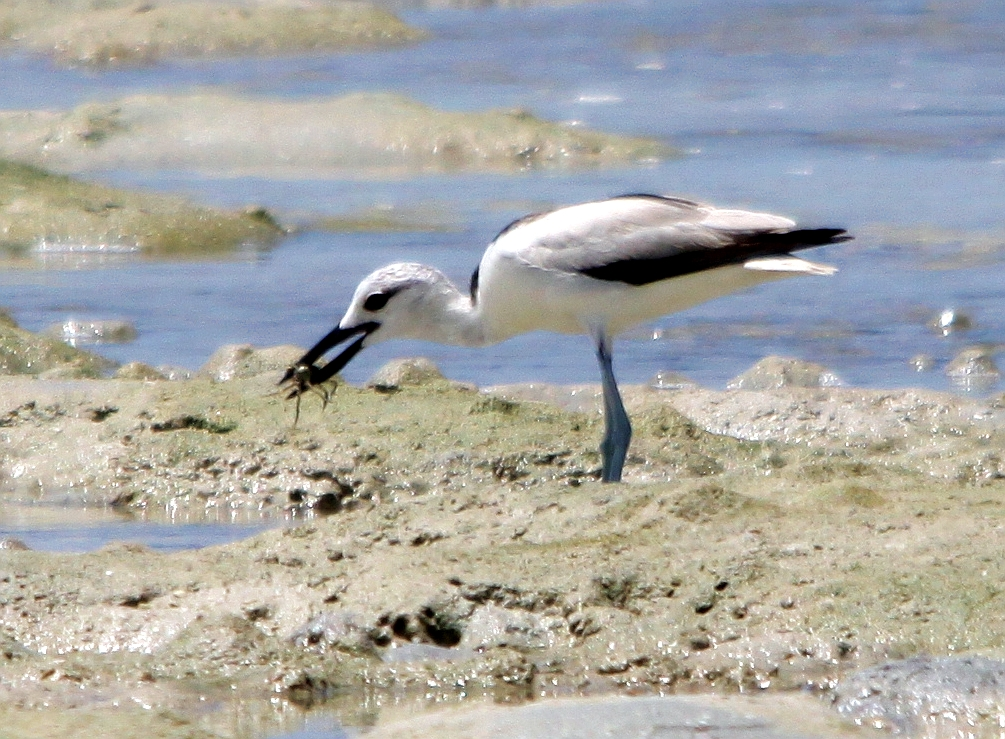
Crab-plover eating a crab

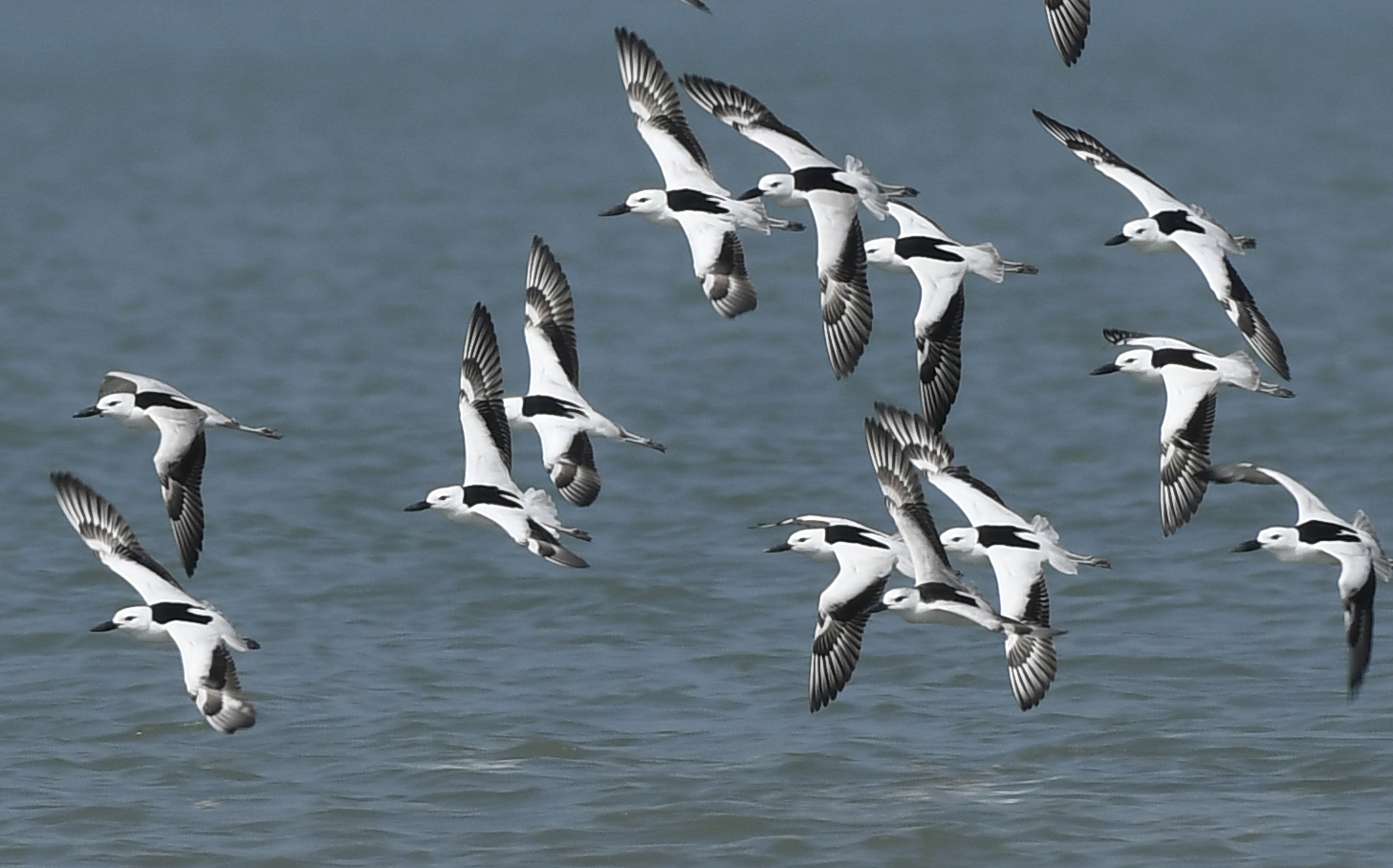
Flock in flight

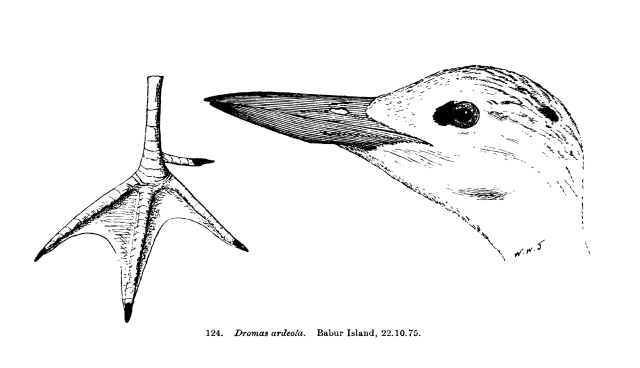
The feet are partially webbed
