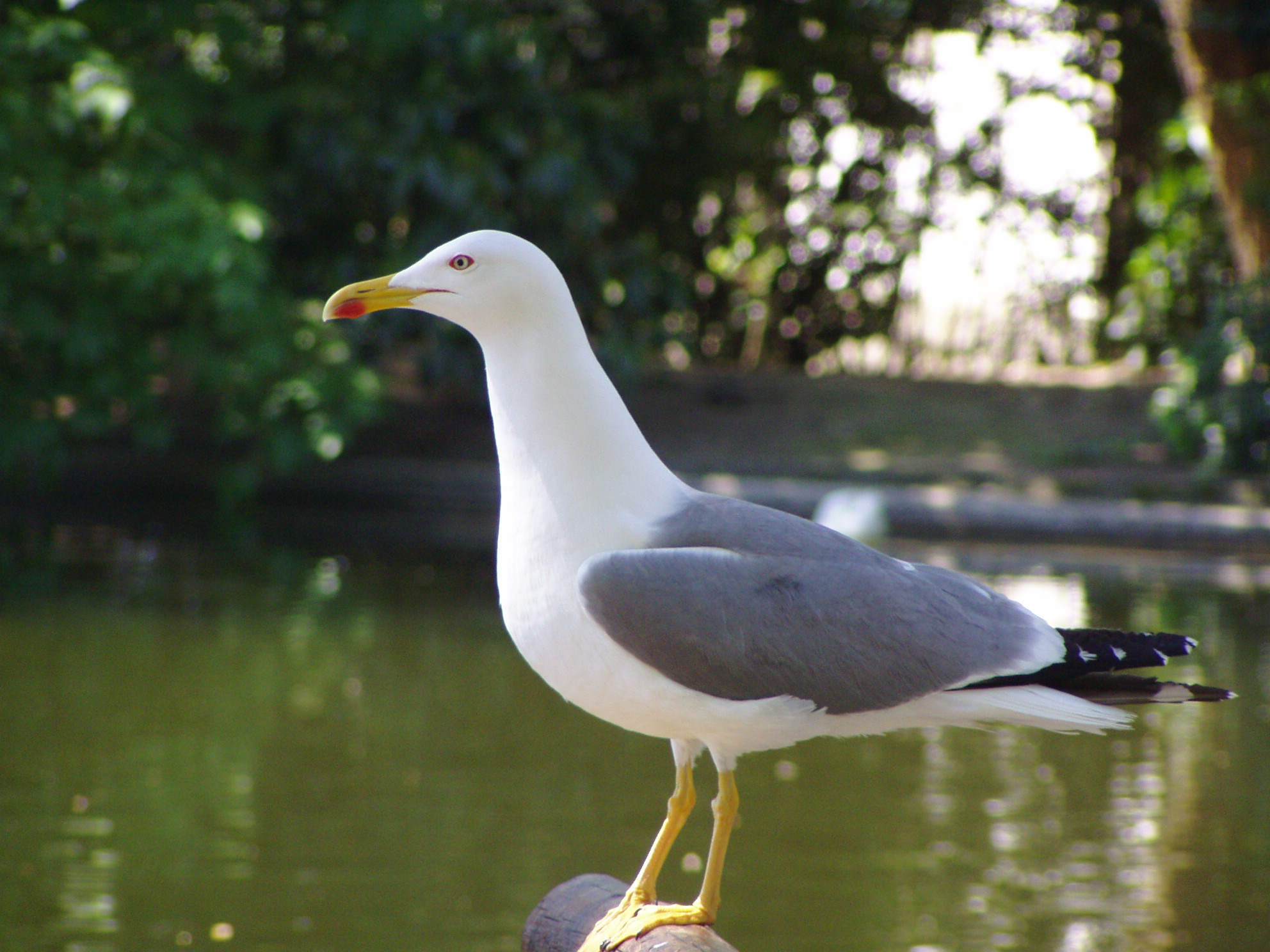
- Atlantic yellow-legged gull

Scientific classification
- Kingdom: Animalia
- Phylum: Chordata
- Class: Aves
- Order: Charadriiformes
- Suborder: Lari; Sharpe, 1891

Families
- Turnicidae; Dromadidae; Glareolidae; Laridae; Stercorariidae; Alcidae

= Lari (bird) =

Lari Temporal range: Eocene-Holocene, 35–0 Ma

Suborder of birds

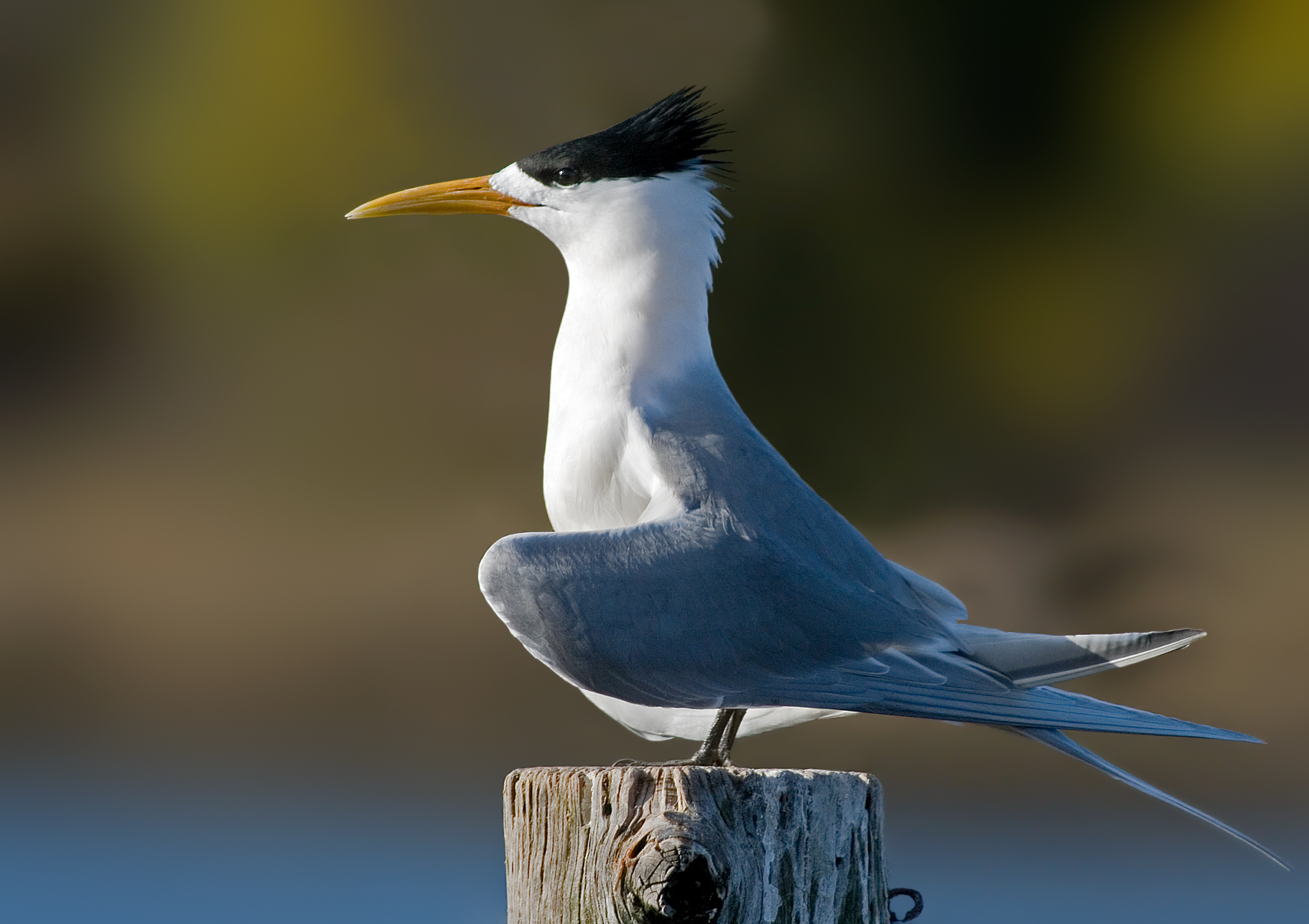
Greater crested tern displaying in Tasmania.

The suborder Lari is the part of the order Charadriiformes that includes the gulls, terns, skuas and skimmers; the rest of the order is made up of the Charadrii and Scolopaci. The auks and buttonquails are now placed into the Lari too, following recent research.

The larids are generally larger species that take fish from the sea. Several gulls and skuas will also take food items from beaches, or rob smaller species, and some have become adapted to inland environments.

The suborder Lari includes six families:

- Family Dromadidae – crab-plover
- Family Glareolidae – coursers, pratincoles (17 species)
- Family Laridae – gulls, terns, skimmers (103 species)
- Family Stercorariidae – skuas (7 species)
- Family Alcidae – auks (25 species)
- Family Turnicidae – buttonquails (18 species)

- Lari
  - Turnicidae – buttonquails (18 species)
  - - - Dromadidae – crab-plover
      - Glareolidae – coursers, pratincoles (17 species)
    - - Laridae – gulls, terns, skimmers (103 species)
      - - Stercorariidae – skuas (7 species)
        - Alcidae – auks (25 species)

A family level phylogeny of the suborder Lari based a study by Heiner Kuhl and collaborators published in 2020. The families and the number of species are from the list maintained by Frank Gill, Pamela Rasmussen and David Donsker on behalf of the International Ornithologists' Union.

== Sources ==
- Paton, Tara A.; Baker, Allan J. (2006). "Sequences from 14 mitochondrial genes provide a well-supported phylogeny of the Charadriiform birds congruent with the nuclear RAG-1 tree". Molecular Phylogenetics and Evolution. 39 (3): 657–667. doi:10.1016/j.ympev.2006.01.011. PMID 16531074.
- Paton, T. A.; Baker, A. J.; Groth, J. G.; Barrowclough, G. F. (2003). "RAG-1 sequences resolve phylogenetic relationships within charadriiform birds". Molecular Phylogenetics and Evolution. 29 (2): 268–278. doi:10.1016/S1055-7903(03)00098-8. PMID 13678682.
- Thomas, Gavin H.; Wills, Matthew A.; Székely, Tamás (2004). "A supertree approach to shorebird phylogeny". BMC Evol. Biol. 4: 28. doi:10.1186/1471-2148-4-28. PMC 515296. PMID 15329156.
