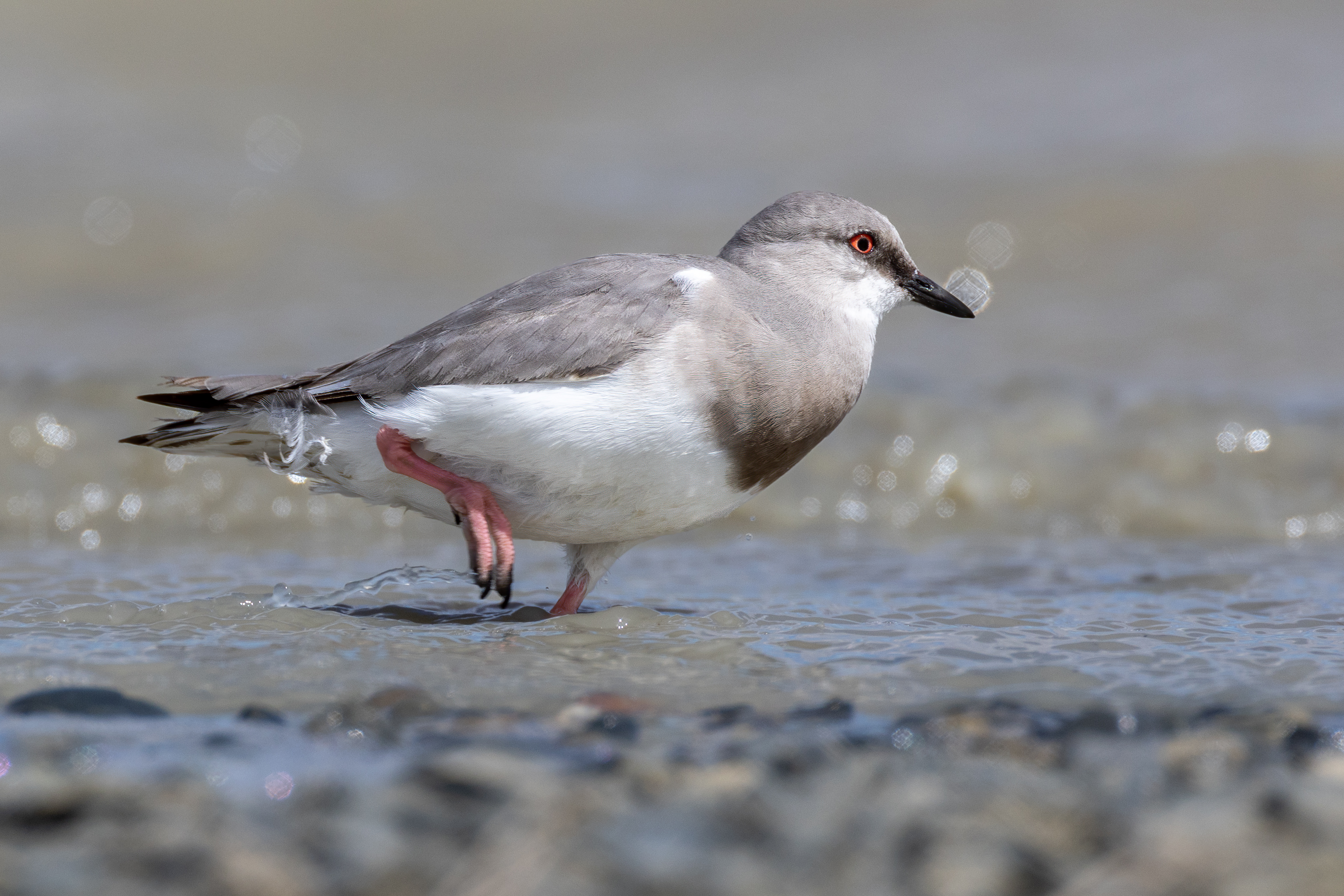

Conservation status
- Vulnerable (IUCN 3.1)

Scientific classification
- Kingdom: Animalia
- Phylum: Chordata
- Class: Aves
- Order: Charadriiformes
- Suborder: Charadrii
- Family: Pluvianellidae; Jehl, 1975
- Genus: Pluvianellus; G.R. Gray, 1846
- Species: P. socialis

Binomial name
- Pluvianellus socialis G.R. Gray, 1846

= Magellanic plover =

Species of bird

The Magellanic plover (Pluvianellus socialis) is a rare wader endemic to southernmost South America.

== Taxonomy ==
It was long placed in with the other plovers in the family Charadriidae; however, behavioural evidence suggested they were distinct, and molecular studies confirmed this, suggesting that they are actually more closely related to the sheathbills, a uniquely Antarctic family. As such it is now placed in its own family, Pluvianellidae.

== Description ==
This species is in its structure and habits much like a turnstone, but it cannot be confused with any other wader species. Its upperparts and breast are pale grey, and the rest of the underparts are white. It has short red legs, a black bill and red eyes. In young birds, the eyes and legs are yellowish in colour, and the plumage is grey overall with scaling. The call is a dovelike coo.

== Distribution and habitat ==
This species is not a long-distance migrant, although some birds move further north in southern Argentina in winter. The species breeds inland and then moves to the coast during the winter, particularly to estuaries. One of their preferred areas during winter is in Puerto Madryn and Península Valdes, Chubut, Argentina (Jehl 1975).

== Behaviour ==
=== Breeding ===
This species breeds near water, usually saline lakes but there are reports of nests near rivers as well. Pairs defend territories, and both parents share incubation duties. It lays two large eggs on the ground, although usually only one chick survives. One unique aspect of its behaviour and physiology is its method of feeding its chicks. Chicks are fed by regurgitating food stored in the crop, this species being the only wader to do so.

=== Feeding ===
Magellanic plovers feed on small invertebrates, picked from the ground, or from under pebbles, again like a turnstone. They have been observed collecting worms in the bill in a similar fashion to a puffin.

== Bibliography ==
- Shorebirds by Hayman, Marchant and Prater, ISBN 0-7099-2034-2
