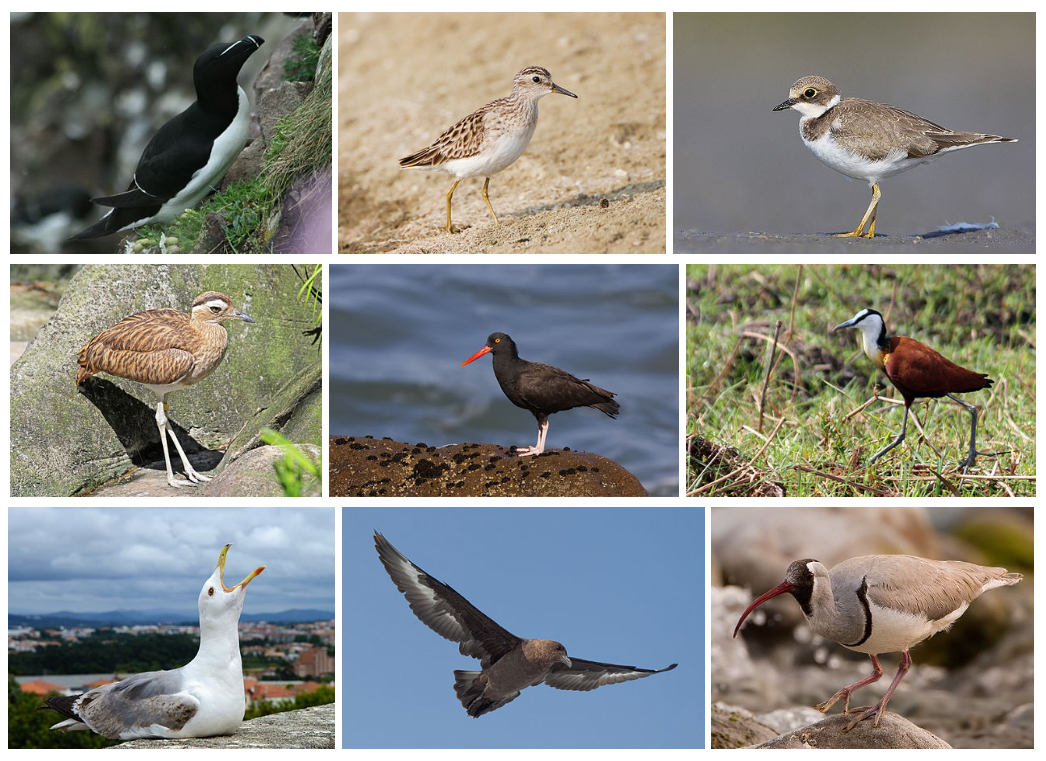
- Several members of the order

Scientific classification
- Kingdom: Animalia
- Phylum: Chordata
- Class: Aves
- Clade: Elementaves
- (unranked): Gruae
- Clade: Gruimorphae
- Order: Charadriiformes; Huxley, 1867

Suborders
- Charadrii; Scolopaci; Lari

= Charadriiformes =

Charadriiformes Temporal range: Eocene -Holocene, 55–0 Ma Possible an early origin based on molecular clock

Order of birds

Charadriiformes (/kəˈrædri.ɪfɔːrmiːz/, from Charadrius, the type genus of family Charadriidae) is a diverse order of small to medium-large birds. It includes about 390 species and has members in all parts of the world. Most charadriiform birds live near water and eat invertebrates or other small animals; however, some are pelagic (seabirds), others frequent deserts, and a few are found in dense forest. Members of this group can also collectively be referred to as shorebirds.

== Taxonomy, systematics and evolution ==
The order is divided into three suborders:

- Charadrii: typical shorebirds, most of which feed by probing in the mud or picking items off the surface in both coastal and freshwater environments.
- The gulls and their allies (or "Lari"): these are generally larger species which take fish from the sea. Several gulls and skuas will also take food items from beaches, or rob smaller species, and some have become adapted to inland environments.
- The snipes (or "Scolopaci") are small gregarious waders including the pipers and jacanas.

The Sibley-Ahlquist taxonomy lumps all the Charadriiformes together with other seabirds and birds of prey into a greatly enlarged order Ciconiiformes. However, the resolution of the DNA-DNA hybridization technique used by Sibley & Ahlquist was not sufficient to properly resolve the relationships in this group, and indeed it appears as if the Charadriiformes constitute a single large and very distinctive lineage of modern birds of their own.

The auks, usually considered distinct because of their peculiar morphology, are more likely related to gulls, the "distinctness" being a result of adaptation for diving.

=== Families ===
The order Charadriiformes contains 3 suborders, 19 families and 391 species.

- Suborder Charadrii
  - Family Burhinidae – stone-curlews, thick-knees (10 species)
  - Family Pluvianellidae – Magellanic plover
  - Family Chionidae – sheathbills (2 species)
  - Family Pluvianidae – Egyptian plover
  - Family Charadriidae – plovers (69 species)
  - Family Recurvirostridae – stilts, avocets (10 species)
  - Family Ibidorhynchidae – ibisbill
  - Family Haematopodidae – oystercatchers (12 species)
- Suborder Scolopaci
  - Family Rostratulidae – painted-snipes (3 species)
  - Family Jacanidae – jacanas (8 species)
  - Family Pedionomidae – plains-wanderer
  - Family Thinocoridae – seedsnipes (4 species)
  - Family Scolopacidae – sandpipers, snipes (98 species)
- Suborder Lari
  - Family Turnicidae – buttonquails (18 species)
  - Family Dromadidae – crab-plover
  - Family Glareolidae – coursers, pratincoles (17 species)
  - Family Laridae – gulls, terns, skimmers (103 species)
  - Family Stercorariidae – skuas (7 species)
  - Family Alcidae – auks (25 species)

- Charadriiformes
  - Charadrii
    - - Burhinidae – stone-curlews, thick-knees (10 species)
      - - Pluvianellidae – Magellanic plover
        - Chionidae – sheathbills (2 species)
    - - Pluvianidae – Egyptian plover
      - - Charadriidae – plovers (69 species)
        - - Recurvirostridae – stilts, avocets (10 species)
          - - Ibidorhynchidae – ibisbill
            - Haematopodidae – oystercatchers (12 species)
  - - Scolopaci
      - Scolopacidae – sandpipers, snipes (98 species)
      - - - Rostratulidae – painted-snipes (3 species)
          - Jacanidae – jacanas (8 species)
        - - Pedionomidae – plains-wanderer
          - Thinocoridae – seedsnipes (4 species)
    - Lari
      - Turnicidae – buttonquails (18 species)
      - - - Dromadidae – crab-plover
          - Glareolidae – coursers, pratincoles (17 species)
        - - Laridae – gulls, terns, skimmers (103 species)
          - - Stercorariidae – skuas (7 species)
            - Alcidae – auks (25 species)

Phylogeny of the Charadriiformes based a study by Heiner Kuhl and collaborators published in 2020. The families and the number of species are from the list maintained by Frank Gill, Pamela Rasmussen and David Donsker on behalf of the International Ornithologists' Union. The suborders are those defined by Joel Cracraft in 2013.

=== Evolutionary history ===
That the Charadriiformes are an ancient group is also borne out by the fossil record. Alongside the Anseriformes, the Charadriiformes are the only other order of modern bird to have an established fossil record within the late Cretaceous, alongside the other dinosaurs. Much of the Neornithes' fossil record around the Cretaceous–Paleogene extinction event is made up of bits and pieces of birds which resemble this order. In many, this is probably due to convergent evolution brought about by semiaquatic habits. Specimen VI 9901 (López de Bertodano Formation, Late Cretaceous of Vega Island, Antarctica) is probably a basal charadriiform somewhat reminiscent of a thick-knee. However, more complete remains of undisputed charadriiformes are known only from the mid-Paleogene onwards. Present-day orders emerged around the Eocene-Oligocene boundary, roughly 35–30 mya. Basal or unresolved charadriiformes are:

- "Morsoravis" (Late Paleocene/Early Eocene of Jutland, Denmark) - a nomen nudum?
- Jiliniornis (Huadian Middle Eocene of Huadian, China) - charadriid?
- Boutersemia (Early Oligocene of Boutersem, Belgium) - glareolid? jacanid?
- Turnipax (Early Oligocene) - turnicid?
- Elorius (Early Miocene Saint-Gérand-le-Puy, France)
- "Larus" desnoyersii (Early Miocene of SE France) - larid? stercorarid?
- "Larus" pristinus (John Day Early Miocene of Willow Creek, US) - larid?
- Charadriiformes gen. et sp. indet. (Bathans Early/Middle Miocene of Otago, New Zealand) - charadriid? scolopacid?
- Charadriiformes gen. et sp. indet. (Bathans Early/Middle Miocene of Otago, New Zealand) - charadriid? scolopacid?
- Charadriiformes gen. et sp. indet. (Bathans Early/Middle Miocene of Otago, New Zealand) - larid?
- Charadriiformes gen. et sp. indet. (Sajóvölgyi Middle Miocene of Mátraszõlõs, Hungary
- "Totanus" teruelensis (Late Miocene of Los Mansuetos, Spain) - scolopacid? larid?

The "transitional shorebirds" ("Graculavidae") are a generally Mesozoic form taxon formerly believed to constitute the common ancestors of charadriiforms, waterfowl and flamingos. They are now assumed to be mostly basal taxa of the charadriiforms and/or "higher waterbirds", which probably were two distinct lineages 65 mya already, and few if any are still believed to be related to the well-distinct waterfowl. Taxa formerly considered graculavids are:

- Laornithidae - charadriiform? gruiform?
  - Laornis (Late Cretaceous?)
- "Graculavidae"
  - Graculavus (Lance Creek Late Cretaceous - Hornerstown Late Cretaceous/Early Palaeocene) - charadriiform?
  - Palaeotringa (Hornerstown Late Cretaceous?) - charadriiform?
  - Telmatornis (Navesink Late Cretaceous?) - charadriiform? gruiform?
  - Scaniornis - phoenicopteriform?
  - Zhylgaia - presbyornithid?
  - Dakotornis
  - "Graculavidae" gen. et sp. indet. (Gloucester County, US)

Other wader- or gull-like birds incertae sedis, which may or may not be Charadriiformes, are:

- Ceramornis (Lance Creek Late Cretaceous)
- "Cimolopteryx" (Lance Creek Late Cretaceous)
- Palintropus (Lance Creek Late Cretaceous)
- Torotix (Late Cretaceous)
- Volgavis (Early Paleocene of Volgograd, Russia)
- Eupterornis (Paleocene of France)
- Neornithes incerta sedis (Late Paleocene/Early Eocene of Ouled Abdoun Basin, Morocco)
- Fluviatitavis (Early Eocene of Silveirinha, Portugal)

== Evolution of parental care in Charadriiformes ==
Shorebirds pursue a larger diversity of parental care strategies than do most other avian orders. They therefore present an attractive set of examples to support the understanding of the evolution of parental care in avians generally. The ancestral avian most likely had a female parental care system. The shorebird ancestor specifically evolved from a bi-parental care system, yet the species within the clade Scolopacidae evolved from a male parental care system. These transitions might have occurred for several reasons. Brooding density is correlated with male parental care. Male care systems in birds are shown to have a very low breeding density while female care systems in birds have a high breeding density. (Owens 2005). Certain rates of male and female mortality, male and female egg maturation rate, and egg death rate have been associated with particular systems as well. It has also been shown that sex role reversal is motivated by the male-biased adult sex ratio. The reason for such diversity in shorebirds, compared to other birds, has yet to be understood.

== See also ==
- List of Charadriiformes by population
