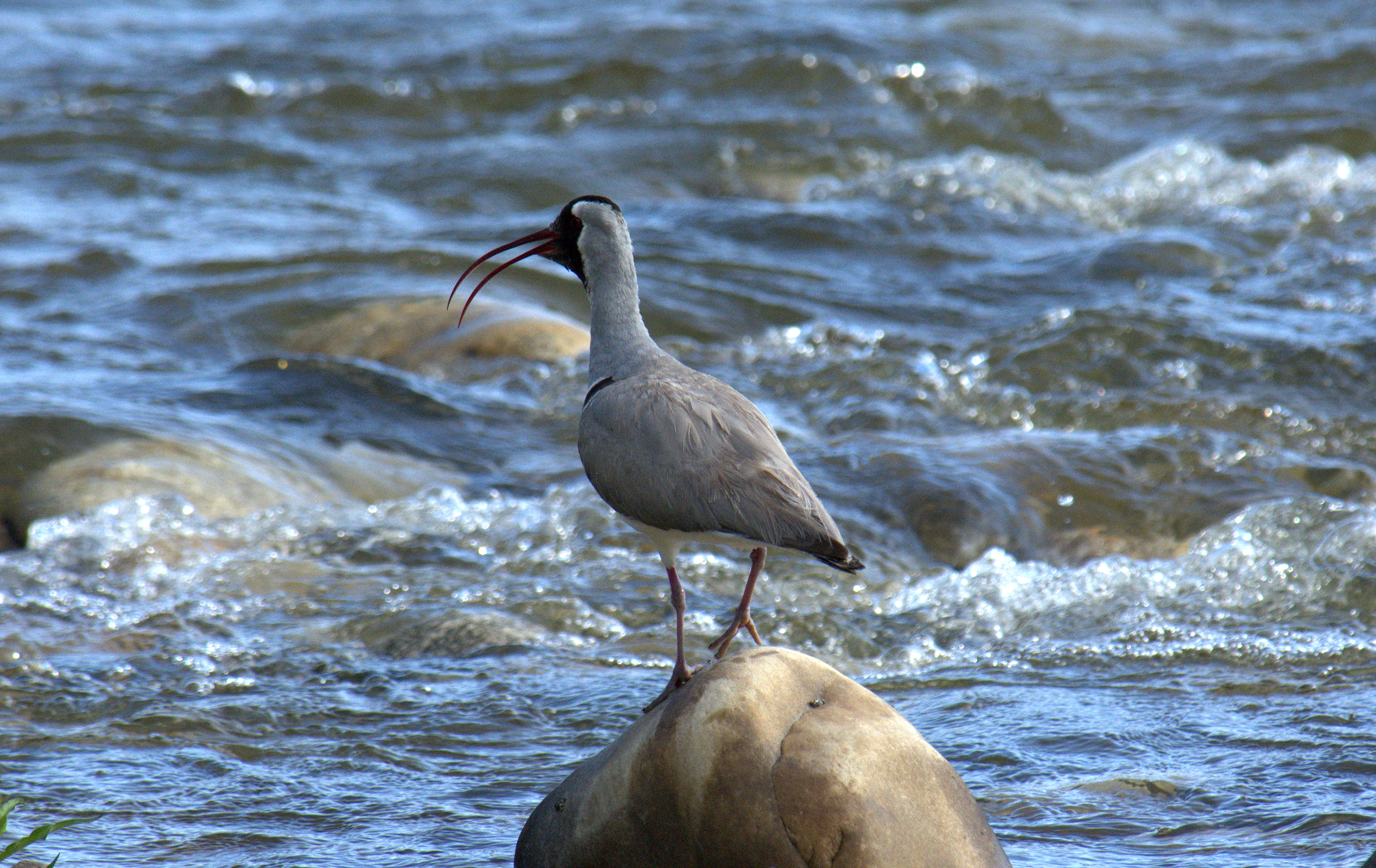

Conservation status
- Least Concern (IUCN 3.1)

Scientific classification
- Kingdom: Animalia
- Phylum: Chordata
- Class: Aves
- Order: Charadriiformes
- Family: Ibidorhynchidae; Bonaparte, 1856
- Genus: Ibidorhyncha; Vigors, 1832
- Species: I. struthersii

Binomial name
- Ibidorhyncha struthersii Vigors, 1832
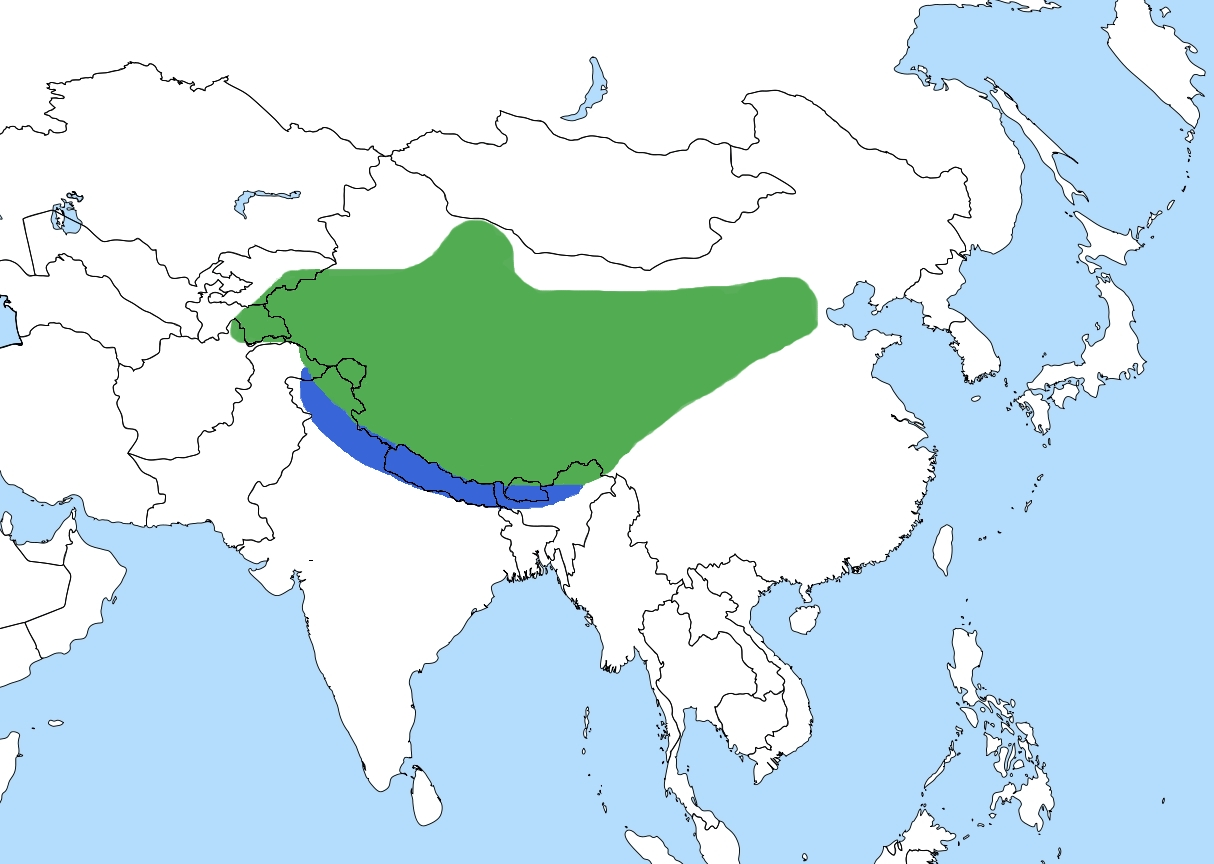

Synonyms
- Clorhynchus strophiatus Hodgson, 1835

= Ibisbill =

Species of bird

The ibisbill (Ibidorhyncha struthersii) is a bird related to the waders, but sufficiently distinctive to merit its own family Ibidorhynchidae. It is grey with a white belly, red legs and long down-curved bill, and a black face and black breast band. It occurs on the shingle riverbanks of the high plateaux of central Asia and the Himalayas.

== Taxonomy ==
The ibisbill belongs to the order Charadriiformes which also includes the sandpipers, plovers, terns, auks, gulls, skuas and others. In its evolutionary relationships, it appears to be most closely related to a group including the oystercatchers (Haematopodidae), and the avocets and stilts (Recurvirostridae), but sufficiently distinctive to merit its own family, Ibidorhynchidae. It is monotypic, with no subspecies. The species was described in 1831 by Vigors based on painting by John Gould, although Brian Hodgson had sent a manuscript to the Asiatic Society of Bengal two years earlier describing it as the "Red-billed Erolia" but this was published only in 1835 with an apology from the editor. Hodgson later suggested a new genus name of Clorhynchus for the bird stating that Gould's description of Ibidorhyncha was inaccurate while Vieillot's Erolia had been rejected. The species is named in honour of a Dr. Struthers who collected specimens of the bird from the Himalayas.

== Description ==
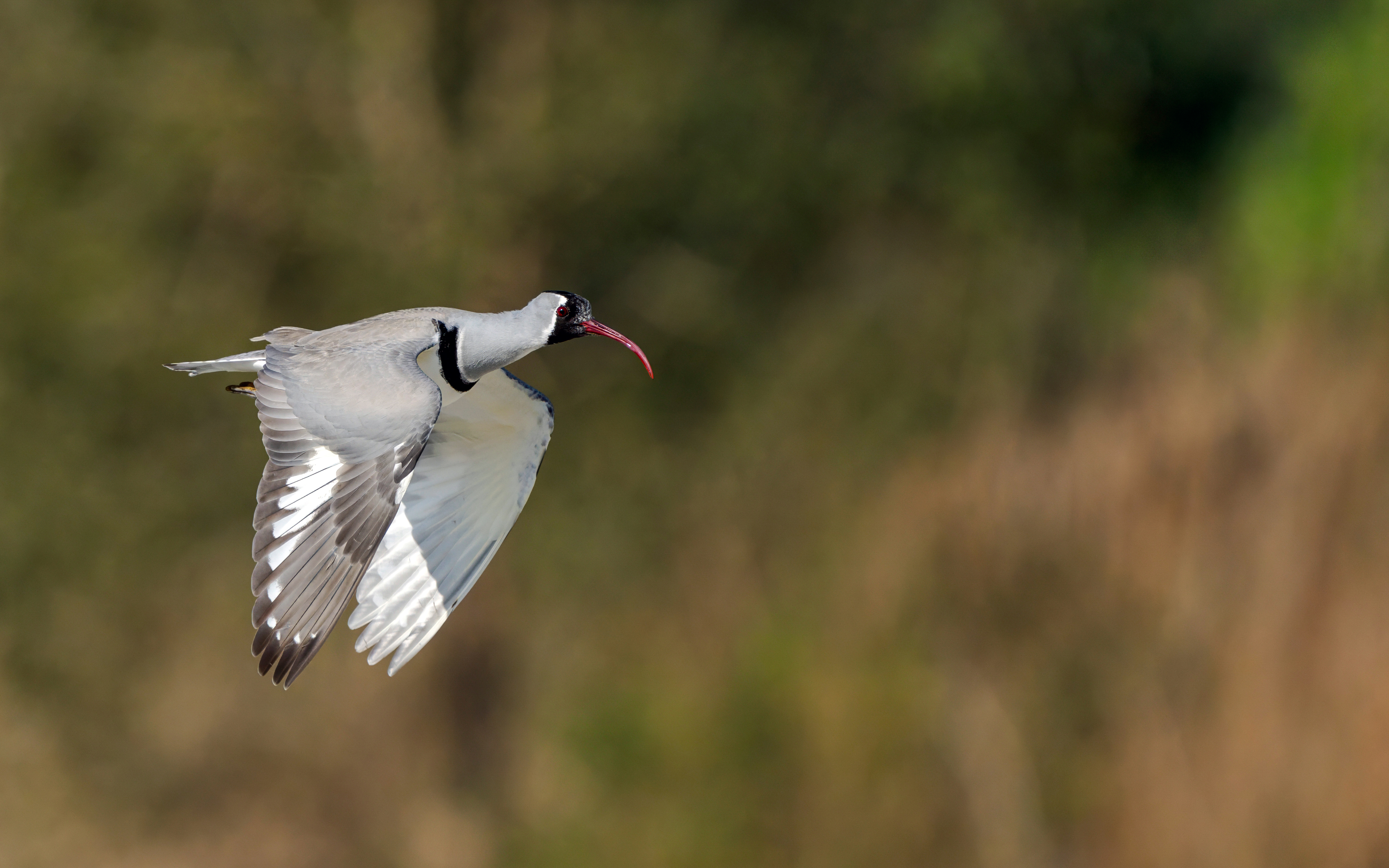
Ibisbill in flight

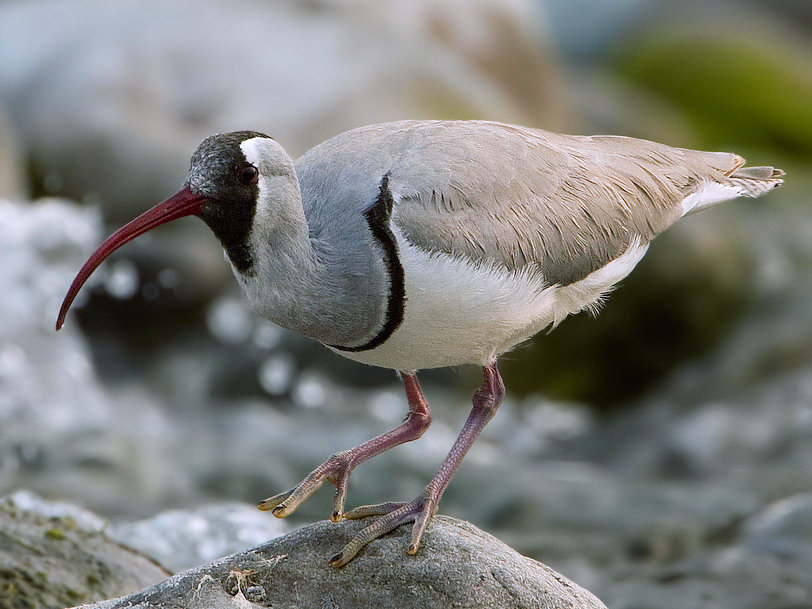
River Kosi, outskirts of Jim Corbett National Park, India

The ibisbill is 38–41 cm (15–16 in) long and is quite unmistakable in appearance. The adult is grey with a white belly, a crimson, long down-curved bill similar to that of the unrelated ibis, and a black face and black breast band. The sexes are similar, but young birds lack the black on the face and breast, and the bill is duller. The bill is 6.8–8.2 cm (2.7–3.2 in) long and is slightly longer in females. The legs are greyish purple in the breeding adults and dull sepia in juveniles or greenish in younger or non-breeding adults. The legs of deceased ibisbills change colour to a crimson similar to the bill shade shortly after death. The tarsi is short and reticulated. The ibisbill has three toes, lacking the hind toe. The outer and middle toes are connected by a small, indented web, while the middle and inner toes possess no webbing. The Ibisbill typically weighs 270–320 g (9.5–11.3 oz) and females weigh slightly more than males. In spite of its spectacular appearance it is inconspicuous in its stony environment. The call is a ringing klew-klew similar to that of a greenshank. In flight, its outstretched neck and rounded wings give an ibis-like appearance.

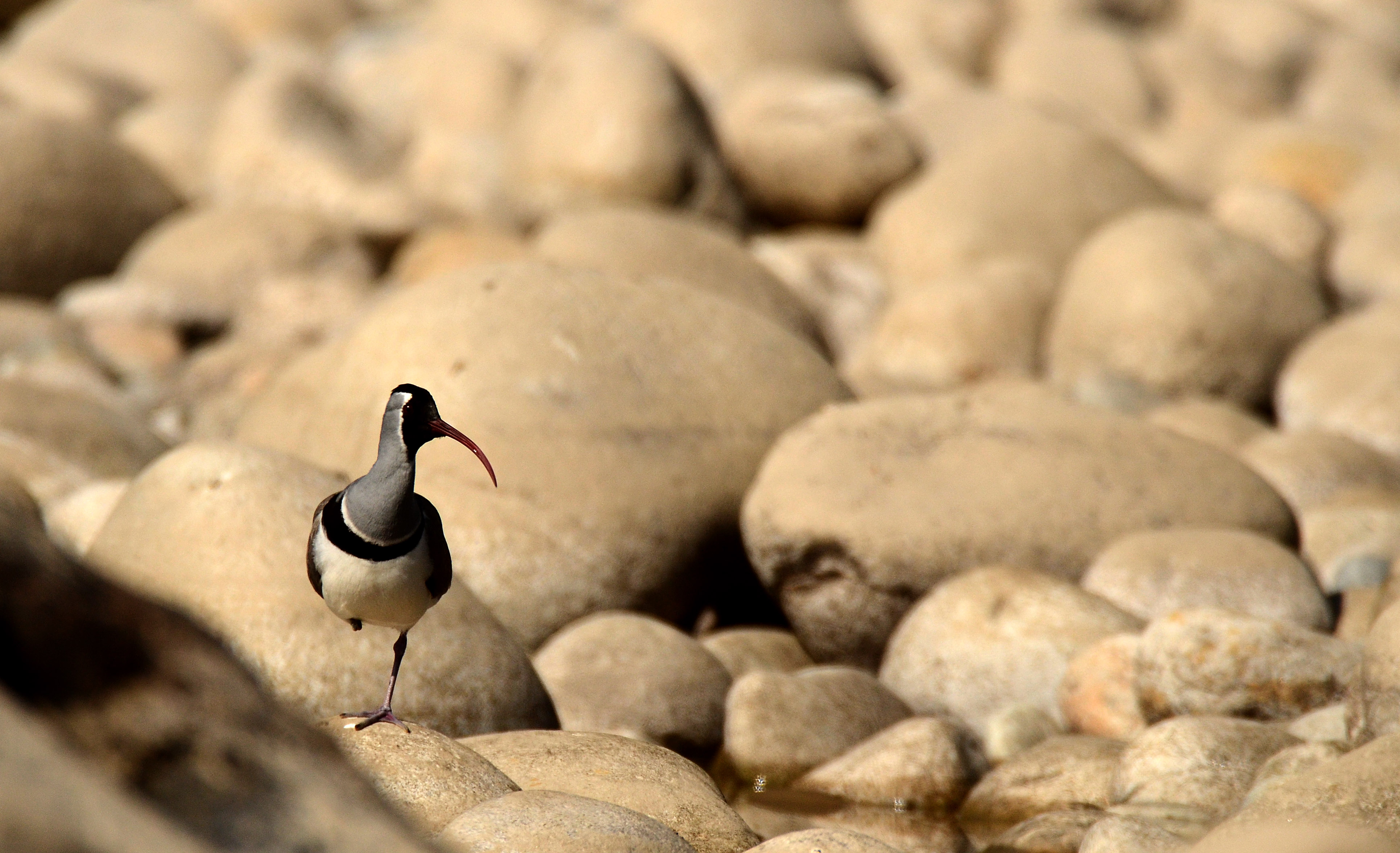
Pochu River, Punakha, Bhutan

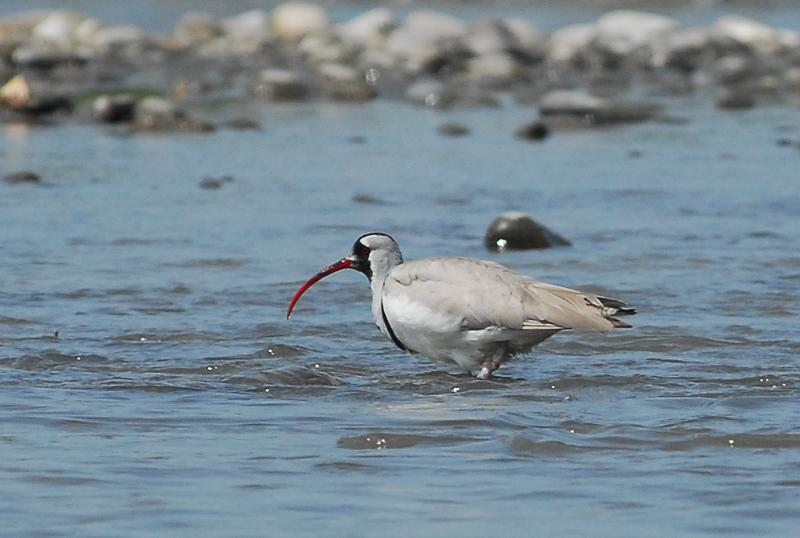
Jia Bhorali River, Nameri National Park, India

== Distribution and habitat ==
The Ibisbills are common in Central Asia and the Himalayas, from Lake Issyk-Kul to the southern border of Manchuria, in Russia in the Altai. They also live in the highlands of the Central and Northern Tien Shan, within Kazakhstan along the valleys of the rivers Bolshaya and Malaya Almatinka, Chilik, Issyk, Karkara, Bayankol, Dzhungar Alatau, Choldysu.

The ibisbill breeds across southern Central Asia along stony riverbeds, typically between 1,700 and 4,400 m (5,600 and 14,400 ft), although there are records of the ibisbill breeding as low as 500 m (1,600 ft). Outside the breeding season, it may descend as low as 100 m (330 ft). It typically is found in shingle-bed river valleys from 100 to 1,500 m (330 to 4,920 ft) across with patches of sand and silt mixed in with pebbles and small boulders. The river valleys frequented by the ibisbill tend to have very little vegetation and gentle slopes to ensure a slow flow of water. It must live near slow-flowing water in order to feed, limiting its habitat despite a large range.

== Behaviour ==
During the autumn and winter, the ibisbill typically is solitary, though they can be found in pairs or in small flocks of up to eight birds. One group of 25 ibisbills has been reported. Ibisbills breed solitarily and are territorial, though limited habitat availability can cause ibisbills to breed while neighboring others. They are generally not shy of humans. They are good swimmers and prefer crossing rivers by swimming instead of flying.

Wintering birds tend to be fairly inactive, while they become more active and noisy as the breeding season approaches.

When scratching the feathers on their head with their toes, they reach from over the wings. This indirect approach pattern is also found in plovers and lapwings but not in stone-plovers and other waders that reach directly from under the wing.

=== Breeding ===
The ibisbill is apparently a monogamous breeder. During the breeding season, the ibisbill is known to run short distances while holding the head down, only standing upright to look at its surroundings. The nest is located on a bank, island or peninsula on the river, and is little more than a scrape on the ground, which may sometimes be lined with small pebbles. Eggs are laid in the end of April and the beginning of May (exact timing varies due to the weather). The clutch size varies from two to four oval eggs. The behaviour of adults near the nest are said to be similar to lapwings. The exact time taken to incubate the eggs is unknown, but both parents share incubation duties. It is suspected that chicks from the previous brood may act as helpers at the nest.

=== Feeding ===
The ibisbill feeds by probing under rocks or gravel on stream beds. It will take a variety of terrestrial and aquatic invertebrates including caddisfly and mayfly larvae that hide under boulders in streams, grasshoppers and also small fish.

== Conservation status ==
This species has a large range, estimated at 5 million square kilometres (1.9 million square miles) which is not believed to declining or fragmentating. Although its population is unknown, it is not thought to be declining. For these reasons the species is evaluated as Least Concern by the IUCN.

== Other sources ==
- Cordeaux, WW (1897) Notes on Ibidorhynchus struthersii. Ibis 7 3(12):563–564.
- Stanford, JK (1935) On the occurrence of the Ibisbill Ibidorhyncha struthersii (Gould) in Upper Burma. J. Bombay Nat. Hist. Soc. 38(2):403–404.
- Bailey, FM (1909) Nesting of the Ibis bill (Ibidorhynchus struthersi). J. Bombay Nat. Hist. Soc. 19(4):993–994.
- Whymper, SL (1910) A breeding ground of the Ibisbill (Ibidorynchus struthersi). J. Bombay Nat. Hist. Soc. 20(2):519–520.
- Whymper, SL (1906) Nesting of the Ibis-bill (Ibidorhynchus struthersi) and the Common Sandpiper (Totanus hypoleucus). J. Bombay Nat. Hist. Soc. 17(2):546–547.
