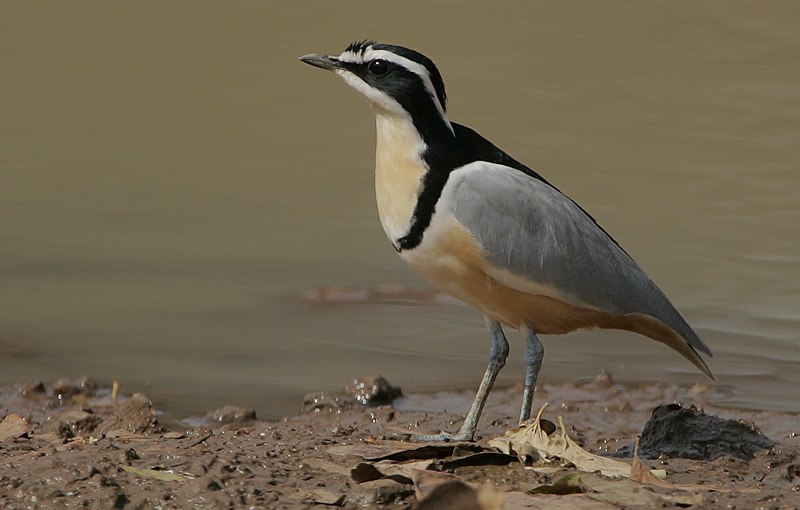
- Kaur Wetlands, the Gambia

Conservation status
- Least Concern (IUCN 3.1)

Scientific classification
- Kingdom: Animalia
- Phylum: Chordata
- Class: Aves
- Order: Charadriiformes
- Family: Pluvianidae; Reichenbach, 1848
- Genus: Pluvianus; Vieillot, 1816
- Species: P. aegyptius

Binomial name
- Pluvianus aegyptius (Linnaeus, 1758)
- Range

Synonyms
- Charadrius aegyptius Linnaeus, 1758

= Egyptian plover =

Species of bird

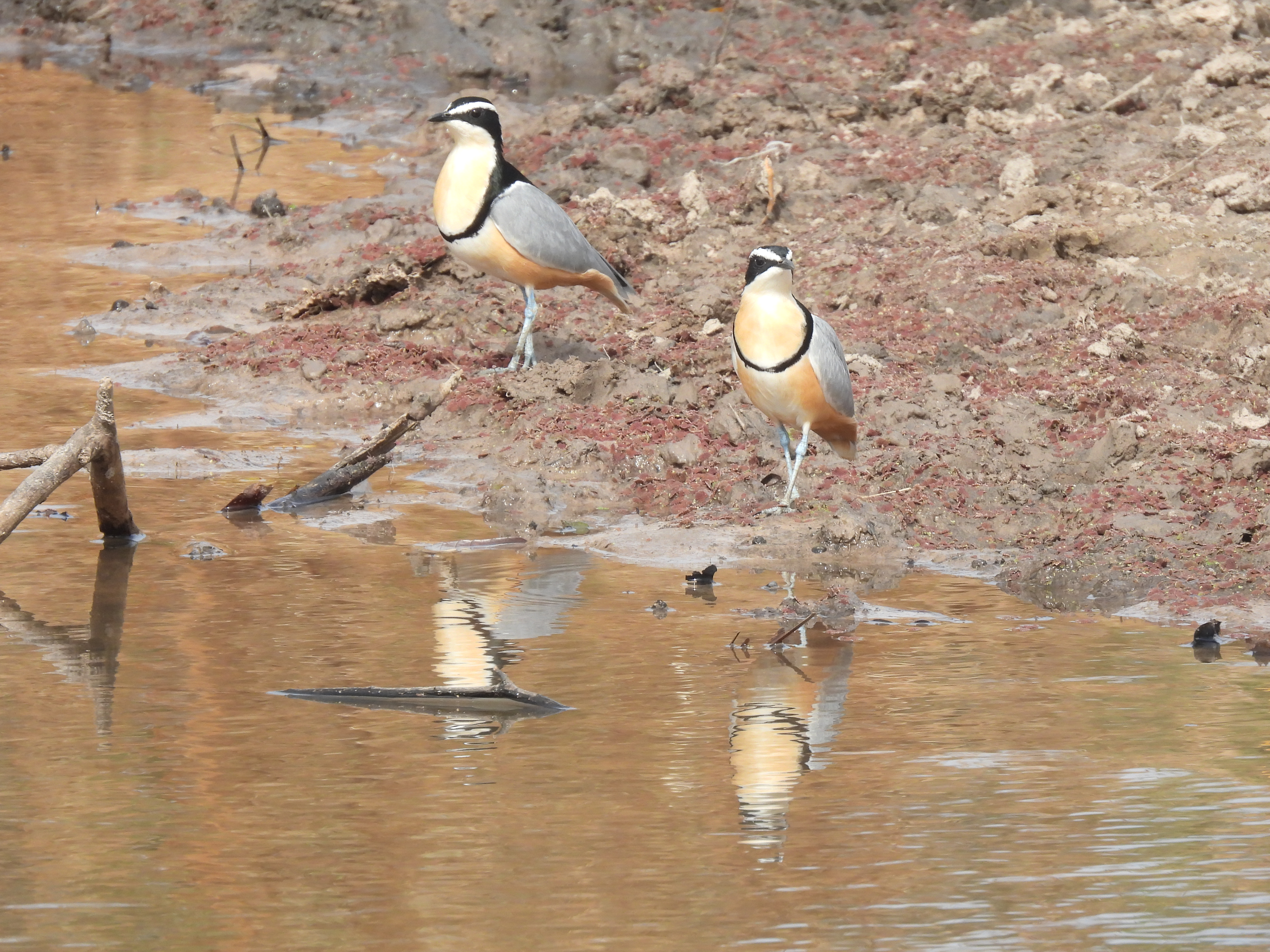
A characteristic pair feeding on the shoreline, The Gambia

The Egyptian plover (Pluvianus aegyptius), also known as the crocodile bird, is a wader, the only member of the genus Pluvianus. It occurs in a band across Sub-Saharan Africa from Senegal in the west to Ethiopia in the east and south to parts of the Democratic Republic of the Congo. Despite the name, it no longer occurs in Egypt. The species was formerly placed with the pratincoles and coursers in the family, Glareolidae, but is now regarded as the sole member of its own monotypic family Pluvianidae.

The species is one of several plovers doubtfully associated with the "trochilus" bird mentioned by the Greek historian Herodotus in a supposed cleaning symbiosis with the Nile crocodile.

== Taxonomy ==
The Egyptian plover was formally described in 1758 by the Swedish naturalist Carl Linnaeus in the tenth edition of his Systema Naturae. He placed it in the genus Charadrius and coined the binomial name Charadrius aegyptius. Linnaeus based his account on the description by the Swedish naturalist Fredrik Hasselqvist that had been published in 1757. The Egyptian plover is now the only species placed in the genus Pluvianus that was introduced in 1816 by the French ornithologist Louis Vieillot. The species was formerly placed with the pratincoles and coursers in the family Glareolidae but beginning in 2007 molecular phylogenetic studies showed that it is not closely related to these species. It was therefore moved to its own family Pluvianidae that had been proposed (as Pluvianinae) in 1848 by the German naturalist Ludwig Reichenbach. The genus name Pluvianus is from the French pluvier meaning plover. This was based on the assumed close relationship with the plovers in the family Charadriidae. Edme-Louis Daubenton used the French name "Pluvian du Sénégal"' for the species in his Planches Enluminées D'Histoire Naturelle that was published between 1765 and 1783. The species is considered to be monotypic, with no subspecies being recognised.

== Description ==
The Egyptian plover is a striking and unmistakable species. The 19–21 cm (7.5–8.3 in) long adult has a black crown, back, eye-mask and breast band. The rest of the head is white. The remaining upperpart plumage is blue-grey, and the underparts are buff. The longish legs are blue-grey. The sexes are similar but juveniles are duller and the black marking are intermixed with brown. There is no seasonal variation.

In flight the black crown and back contrast with the grey of the upperparts and wings. The flight feathers are brilliant white crossed by a black bar. From below, the flying bird is entirely white, apart from the buff belly and black wing bar. The end of the tail has a white band. After landing, members of a pair greet each other by raising their wings in an elaborate ceremony that shows off the black and white markings.

The most frequent vocalisation is a high-pitched krrr-krrr-krrr.

== Distribution and habitat ==
The Egyptian plover is a localised resident in tropical Sub-Saharan Africa from Senegal in the west to Ethiopia in the east and south to parts of the Democratic Republic of the Congo. It breeds on sandbars in large rivers and avoids forested areas. Despite its vernacular and scientific names, it is not present in modern-day Egypt.

== Behaviour and ecology ==
This is relatively tame bird that is found in pairs or small groups near water.

=== Breeding ===
Breeding takes place between early January and the end of March. The nest is a scrape in loose sand on a riverine island. The clutch is usually 3 to 4 eggs which are light yellow-brown with red-brown to grey spots and measure around 32 mm × 24 mm (1.26 in × 0.94 in). The eggs are incubated by both sexes and hatch after 28–31 days. The parent covers the eggs with sand when it leaves the nest. During the hot period of the day the parents wet the feathers of their underparts and then use this water to soak the eggs and the associated covering layer of sand. The chicks are precocial and nidifugous. They are cared for by both parents and can feed themselves independently when around 1 week of age. The fledging period is around 35 days.

=== Food and feeding ===
The Egyptian plover mainly eats invertebrates such as worms, molluscs, aquatic insects and small flies. It picks food from the surface as well as probing with its bill in damp sand. Insects are sometimes caught in the air.

== Supposed relationship with crocodiles ==
The bird is sometimes referred to as the "crocodile bird" based on the belief that the species had a symbiotic relationship with crocodiles. According to Herodotus, the crocodiles lie on the shore with their mouths open and a bird called "Trochilus" flies into the crocodiles' mouths so as to feed on decaying meat lodged between the crocodiles' teeth. The identification of the Trochilus with any particular plover is doubtful and the cleaning symbiosis itself has never been documented by video or photographic evidence. (Note: The image by Warren Photographic showing an Egyptian plover apparently inside the mouth of a Nile crocodile is stated on its website to be "[a] digital reconstruction of [the] popular myth attributed to Herodotus, 5th Century BC. Africa.") (Note: The short video showing seven Egyptian plovers cleaning the mouth of a crocodile is CGI from a bubble gum advertisement)

== Gallery ==
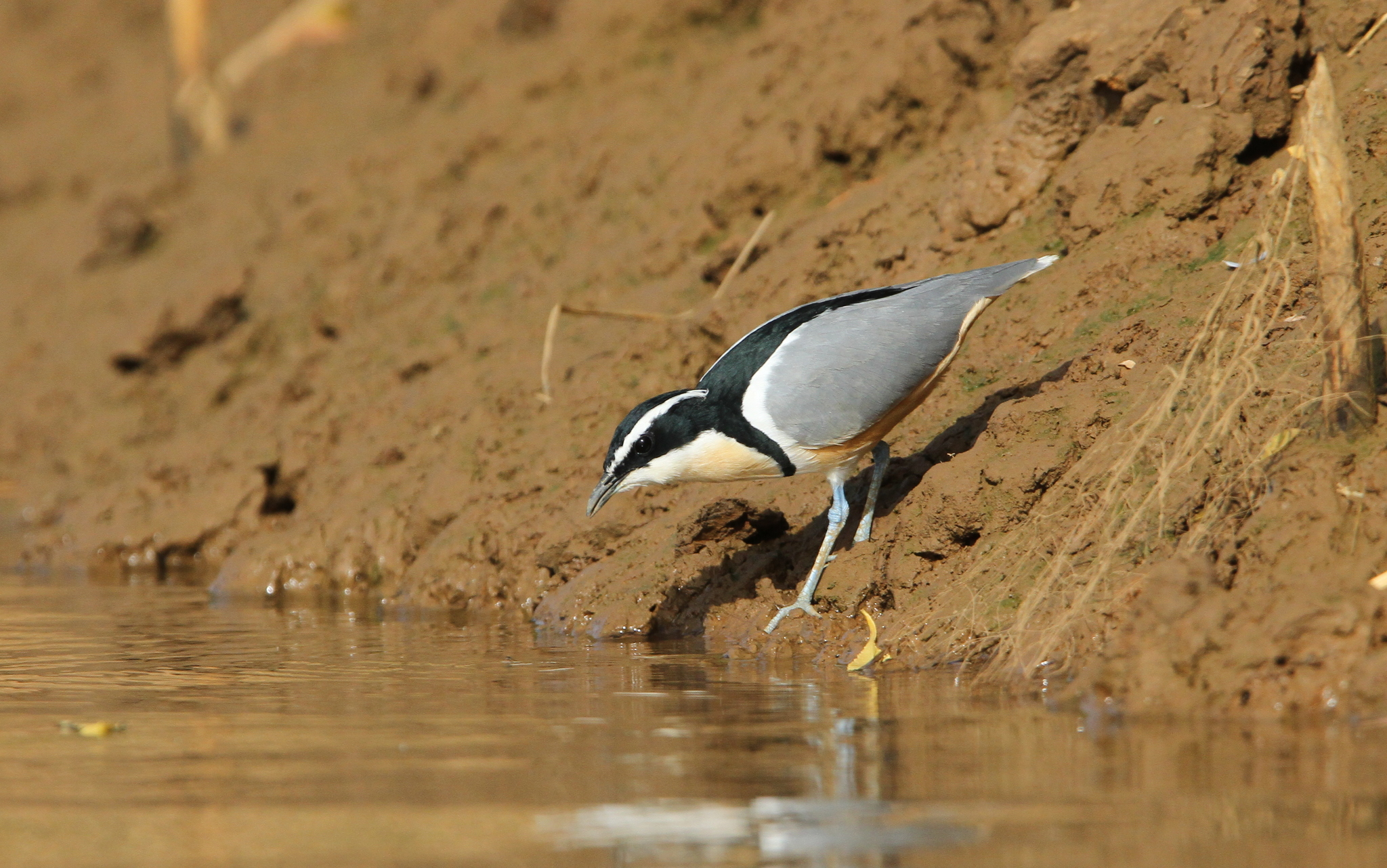
Gambia

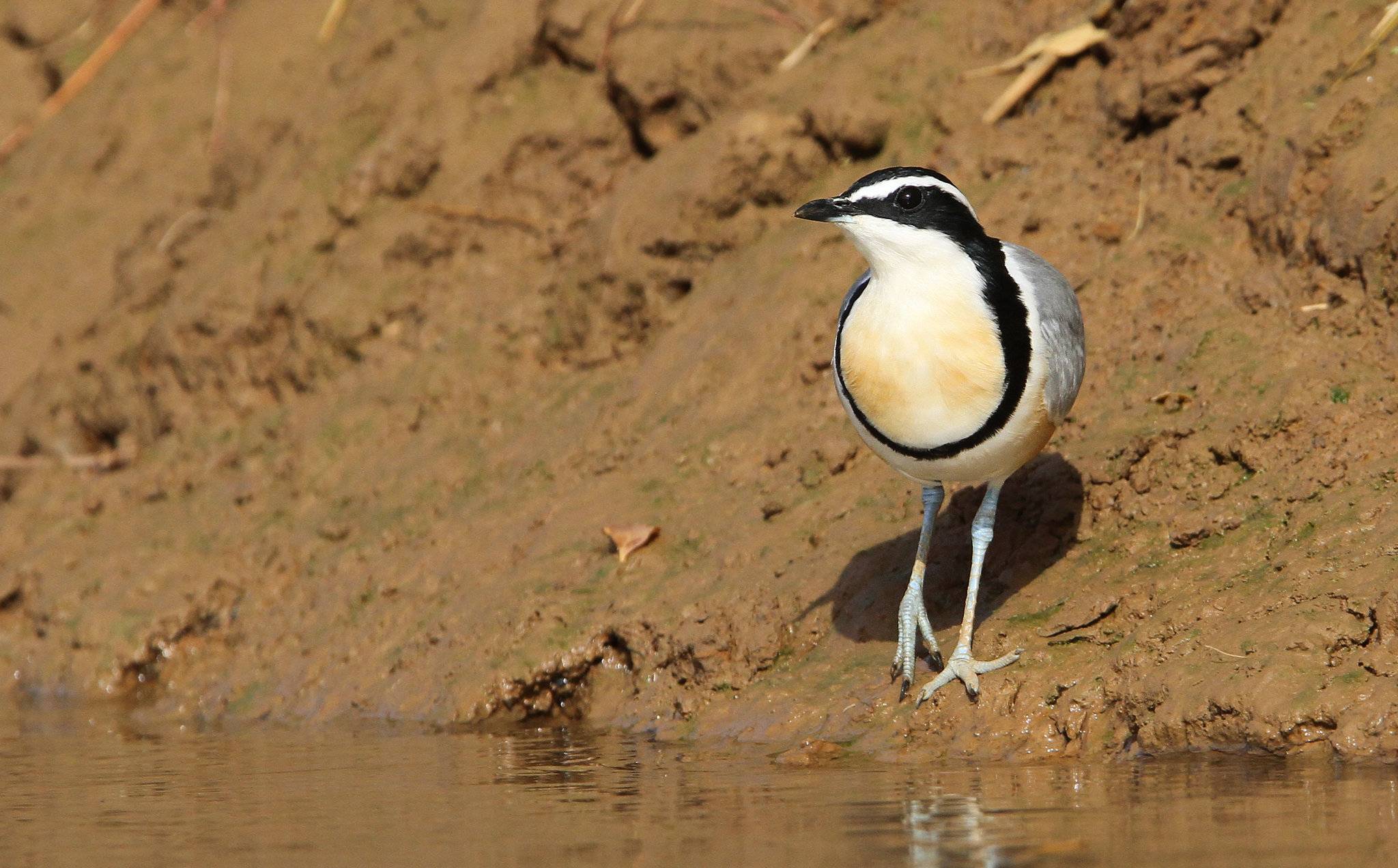
Gambia

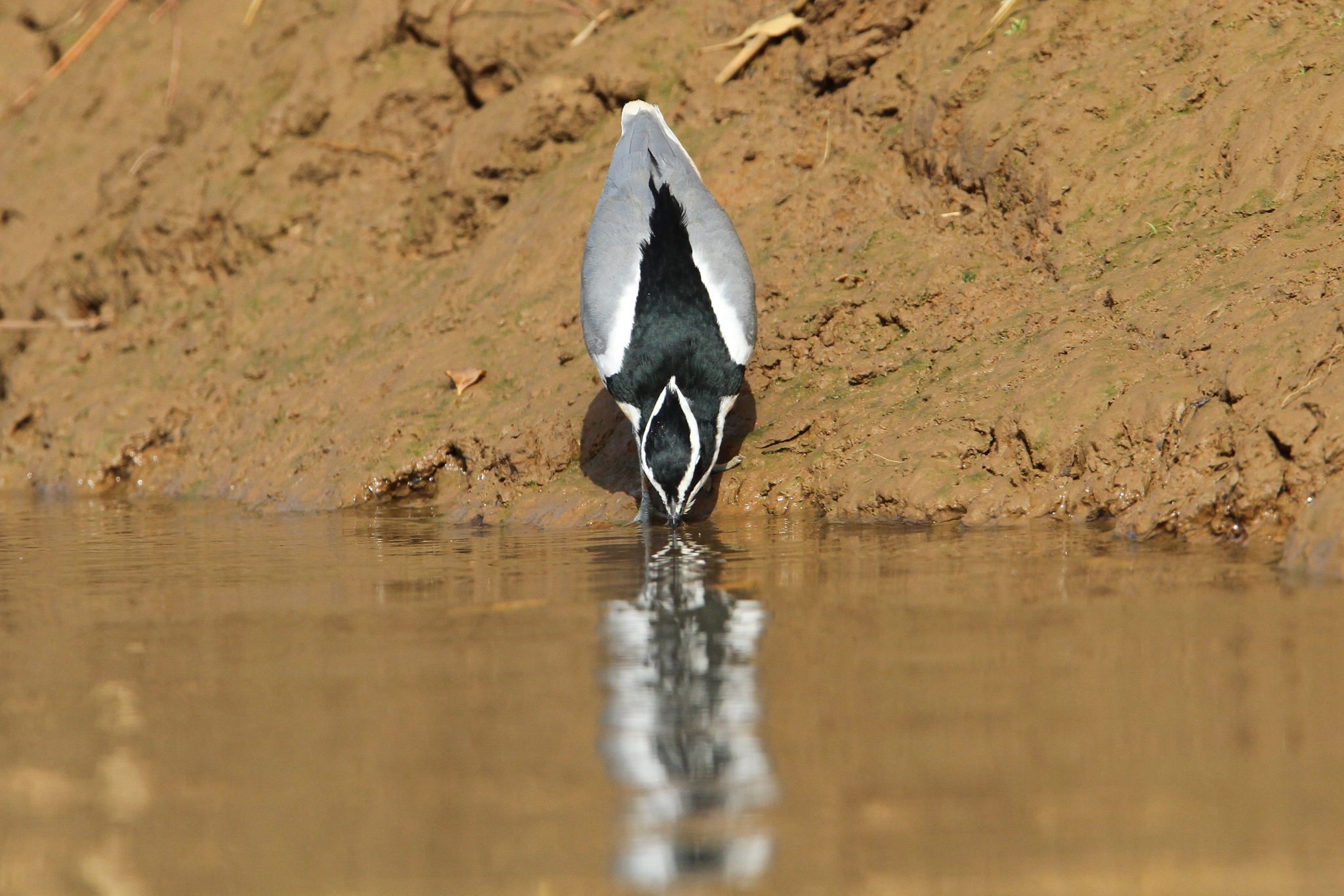
Gambia
