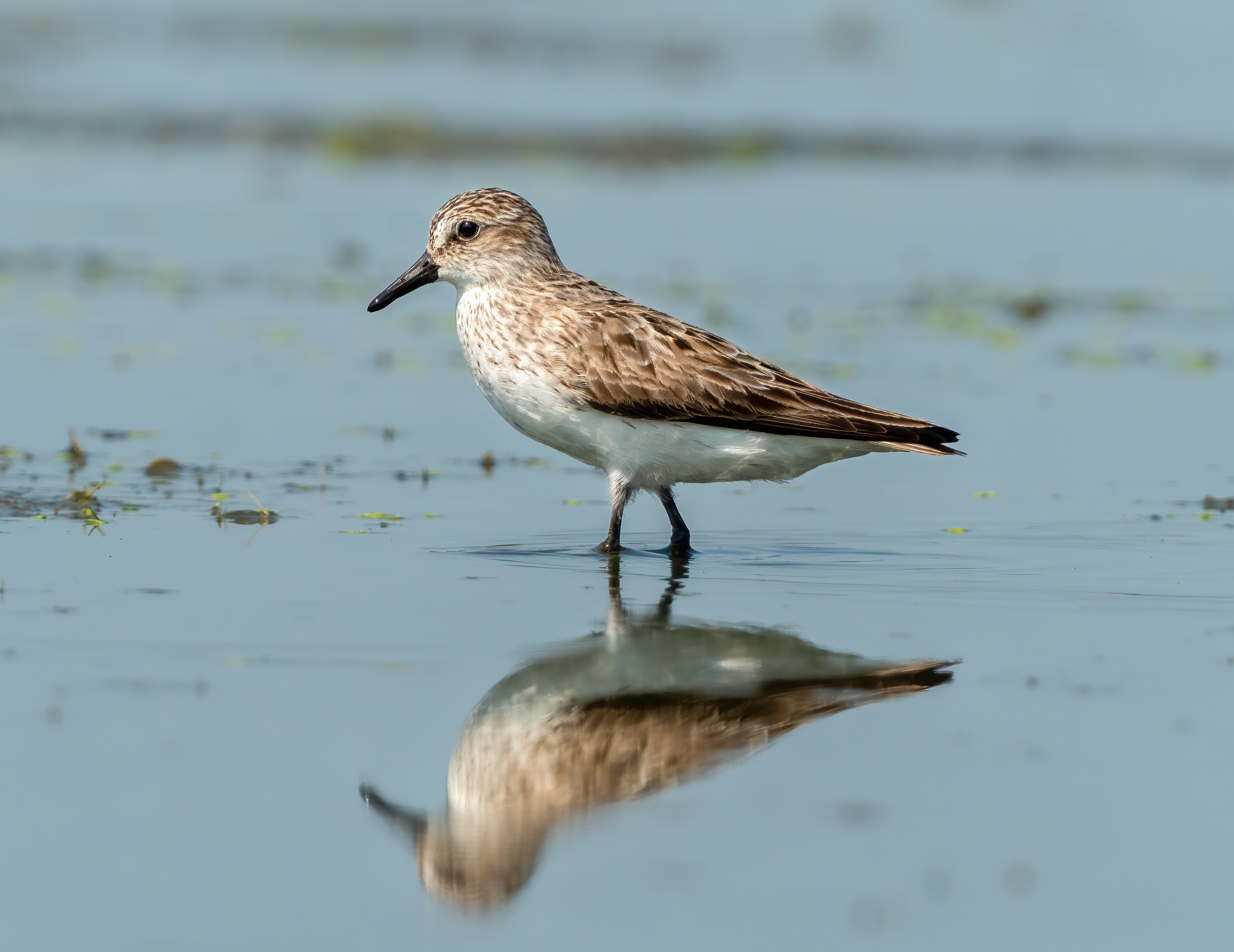
- Semipalmated sandpiper (Calidris pusilla)

Scientific classification
- Kingdom: Animalia
- Phylum: Chordata
- Class: Aves
- Order: Charadriiformes
- Suborder: Charadrii

= Charadrii =

Suborder of birds

Charadrii is a suborder of birds of the Charadriiformes.

== Systematics ==
The family order and number of species are based on AviList v2025.

- Pluvianellidae (Magellanic Plover) — 1 species, 1 genus
- Chionidae (Sheathbills) — 2 species, 1 genus
- Burhinidae (Thick-knees and Stone-curlews) — 10 species, 3 genera
- Pluvianidae (Egyptian Plover) — 1 species, 1 genus
- Recurvirostridae (Stilts and Avocets) — 9 species, 3 genera
- Ibidorhynchidae (Ibisbill) — 1 species, 1 genus
- Haematopodidae (Oystercatchers) — 12 species, 1 genus
- Charadriidae (Plovers and Lapwings) — 69 species, 12 genera
