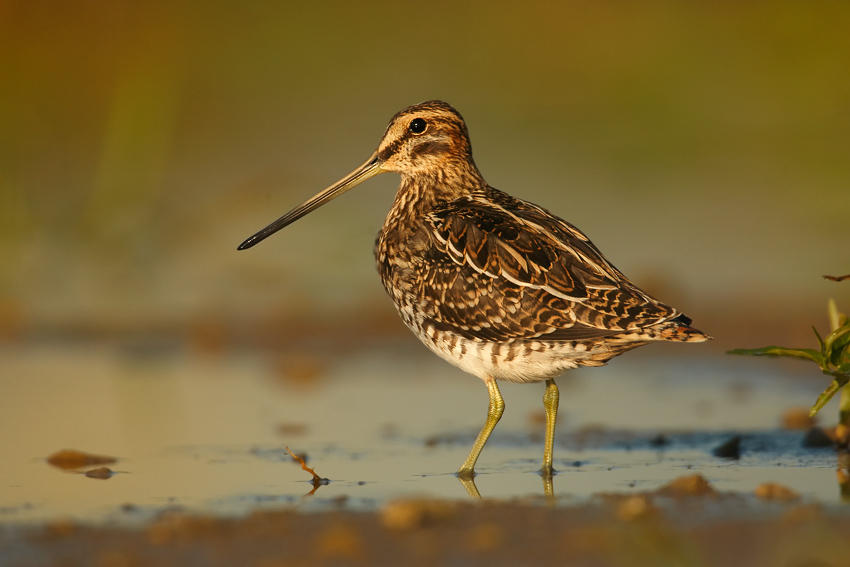
- Gallinago gallinago

Scientific classification
- Kingdom: Animalia
- Phylum: Chordata
- Class: Aves
- Order: Charadriiformes
- Suborder: Scolopaci

= Scolopaci =

Suborder of birds

Scolopaci is a suborder of wading birds within the order Charadriiformes containing the following families:

- Family Rostratulidae – painted-snipes (3 species)
- Family Jacanidae – jacanas (8 species)
- Family Pedionomidae – plains-wanderer
- Family Thinocoridae – seedsnipes (4 species)
- Family Scolopacidae – sandpipers, snipes (98 species)

- Scolopaci
  - - - Rostratulidae (3 species)
      - Jacanidae (8 species)
    - - Pedionomidae
      - Thinocoridae (4 species)
  - Scolopacidae (98 species)

== Ecology ==
Scolopaci occupy a variety of habitats, ranging from wetlands and coastal environments to grasslands and arid uplands. Jacanas are associated with freshwater wetlands, where their elongated toes allow them to move across floating vegetation. By contrast, the South American seedsnipes are predominantly herbivorous birds inhabiting open environments, including the Patagonian steppe and the Andes.

== Fossil record ==
The Paleogene fossil record of Scolopaci consists largely of fragmentary remains, including specimens attributed to Jacanidae from the late Eocene and early Oligocene of Egypt. Additional material has been described from European localities, although the taxonomic affinities of several specimens remain uncertain.

Fossils from the early Miocene deposits of Saint-Gérand-le-Puy, France, document at least six species of Scolopaci. A revision by De Pietri and Mayr recognised several extinct genera, including Scolopacimilis, Parvelorius and Becassius, and highlighted the morphological differences between some fossil representatives and living members of the suborder.
