= Patho Plains Important Bird Area =

Coordinates: 36°07′26″S 144°27′03″E

The Patho Plains Important Bird Area comprises a 794 km^{2} tract of mainly pastoral farmland near the town of Gunbower in north-central Victoria, south-eastern Australia. It contains several relatively small nature conservation reserves as well as the 38 km^{2} Terrick Terrick National Park.

== Description ==
The site encompasses remnants of native grassland inhabited by an endangered grassland bird in a monotypic family – the plains-wanderer – with the intervening farmland. The area has a Mediterranean climate with cool, damp winters and hot dry summers, supporting native tussock grassland dominated by Austrostipa and Austrodanthonia species. Other vegetation types are temperate grassy woodlands dominated by white cypress-pine, grey box and yellow box. There are also small areas of black box riparian woodland and granite outcrop shrubland.

== Birds ==
The site has been identified by BirdLife International as an Important Bird Area (IBA) because it supports most of Victoria's population of plains-wanderers. As well as the land used by the species, the IBA includes extensive areas of unsuitable farmland which has the potential for restoration to habitat suitable for plains-wanderers. It includes an area of woodland which supports the largest regional population of diamond firetails. Birds of prey that breed in the area include spotted harriers and black falcons. Bush stone-curlews and painted honeyeaters have been recorded. The woodland area is important for brown treecreepers, black-chinned honeyeaters, grey-crowned babblers and hooded robins. Inland species near the south-eastern limit of their range include Australian ringnecks, chestnut-crowned babblers and white-winged fairy-wrens.
