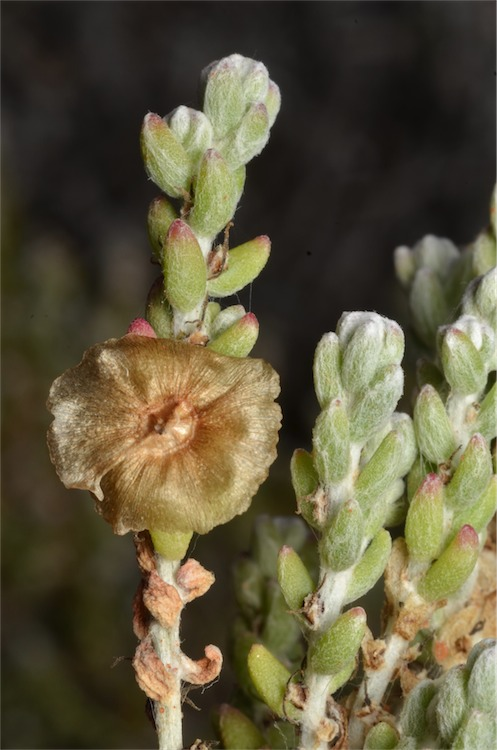
- In Boolcoomatta Reserve

Scientific classification
- Kingdom: Plantae
- Clade: Tracheophytes
- Clade: Angiosperms
- Clade: Eudicots
- Order: Caryophyllales
- Family: Amaranthaceae
- Genus: Maireana
- Species: M. appressa

Binomial name
- Maireana appressa (Benth.) Paul G.Wilson

Synonyms
- Kochia appressa Benth.; Kochia brownii F.Muell. nom. inval.; Kochia brownii Ulbr. nom. inval.; Kochia tomentosa F.Muell.; Kochia tomentosa var. appressa (Benth.) J.M.Black; Mairiana appressa J.W.Green orth. var.

= Maireana appressa =

Grey bluebush

Species of plant

Maireana appressa, commonly known as grey bluebush, is a species of flowering plant in the family Amaranthaceae and is endemic to Australia. It is an intricately branched, spreading or erect shrub covered with woolly, white hairs with narrowly triangular to narrowly oblong leaves, bisexual flowers arranged singly, and a top-shaped fruiting perianth with horizontal wings.

== Description ==
Maireana appressa is an intricately branched, spreading or erect shrub or subshrub that typically grows to 10–60 cm (3.9–23.6 in) high and is covered with loose, woolly white hairs. Its branchlets are sometimes covered with woolly hairs and are often spiny. The leaves are arranged alternately, narrowly triangular or narrowly oblong, 2–5 mm (0.079–0.197 in) long, and covered with woolly hair. The flowers are bisexual, glabrous and arranged singly, the fruiting perianth is usually glabrous with a top-shaped tube 1–2 mm (0.039–0.079 in) long with a papery wing about 10 mm (0.39 in) in diameter. The fruit is a lens-shaped utricle with a radial slit.

== Taxonomy ==
This species was first formally described in 1870 by George Bentham who gave it the name Kochia appressa in his Flora Australiensis. In 1975, Paul Graham Wilson transferred the species to Maireana as M. appressa in the journal Nuytsia. The specific epithet (appressa) means 'appressed'.

== Distribution and habitat ==
Grey bluebush occurs in all mainland states and territories apart from the Australian Capital Territory. It grows near salt lakes, sometimes on breakaways and is widespread in the west of New South Wales, in Queensland, the southern half of the Northern Territory and in the Avon Wheatbelt, Carnarvon, Central Ranges, Coolgardie, Great Sandy Desert, Murchison and Yalgoo bioregions of Western Australia.

== Conservation status ==
Maireana appressa is listed as "not threatened" by the Government of Western Australia Department of Biodiversity, Conservation and Attractions, and as of "least concern" under the Queensland Government Nature Conservation Act 1992.
