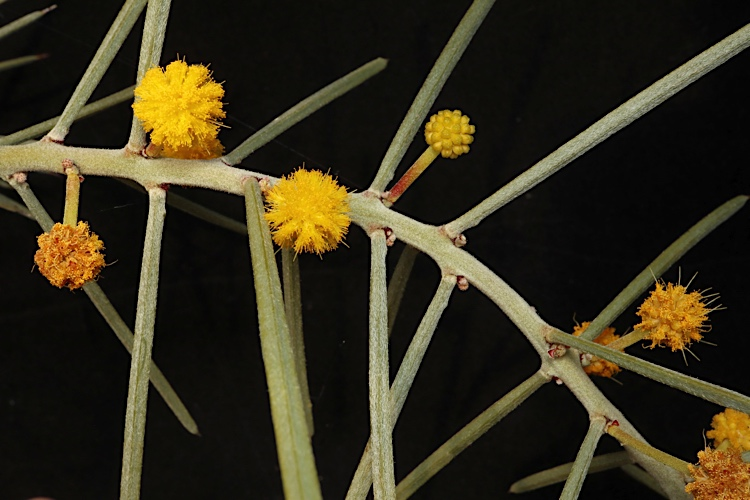
- In the Australian National Botanic Gardens

Conservation status
- Vulnerable (EPBC Act)

Scientific classification
- Kingdom: Plantae
- Clade: Tracheophytes
- Clade: Angiosperms
- Clade: Eudicots
- Clade: Rosids
- Order: Fabales
- Family: Fabaceae
- Subfamily: Caesalpinioideae
- Clade: Mimosoid clade
- Genus: Acacia
- Species: A. carneorum

Binomial name
- Acacia carneorum Maiden
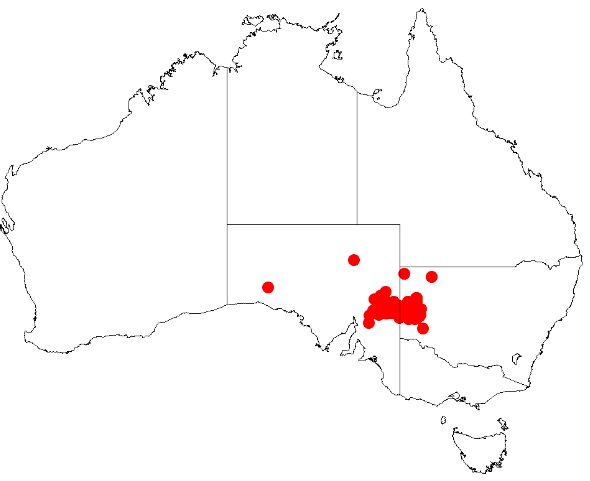
- Occurrence data from AVH

Synonyms
- Acacia carnei Maiden orth. var.; Racosperma carneorum (Maiden) Pedley

= Acacia carneorum =

Purple-wood wattle

Species of plant

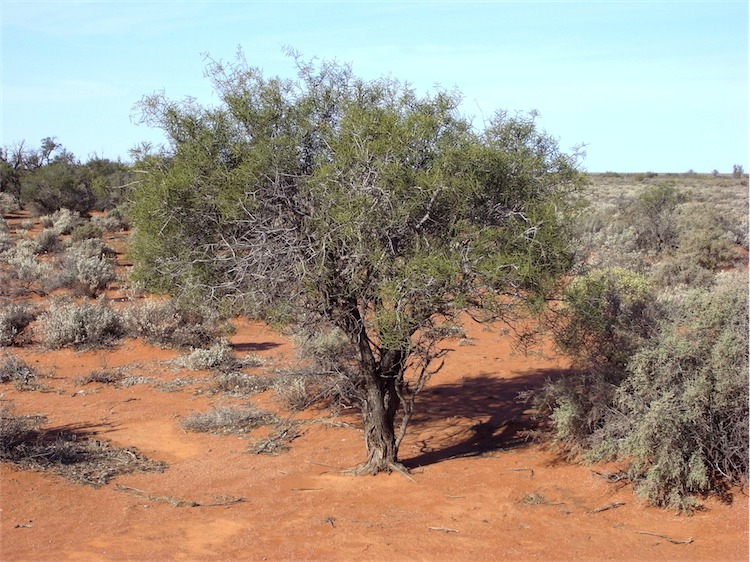
Habit in the Boolcoomatta Reserve

Acacia carneorum, commonly known as needle wattle, dead finish or purple-wood wattle is a species of flowering plant in the family Fabaceae and is endemic to an area near the New South Wales - South Australian border. It is a straggly, spreading shrub or tree with sessile, thick, rigid, sharply-pointed, more or less linear phyllodes, spherical heads of bright yellow flowers, and straight to curved, more or less woody pods.

== Description ==
Acacia carneorum is a straggly dark green shrub or tree that typically grows to a up to 5 m (16 ft) high, 8 m (26 ft) wide, and has a habit similar to some species of Hakea, including H. leucoptera. The branchlets are densely covered with soft, woolly hairs. The phyllodes are sessile, linear, four-sided in cross section, thick, rigid and sharply-pointed, 30–75 mm (1.2–3.0 in) long and 1–2 mm (0.039–0.079 in) wide. The flowers are borne in a single spherical head in axils on a peduncle 8–30 mm (0.31–1.18 in) long, each head with 3 to 60 bright golden yellow flowers. Flowering occurs throughout the year, and the pods are straight to curved, more or less flat, woody and glabrous, 20–50 mm (0.79–1.97 in) long and 8–12 mm (0.31–0.47 in) wide. The seeds are elliptic, about 6 mm (0.24 in) long with a large, yellowish aril.

This species of wattle is known for its deep-purple heartwood, however, once cut and left exposed to air for a few weeks, the purple turns near black. The growth rate is very slow in mature plants, shown through photopoints established through more than 30 years.

== Taxonomy ==
Acacia carneorum was first formally described in 1916 by Joseph Maiden in the Journal and Proceedings of the Royal Society of New South Wales from specimens collected in 1907 near Thackaringa by Joseph Edmund Carne, "22 mi (35 km) from Broken Hill, towards the extreme western part of New South Wales". The specific epithet honours Joseph Carne and his son Walter Mervyn Carne.

== Distribution and habitat ==
Acacia carneorum grows in grassland, woodland and mulga communities in red, sandy soil and near watercourses, in scattered locations between Lake Frome and Peterborough in South Australia and Tibooburra and Menindee Lakes in far western New South Wales.

== Conservation status ==
Needle wattle is listed as "vulnerable" under the Australian Government Environment Protection and Biodiversity Conservation Act 1999, the New South Wales Government Threatened Species Conservation Act 1995 and the South Australian Government National Parks and Wildlife Act 1972.

The main threat to the species is grazing on emerging suckers and soil erosion caused by rabbits, kangaroos and goats grazing on phyllodes, cattle sheltering under the trees and the low viability of seeds.

== Ecology ==
Acacia carneorum is a long-lived perennial that rarely sets seeds but produces new suckers twice a year during autumn and spring growth, independent of root disturbance. It tends to grow in clonal colonies of 20 to 60 and seed viability is low. Carbon dating has found that these plants range from approximately 120 to 330 years of age and this research also found that populations are heavily skewed towards older plants, meaning there has been little or no replacement in these populations since the introduction of grazing animals in the 1860s. Studies from 2010 to 2012 show that most populations continue to produce no fruit.

Needle wattle is commonly associated with Casuarina cristata, C. pauper, Alectryon oleifolius, Atriplex vesicaria, Rhagodia spinescens and Maireana species.
