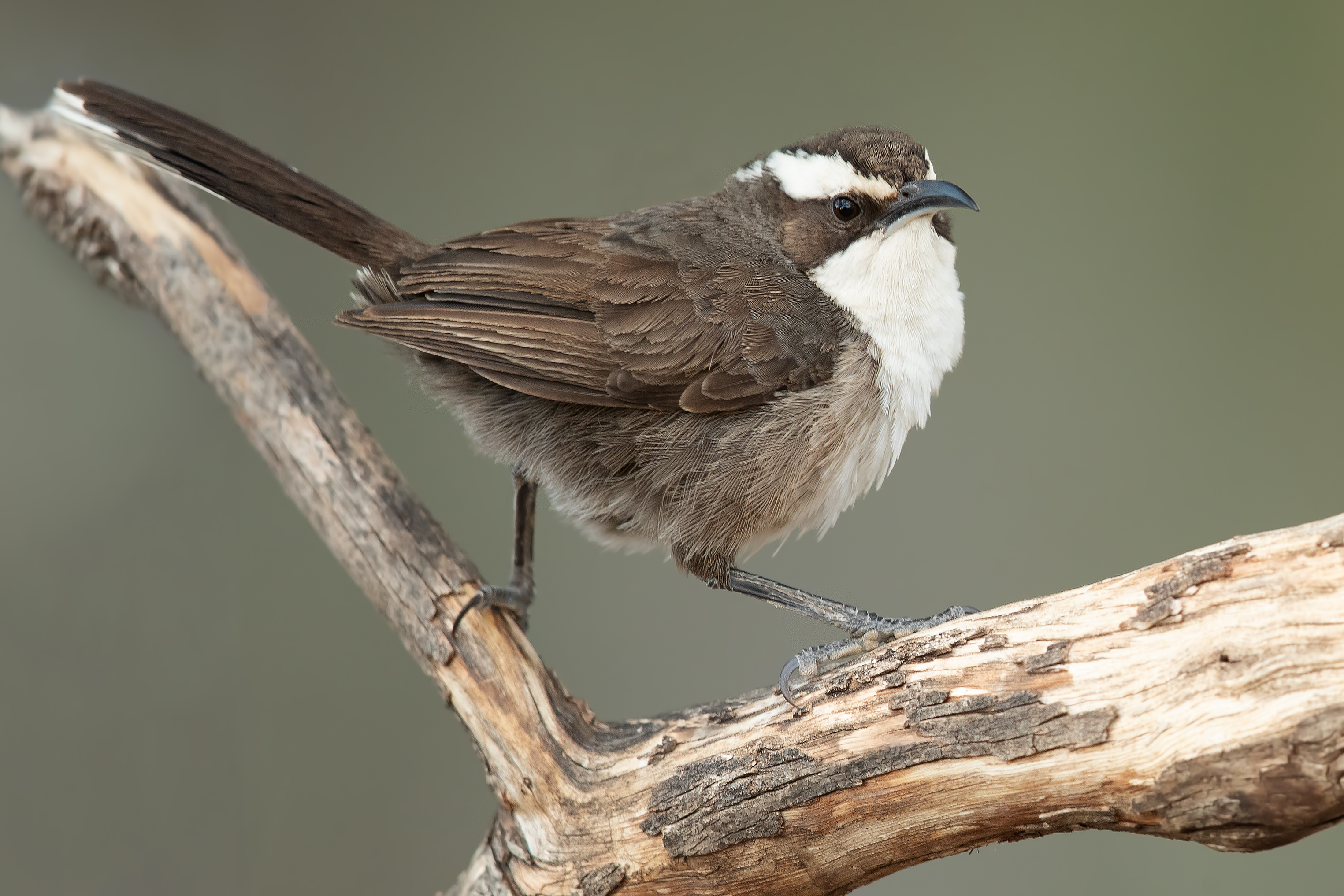
- White-browed babbler Pomatostomus superciliosus.

Scientific classification
- Kingdom: Animalia
- Phylum: Chordata
- Class: Aves
- Order: Passeriformes
- Family: Pomatostomidae; Schodde, 1975
- Genus: Pomatostomus; Cabanis, 1851

Type species
- Pomatorhinus temporalis Vigors & Horsfield, 1827

Species
- Pomatostomus temporalis; Pomatostomus superciliosus; Pomatostomus halli; Pomatostomus ruficeps

= Pomatostomus =

Genus of birds endemic to Australinea

Pomatostomus is a genus of small to medium-sized birds endemic to Australia-New Guinea. All four species are distributed in Australia, and only the grey-crowned babbler could also be found in south New Guinea.

Pomatostomus is the type genus of the family Pomatostomidae. It was the only genus in the family before the Papuan babbler was classified as a separate genus Garritornis.

== Species ==
Image	Scientific name	Common name	Distribution
	Pomatostomus temporalis	Grey-crowned babbler	Australia and southern New Guinea.
	Pomatostomus superciliosus	White-browed babbler	central and southern Australia
	Pomatostomus halli	Hall's babbler	eastern Australia
	Pomatostomus ruficeps	Chestnut-crowned babbler	south-eastern Australia
