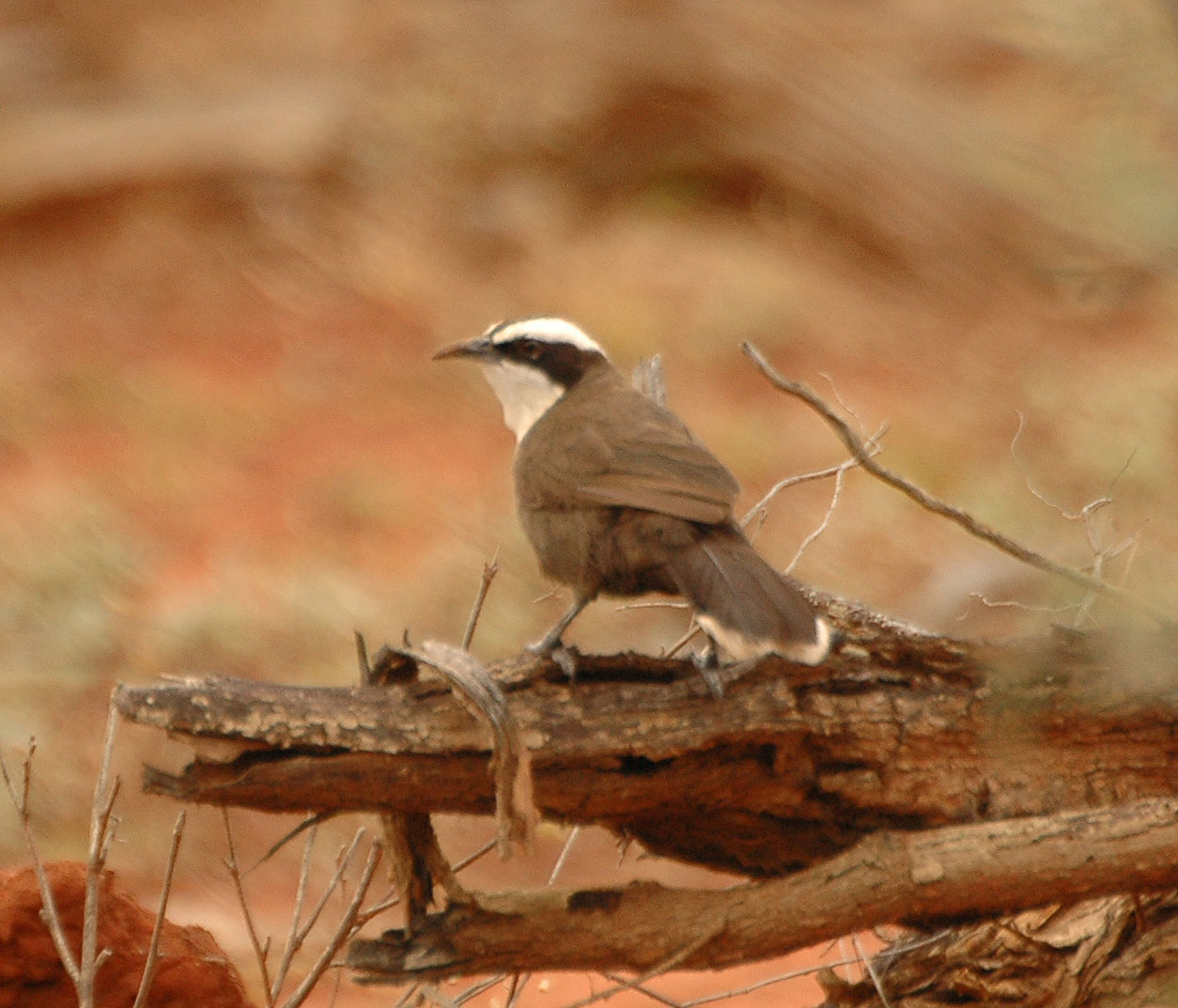

Conservation status
- Least Concern (IUCN 3.1)

Scientific classification
- Kingdom: Animalia
- Phylum: Chordata
- Class: Aves
- Order: Passeriformes
- Family: Pomatostomidae
- Genus: Pomatostomus
- Species: P. halli

Binomial name
- Pomatostomus halli Cowles, 1964

= Hall's babbler =

Species of bird

Hall's babbler (Pomatostomus halli) is a small species of bird in the family Pomatostomidae most commonly found in dry Acacia scrubland in interior regions of eastern Australia. Superficially similar to the white-browed babbler this species was only recognised during the 1960s, which makes it a comparatively recent discovery. The bird is named after the Australian-born philanthropist Major Harold Wesley Hall, who funded a series of expeditions to collect specimens for the British Museum, during which the first specimens of Hall's babbler were collected in southwestern Queensland in 1963.

== Description ==
Hall's babbler is medium in size (19 cm-21 cm) and identified by its thick white eyebrows and a white 'bib' from chin to mid-breast, which is sharply demarcated from the brown lower breast to belly. The tail feathers are tipped white, with the amount of white decreasing from the outermost to innermost feather, where most birds lack white tips on the central pair of feathers; this pattern creates distinctive white 'corners' to the fanned tail, which is conspicuous in flight. The legs and feet are dark grey. The bill is curved and the iris is dark brown. As with other species of Australo-Papuan babbler, Hall's babbler is usually observed in small groups. The species is sexually dimorphic and sexually monochromatic. Juveniles are distinguishable from adults for only a short time after fledging, when they have a shorter all-black and less curved bill and conspicuous yellow rictal flange and palate.

=== Identification ===
There are three other species of Australian babbler which are similar in appearance; The white-browed babbler (Pomatostomus superciliosus), the chestnut-crowned babbler (Pomatostomus ruficeps) and the grey-crowned babbler (Pomatostomus temporalis). The white-browed babbler (Pomatostomus superciliosus) is considered most similar because of its size; however, it can be distinguished by its thinner eyebrows and the lack of a sharp demarcation between the white breast and brown belly (which is diagnostic of Hall's babbler). The chestnut-crowned babbler (Pomatostomus ruficeps) has a distinctive chestnut crown, thinner eyebrows, and white tips to the wing coverts; it also lacks a sharp demarcation between the breast and belly. The considerably larger grey-crowned babbler (Pomatostomus temporalis) also has thick white eyebrows, but a distinctive grey crown and a large rufous patch in the spread wing.

== Distribution and habitat ==
Hall's babbler is found in semi-arid and arid regions of eastern Australia and prefers tall Acacia-dominated shrub lands, usually mulga (Acacia aneura). Occasionally reports are made of sightings in other arid woodlands or arid shrub lands. It has been sighted as far north as Winton and Boulia, as far west as McGregor and Grey Ranges, and south to Mootwingee and Brewarrina and east to Longreach – Idalia National Park – Cunnamulla.

== Behaviour ==
=== Breeding ===
During the breeding season, flocks can be seen reducing in numbers from groups of 15 individuals to pairs with one or more helpers. One of the pair incubates the eggs throughout their development. The domed nest is constructed from twigs and has a side entrance, usually with a short and indistinct entrance tunnel. Commonly found in the outer branches of acacias and in the vertical forks of mulgas and Casuarina. Groups are known to construct several nests, although only one is used for laying eggs. The remaining nests are used for roost sites overnight.

=== Feeding ===
The Hall's babbler is insectivorous and feeds mostly on insects but is also known to consume other invertebrates. They spend most of their time on the ground searching in bark and decomposing timber, occasionally turning over stones. Foraging can occur on the branches of trees if food is available. Flocks tend to stay together as they move between feeding grounds and will form a tight unit when searching an area. The name 'babbler' may have come from the constant communication between groups as they forage.

=== Voice ===
The calls consist of constant 'clucks' while foraging, and an alarm call which sounds more like a loud buzzing, usually resulting in flocks retreating to the cover of trees.

== Status and conservation ==
- Commonwealth status: not listed
- State of New South Wales: vulnerable
- State of Queensland: least concern

Threats include habitat loss through clearing, habitat degradation through pastoralism and potentially predation by foxes and cats.

Recovery recommendations include:

- Reduce stock intensity or exclude grazing in some areas to allow vegetation to recover
- Retention of grasslands, including the full cycle of grass development such as seed set and tussock formation
- Retention of understory shrubs continuing to complete their life cycle
- Prevent the clearing of habitat
- Control foxes, feral cats, rabbits and feral goats

== Other research ==
- The Relationship of Habitat Quality to Group Size in Hall's Babbler
- Morphology and Development of Nestling Grey-crowned and Hall's Babblers.
- Cryptic differentiation and geographic variation in genetic diversity of Hall's Babbler.
