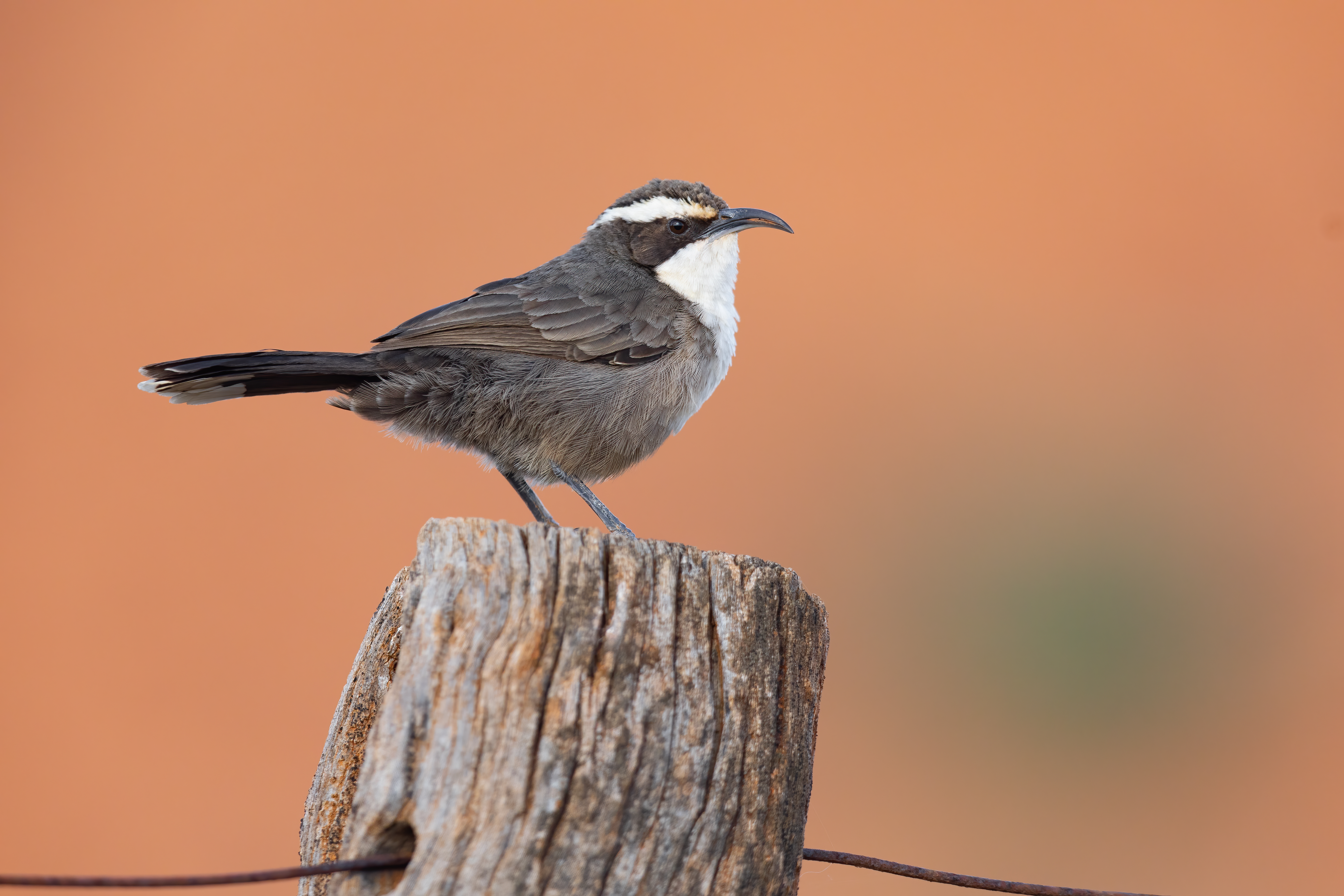

Conservation status
- Least Concern (IUCN 3.1)

Scientific classification
- Kingdom: Animalia
- Phylum: Chordata
- Class: Aves
- Order: Passeriformes
- Family: Pomatostomidae
- Genus: Pomatostomus
- Species: P. superciliosus

Binomial name
- Pomatostomus superciliosus (Vigors & Horsfield, 1827)

= White-browed babbler =

Species of bird

The white-browed babbler (Pomatostomus superciliosus) is a small, gregarious species of bird in the family Pomatostomidae. They are endemic to the open woodlands and shrubby areas of central and southern Australia. The Latin name superciliosus refers to the supercilium, or 'eyebrow', which is a feature synonymous with the pomatostomine babblers (Hall's babbler, chestnut-crowned babbler, grey-crowned babbler, and white-browed babbler).

== Description ==
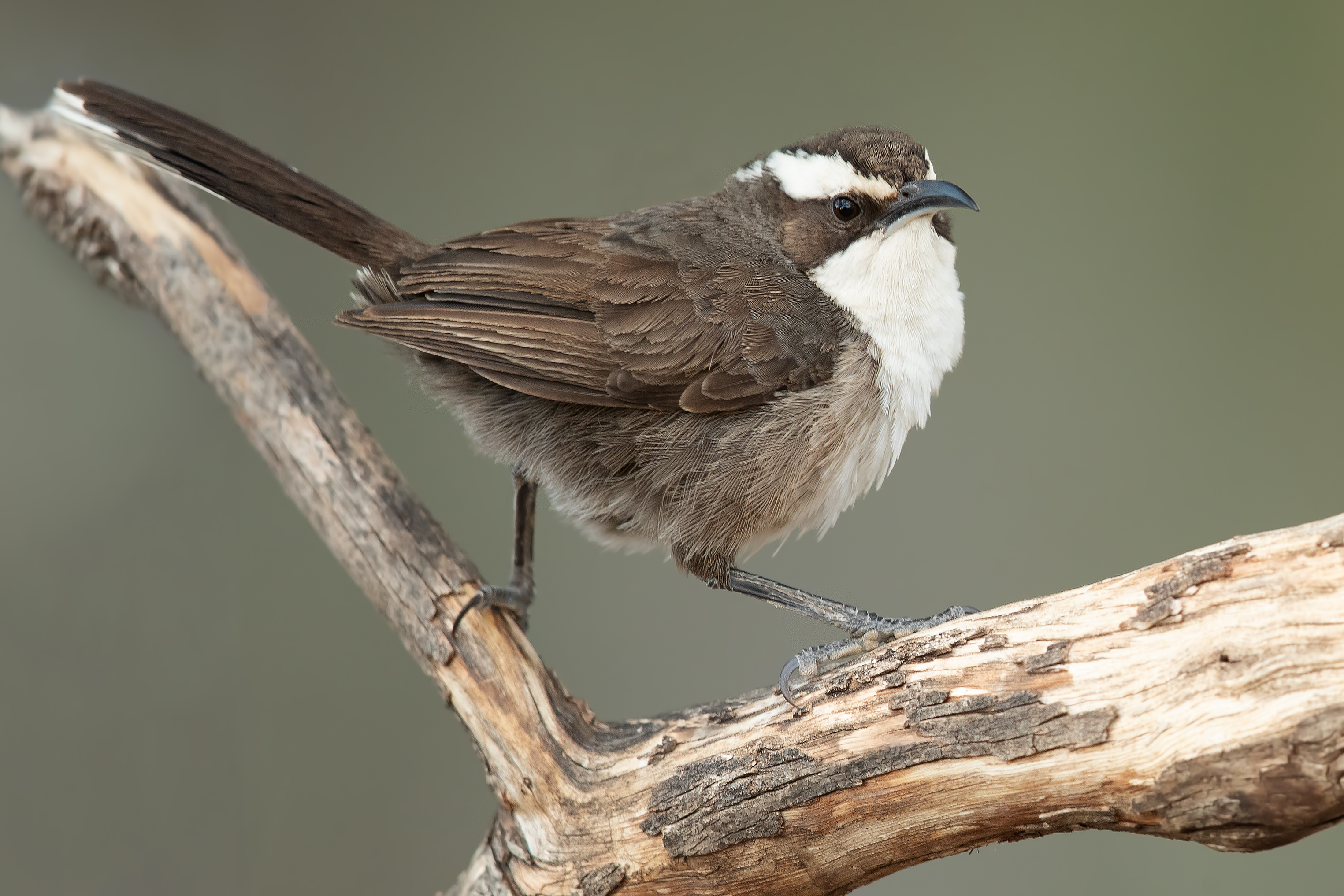
White-browed babbler

Ranging from 17 cm to 21 cm in length, the white-browed babbler is the smallest of the Australian babblers. It is a medium-sized terrestrial bird with a long and decurved bill. The wings are short and rounded in shape, adjacent to a plump, full body which is similar but slightly smaller than the chestnut-crowned or Hall's babbler. The tail is long and graduated, ending with a rounded tip. The gregarious nature of this species means that the tail is often fanned, raised, or a mix of the two. There are many variations to colour; however, the adult babbler generally varies from a dark grey-brown to solid dark brown with distinguished white supercilium and dark brown eye stripe. The underside is usually lighter in colour, varying from light grey or white to light brown; sometimes lighter for females, but generally sexes are similar. Juveniles often have more pronounced dark plumage with a chestnut or cinnamon motif, especially on the underside. Breeding adult males may sometimes have a more pronounced brown 'cap' compared to females or juveniles.

=== Similar species ===
Hall's babbler is the species most often confused with the white-browed babbler because of their similarity in size. The two can best be distinguished by comparing the supercilium. Hall's babbler has a narrow and very dark brown crown-stripe with a much broader, vivid white supercilium. Secondly, Hall's babbler does not have a 'fading' eye-stripe towards the rear of the head, where there is more chestnut brown coloration. Individuals will have vivid coloration on the face and will never have a white dot under the eye, which is sometimes present in the white-browed babbler. The tail will also have a square edge rather than a round edge, which the white-browed babbler would have; however, this feature is sometimes not as reliable in juveniles.

Chestnut-crowned babblers are most easily defined by the colour of their cap and wing patterns. They have a much lighter 'chestnut'-colored c cap and distinct double white wing-bars across coverts.

The grey-crowned babbler is significantly larger than its white-browed counterpart. Their size means that to conserve energy, their wing beat pattern changes to more sporadic flapping and gliding rather than even and fast wing beats.

== Habitat ==
The habitat for the white-browed babbler varies across the southern regions of Australia, from dry sclerophyll woodlands, shrublands, heathland, semiarid grasslands and open forests. They prefer areas with a dense understory of shrubs or spinifex for protection and nesting. Their range extends through arid and semiarid areas all the way across the South Australian coastline to Western Australia, and by doing so, it crosses many different ecological vegetation classes (EVCs). No preference seems to be shown with the overall composition of habitat, only that when the understory provides good quality protection from the environment and predators, the species is more successful. Populations have been found in many locations across southern Australia, including dry, rocky gibber desert, mulga, eucalyptusor acacia woodlands Studies have also found many populations in and around human-related infrastructure (see below).

Babblers spend the majority of their time foraging through leaf litter on the ground, although during nesting periods they retreat to nests inside hollowed logs, grass clumps, fallen branches or shrubs.

== Distribution ==
Populations of white-browed babbler live throughout the southern mainland of Australia. Generally, they are located south of the tropic of Capricorn from the east-to-west coast of Australia. The populations that exist in the central areas of Australia tend to be more isolated than those nearer to the coastline.

== Behaviour ==
=== Breeding ===
Breeding is widespread throughout the year and across distribution; it depends mostly on environmental conditions. During drought, breeding is less prevalent, or the number of eggs laid can be reduced from four or five to two. Co-operative breeding is common within this species. This is when groups of between two and four breeding pairs and various other individuals form a breeding community, which take turns incubating eggs and repairing nests. Incubation takes around 19 days, followed by a further 20 days developing in the nest.

Breeding pairs are usually monogamous, even though co-operative breeding takes place. Pairs spend almost the entire year in close proximity, preening each other regularly and working in unison to defend territory or feed together. Prospective males perch next to females facing the same direction and begin a loud chatter, jumping from one side of female to the other and then fluttering their wings with their head thrown back. Females then mimic the chatter and wing fluttering. Usually this occurs from late August to mid-September, although can occur at other times before breeding.

Nests are dome-like in shape with a hooded entrance, usually made from small sticks from surrounding environment. Some nests in colder areas have been found to be lined with soft, scavenged furs. On some occasions, they build two nests, one for roosting and the other for brooding; in other words, one for resting and the other for raising young.

=== Feeding and diet ===
The diet of the white-browed babbler varies depending on the area that they live in and the availability of food sources. Insects, spiders, amphibians, crustaceans, reptiles, fruit, seeds and nuts have been found to be part of their diet, most commonly varieties of these which can be found on the ground where they spend the majority of their time. Adult feeding individuals have a log or branch from which they hide in and return, rarely venturing from their nest or feeding areas that are known to them. Juveniles without partners tend to be more adventurous while feeding or searching for partners, although they still move between safe areas.

=== Voice ===
The most common call heard is a low repeated 'chuck' call, which is thought to be a contact call while foraging. The long-distance call consists of chattering 'mee' sounds repeated three or more times, followed by whistled 'wee-aw' which rises in pitch. As the name suggests, this may be used for communication over long distances with individuals removed from the group; it tends to be much louder than other calls.

When a group is in distress, they all form a chorus of 'churring' sounds. This, combined with moving from perch to perch, seems to communicate danger and serves as an alarm. There have been studies that suggest that varying numbers of these calls or the speed of them suggest varying levels of danger.

== Threats and human interactions ==
Threats to the species are generally associated with habitat clearing and fragmentation from expanding agriculture and forestry. The most prevalent areas of agriculture are in the Western Australian wheat belt area, where land clearing has led to highly disconnected vegetation. Forestry and extensive bushfires in Victoria are responsible for widespread clearing of remnant vegetation.

Pressure from predation also occurs from introduced species such as cats and foxes. These species, among others, have a complex and widespread effect on the ecosystem. Models that predict the effects of these species suggest that they could affect the numbers of native birds in the long term.

Some studies have found nesting sites on roadsides, golf courses, orchards, agricultural areas and buildings. Other studies indicate that anywhere that understory and groundcover were dense or protection was offered, there were likely to be higher densities of white-browed babbler.

== Status and conservation ==
- Commonwealth status: Not listed
- State of Victoria: least concern
- State of South Australia: least concern
- State of Western Australia: least concern

Given the large range of the species, the IUCN has deemed that the population of white-browed babblers in Australia does not approach the thresholds for vulnerability under the range size criterion. The size and density have generally been in decline since the 1970s, although the rate at which this is occurring suggests that there is little need for concern for the species.

Given that the persistence of the species is of little concern, there are no conservation efforts tailored specifically for it; however, there is significant decline of other species in the ecosystems which the white-browed babbler inhabits. Many of these studies suggest that remnant vegetation is integral to the health of these ecosystems and that their removal can cause higher levels of competition in an area. This leads to interspecies competition for remnant vegetation and the species that rely on it decline in number. Others suggest that the generalist style of feeding is best suited to these degraded landscapes, and therefore the white-browed babbler is least susceptible to degraded conditions.

== Also known as ==
White-eyebrowed babbler, white-browed chatterer, white-browed chatterer, cackler, catbird, chatterer, go-always, happy family, hopping dick, hopping jenny, jumper, kangaroo bird, stickbird and yahoo.
