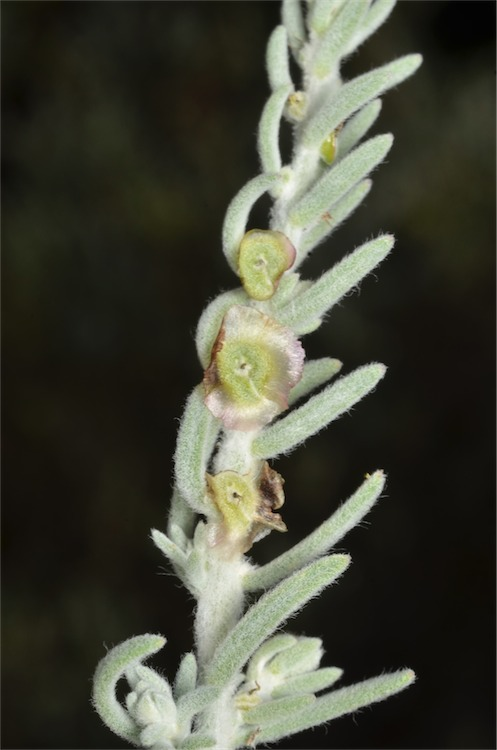

Scientific classification
- Kingdom: Plantae
- Clade: Tracheophytes
- Clade: Angiosperms
- Clade: Eudicots
- Order: Caryophyllales
- Family: Amaranthaceae
- Genus: Maireana
- Species: M. integra

Binomial name
- Maireana integra (Paul G.Wilson) Paul G.Wilson

Synonyms
- Kochia integra Paul G.Wilson

= Maireana integra =

Species of plant

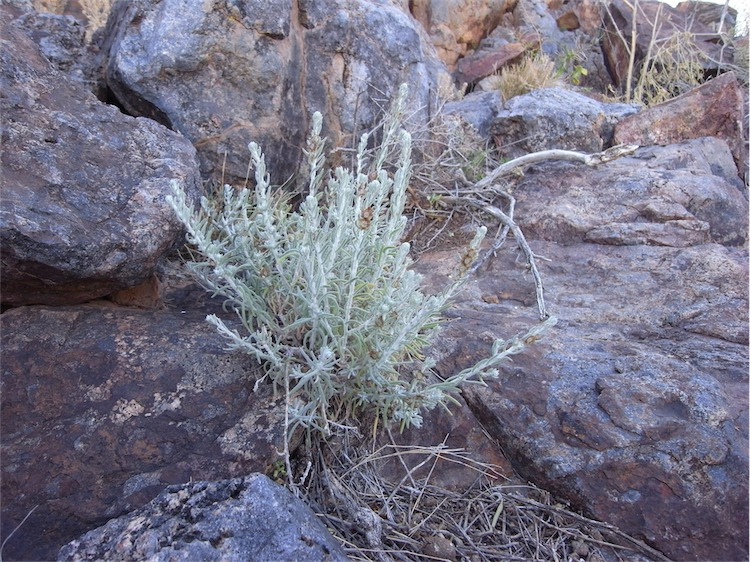
In the Boolcoomatta Reserve

Maireana integra, commonly known as entire-wing bluebush, is a species of flowering plant in the family Amaranthaceae and is endemic to Australia. It is a shrub with woolly branches, more or less terete leaves and bisexual flowers arranged singly, the glabrous fruiting perianth tube-shaped with a simple, glabrous wing.

== Description ==
Maireana integra is a shrub that typically grows to a height of up to 1 m (3 ft 3 in) and has branches covered with woolly hairs. Its leaves are arranged alternately, more or less terete, linear to oblong, 5–14 mm (0.20–0.55 in) long, about 1 mm (0.039 in) wide and covered with woolly hairs. The flowers are bisexual and arranged singly. The fruiting perianth is pale to dark brown when dry, with a hemispherical tube 1 mm (0.039 in) high and 2.5 mm (0.098 in) wide at the top, and glabrous. The wing is simple, glabrous, horizontal and about 10 mm (0.39 in) in diameter.

== Taxonomy ==
This species was first described in 1965 by Paul G.Wilson who gave it the name Kochia integra in the supplement to J.M.Black's Flora of South Australia from specimens collected near the Rawlinson Range in 1962. In 1975, Paul G. Wilson transferred the species to Maireana as M. integra in the journal Nuytsia. The specific epithet (integra) means 'whole', referring to the ring of the fruit.

== Distribution and habitat ==
This species of Maireana usually grows in loam or clay in saline flats and claypans and is found from the Carnarvon, Central Ranges, Coolgardie, Gibson Desert, Great Victoria Desert, Little Sandy Desert, Murchison, Nullarbor and Pilbara bioregions of Western Australia, and west through South Australia, the southern Northern Territory and Queensland to the western plains of New South Wales.
