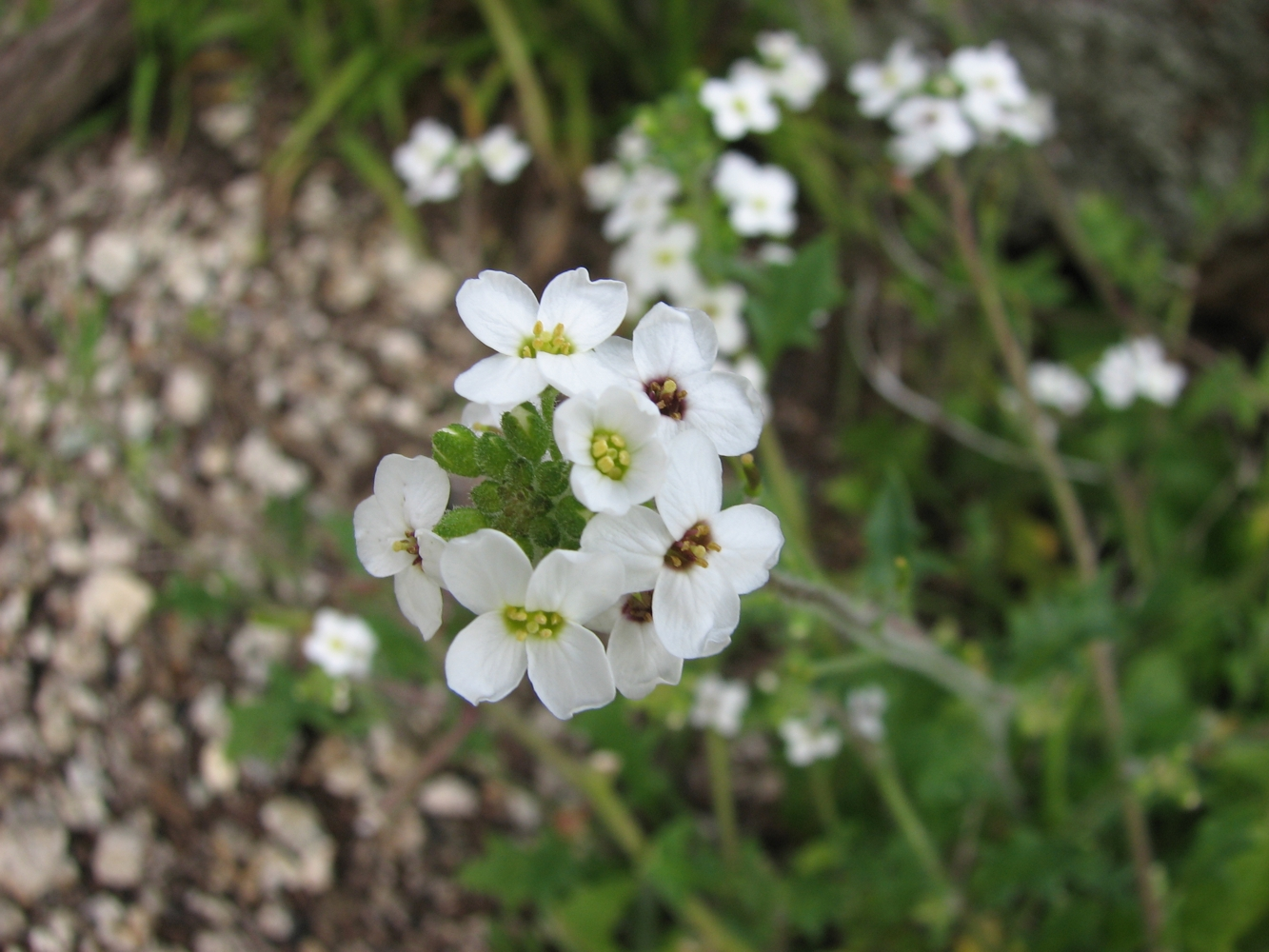
- Pachymitus cardaminoides at Terrick Terrick National Park

Scientific classification
- Kingdom: Plantae
- Clade: Tracheophytes
- Clade: Angiosperms
- Clade: Eudicots
- Clade: Rosids
- Order: Brassicales
- Family: Brassicaceae
- Genus: Pachymitus; O.E.Schulz
- Species: P. cardaminoides

Binomial name
- Pachymitus cardaminoides (F.Muell.) O.E.Schulz

Synonyms
- Blennodia cardaminoides (F.Muell.) Benth.; Blennodia lucae (F.Muell.) Maiden & Betche; Erysimum lucae F.Muell.; Pachymitus lucae (F.Muell.) O.E.Schulz; Sisymbrium cardaminoides F.Muell.; Sisymbrium lucae (F.Muell.) F.Muell.

= Pachymitus =

Genus of plant

Pachymitus is a monotypic plant genus in the mustard family Brassicaceae. The sole species is Pachymitus cardaminoides, commonly known as sand cress, which is native to Australia. It occurs in the states of New South Wales, Victoria and South Australia.

Originally collected from near the mouth of the Murray River, the species was originally described as Sisymbrium cardaminoides by Ferdinand von Mueller in 1855, before the genus Pachymitus was erected by Otto Eugen Schulz in 1924.

Pachymitus cardaminoides is a small herbaceous shrub which grows to 30 cm (12 in) in height. It is found in inland New South Wales, Victoria, and South Australia.
