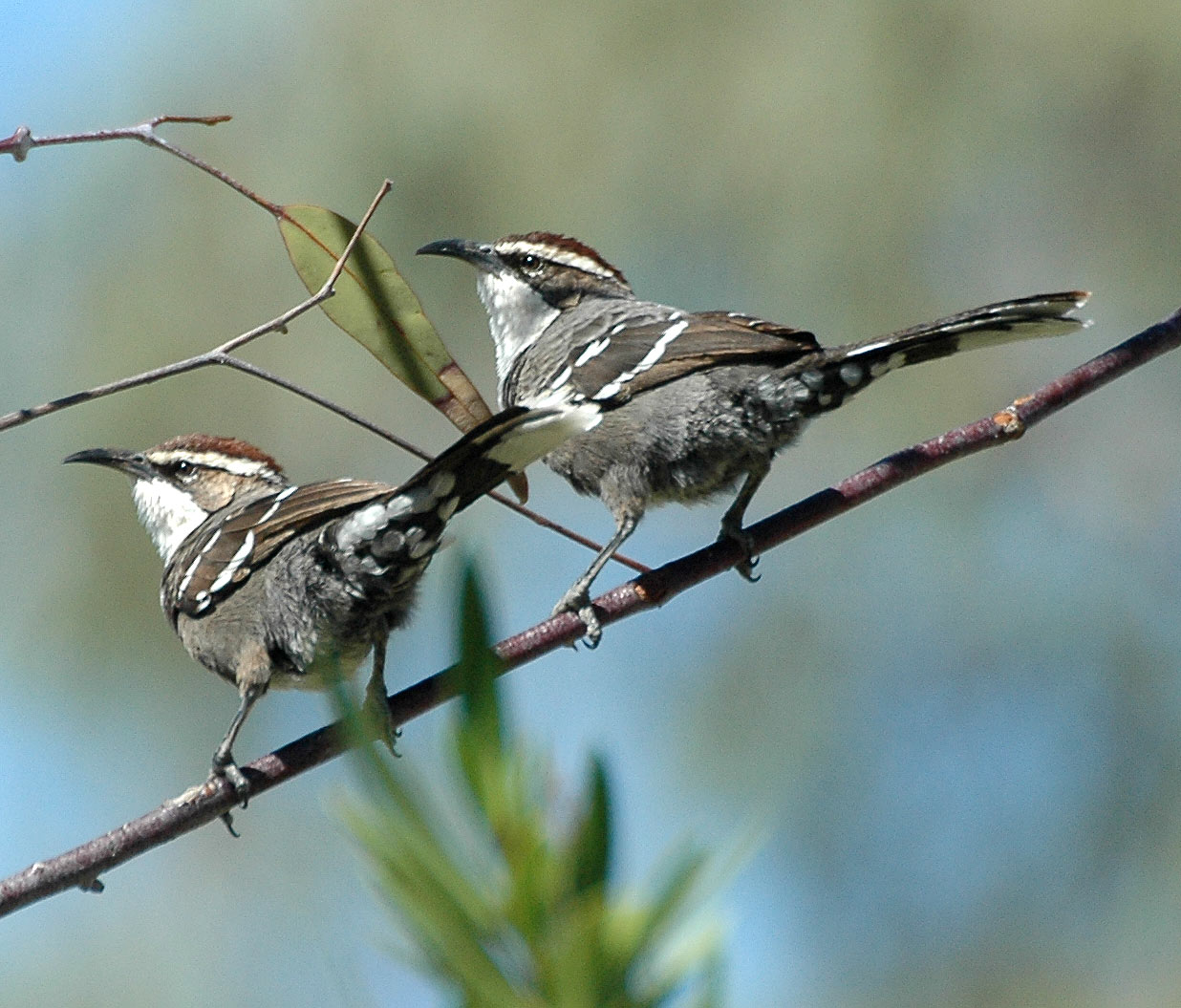
- Chestnut-crowned babbler Pomatostomus ruficeps.

Scientific classification
- Kingdom: Animalia
- Phylum: Chordata
- Class: Aves
- Order: Passeriformes
- Infraorder: Orthonychides
- Family: Pomatostomidae; Schodde, 1975

Genus & Species
- Garritornis; Garritornis isidorei; Pomatostomus; Pomatostomus temporalis; Pomatostomus superciliosus; Pomatostomus halli; Pomatostomus ruficeps

= Australo-Papuan babbler =

Australo-Papuan babblers

Family of birds

The Pomatostomidae (Australo-Papuan or Australasian babblers, also known as pseudo-babblers) are small to medium-sized birds endemic to Australia-New Guinea. For many years, the Australo-Papuan babblers were classified, rather uncertainly, with the Old World babblers (Timaliidae), on the grounds of similar appearance and habits. More recent research, however, indicates that they are too basal to belong the Passerida – let alone the Sylvioidea where the Old World babblers are placed – and they are now classed as a separate family close to the Orthonychidae (logrunners). Five species in two genera are currently recognised, although the red-breasted subspecies rubeculus of the grey-crowned babbler may prove to be a separate species.

== Description ==
The Australo-Papuan babblers are medium-sized terrestrial birds with sombre plumage and long decurved bills. They range in size from 17–27 cm (6.5–10.5 in) in length and 30–85 g (1.1–3.0 oz) in weight. The wings are short and round, and the tail is long and often held fanned which makes it look broad as well. The feet and legs are strong and adapted to a terrestrial existence. There is no sexual dimorphism in the plumage, which is composed of brown, russet and grey colours, with all but the Papuan babbler having striking white markings on the face and throat. The plumage of juvenile birds is similar to that of adults.

== Behaviour and ecology ==
All five species are ground-feeding omnivores and highly social. Babblers live in family groups and small flocks of up to about 20 individuals and forage communally, calling loudly to one another all day long. They feed principally on insects and other invertebrates, but will also take seeds, fruits and small vertebrates. Most food is obtained on the ground, although they will also forage in low bushes; the grey-crowned babbler and Papuan babbler feed more extensively in vegetation than the other species. The long bill is used to probe and overturn large objects. They will also hold objects with one foot and hammer them with the bill in order to extract food.

=== Breeding ===
Australo-Papuan babblers are monogamous breeders which defend territories. The breeding pair will be aided in breeding by a number of helpers from its group. This is similar to the cooperative breeding system used by the fish species Neolamprologus pulcher with the difference being that N. pulcher are polygynous instead of monogamous. A number of groups may have more than one breeding pair. Extra male helpers aid the male in his responsibilities whereas the females aid the main breeding female in hers. They have an extended breeding season. Australo-Papuan babblers construct large nests for communal roosting, and these nests may be used for breeding, or new nests may be constructed. There may be a large number of nests used by the group in a small area. When the female is breeding she alone uses the breeding nest. Construction, both of roosting and breeding nests, is undertaken by all birds in the group. Between one and six eggs are laid (the number and range varies by species) and are usually incubated by the breeding female alone (although a helper female may aid occasionally). The breeding male and other helper males feed the breeding female during incubation. Incubation lasts between 19 and 25 days. The female broods the chicks until they are able to thermoregulate, and the chicks fledge after 16–23 days. After leaving the nest, the chicks will continue to be fed by the adults for a number of months.

== Species of Pomatostomidae ==
Image	Scientific name	Common name	Distribution
Garritornis
	Garritornis isidorei	Papuan babbler	Indonesia and Papua New Guinea
Pomatostomus
	Pomatostomus temporalis	Grey-crowned babbler	Australia, Indonesia, and Papua New Guinea.
	Pomatostomus superciliosus	White-browed babbler	central and southern Australia
	Pomatostomus halli	Hall's babbler	eastern Australia
	Pomatostomus ruficeps	Chestnut-crowned babbler	south-eastern Australia
