= Terrick Terrick National Park =

National park in Victoria, Australia

- IUCN category II (national park)
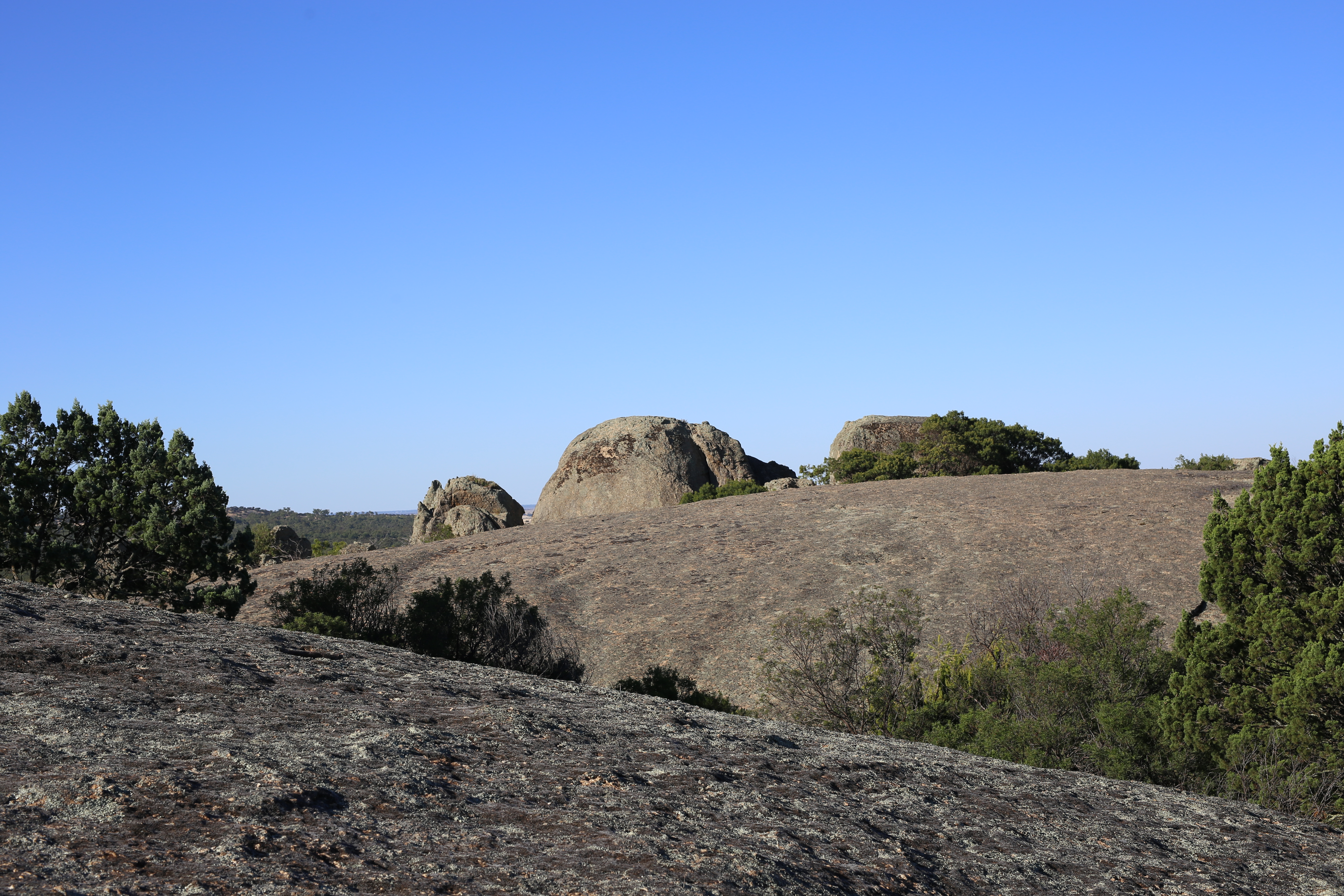
- Terrick Terrick National Park, January 2017

- Location within Victoria
- Location: Victoria
- Nearest city: Echuca
- Coordinates: 36°8′34″S 144°13′42″E
- Area: 38.8 km^{2} (15.0 sq mi)
- Established: June 1988
- Governing body: Parks Victoria
- Website: Official website

The Terrick Terrick National Park is a national park located in the region of Victoria, Australia. The 3,880-hectare (9,600-acre) national park was declared in June 1988 and is situated approximately 225 kilometres (140 mi) northwest of Melbourne, 4 kilometres (2.5 mi) north of the town of Mitiamo and 65 kilometres (40 mi) north of Bendigo. The national park is an important remnant of Box-Ironbark forests and northern grass plains and is close to Kow Swamp, the site of a major palaeontological find providing insight into the origins of Indigenous Australians. There are many walking tracks and one basic campground. Drinking water is not available in the park and must be carried.

Terrick Terrick National Park is one of the last remaining strongholds for the Plains-wanderer, an endangered Australian endemic bird species. The park is part of the Patho Plains Important Bird Area, so identified by BirdLife International principally because of its importance for the conservation of Plains-wanderers.

The minimum elevation of the terrain is 82m, and the maximum is 196m.

== See also ==
- Protected areas of Victoria
- Striped legless lizard
- Fat-tailed dunnart
- List of reduplicated Australian place names
- List of national parks of Australia
