= Pualco Range Conservation Park =

Protected area in South Australia

- IUCN category VI (protected area with sustainable use of natural resources)
- Location within South Australia
- Location: South Australia
- Nearest city: Yunta
- Coordinates: 32°57′36.72″S 139°33′51.84″E
- Area: 78.77 km^{2} (30.41 sq mi)
- Established: 23 September 2010
- Governing body: Department for Environment and Water

Pualco Range Conservation Park is a protected area in the Australian state of South Australia located in the locality of Pualco Range about 30 kilometres (19 miles) south of the town of Yunta in the state's Far North region.

The conservation park was proclaimed under the National Parks and Wildlife Act 1972 in 2010 as the land "supports high value habitat for the endangered plains wanderer, a distinctive, quail-like bird, as well as other species of state conservation significance including the Major Mitchell's cockatoo, blue-winged parrot and peregrine falcon".

The conservation park is classified as an IUCN Category VI protected area.

== See also ==
- Protected areas of South Australia
