= Boolcoomatta, Bindarrah and Kalkaroo Stations Important Bird Area =

Important Bird Area in South Australia

Coordinates: 31°53′47″S 140°35′52″E

Location of the Boolcoomatta, Bindarrah and Kalkaroo Stations Important Bird Area in South Australia

The Boolcoomatta, Bindarrah and Kalkaroo Stations Important Bird Area is a 1402 km^{2} tract of land in north-eastern South Australia. It comprises three pastoral properties, 53,000 ha Kalkaroo Station, 24,000 ha Bindarrah Station, and 63,000 ha Boolcoomatta. The whole site has been identified by BirdLife International as an Important Bird Area (IBA) because it supports a significant population of endangered plains-wanderers – perhaps the largest population of the species outside the Riverina region of New South Wales.

== Description ==
The IBA lies on sandy and clay loam soils that support open tussock grasslands and chenopod shrublands, with stands of river redgums on drainage courses. The three properties have a history of extensive grazing by livestock and by feral herbivores.

Boolcoomatta, formerly a sheep station but since 2006 a private protected area has been owned and managed by Bush Heritage Australia.

=== Birds ===
As well as plains-wanderers, significant bird populations in the IBA include chirruping wedgebills, cinnamon quail-thrushes, inland dotterels, redthroats and slender-billed thornbills.

== See also ==
- List of birds of South Australia
