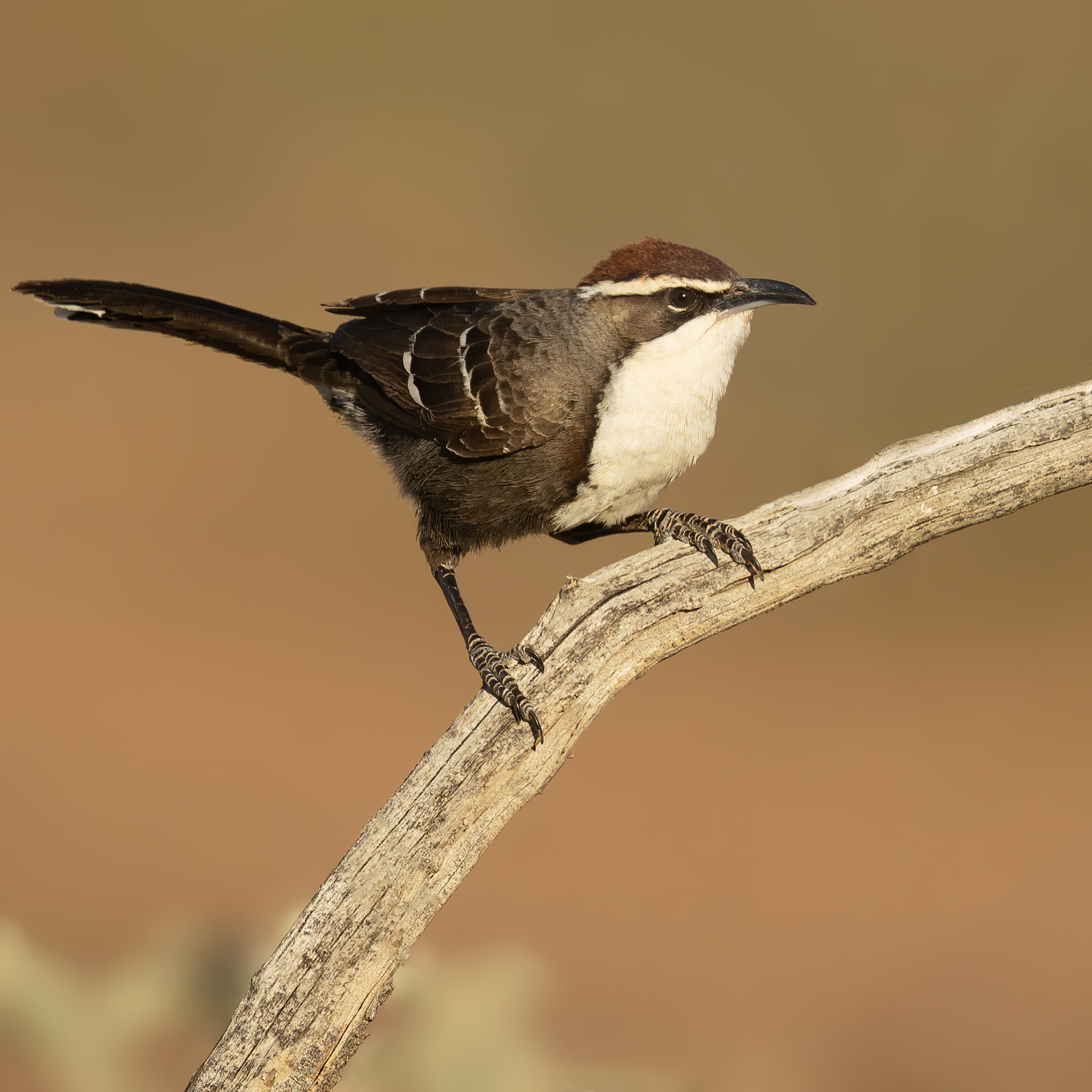

Conservation status
- Least Concern (IUCN 3.1)

Scientific classification
- Kingdom: Animalia
- Phylum: Chordata
- Class: Aves
- Order: Passeriformes
- Family: Pomatostomidae
- Genus: Pomatostomus
- Species: P. ruficeps

Binomial name
- Pomatostomus ruficeps (Hartlaub, 1852)

= Chestnut-crowned babbler =

Species of bird

The chestnut-crowned babbler (Pomatostomus ruficeps) is a medium-sized bird that is endemic to arid and semi-arid areas of south-eastern Australia. It is a member of the family Pomatostomidae, which comprises five species of Australo-Papuan babblers. All are boisterous and highly social, living in groups of up to 23 individuals that forage and breed communally. Other names include red-capped babbler, rufous-crowned babbler and chatterer.

== Description ==
Chestnut-crowned babblers are dark, brown-grey birds with a white throat and breast, white-tipped tail and a long, black, down-curved bill. Wings are short and rounded and the tail is long with a rounded tip. Diagnostic features include two white wing bars and a rich, chestnut crown highlighted by long, white eyebrows. The birds have dark brown eyes and grey legs, while the wings, back and flanks are brown-grey to mottled dusky on the mantle. The white of the throat and breast is well-defined and narrower than that of the similar, white-browed babbler (Pomatostomus superciliosus). Combined, these characteristics give the chestnut-crowned babbler a rather unusual appearance.

At 21–23 cm and approximately 50 g in weight, the chestnut-crowned babbler is noticeably smaller than the grey-crowned babbler (Pomatostomus temporalis). It also gives the appearance of being slimmer than other babbler species. Adults are sexually monomorphic. Immature birds are like the adults but duller, with a pale rufous eyebrow and chest, brown crown and whitish patch behind the eye.

== Distribution and habitat ==
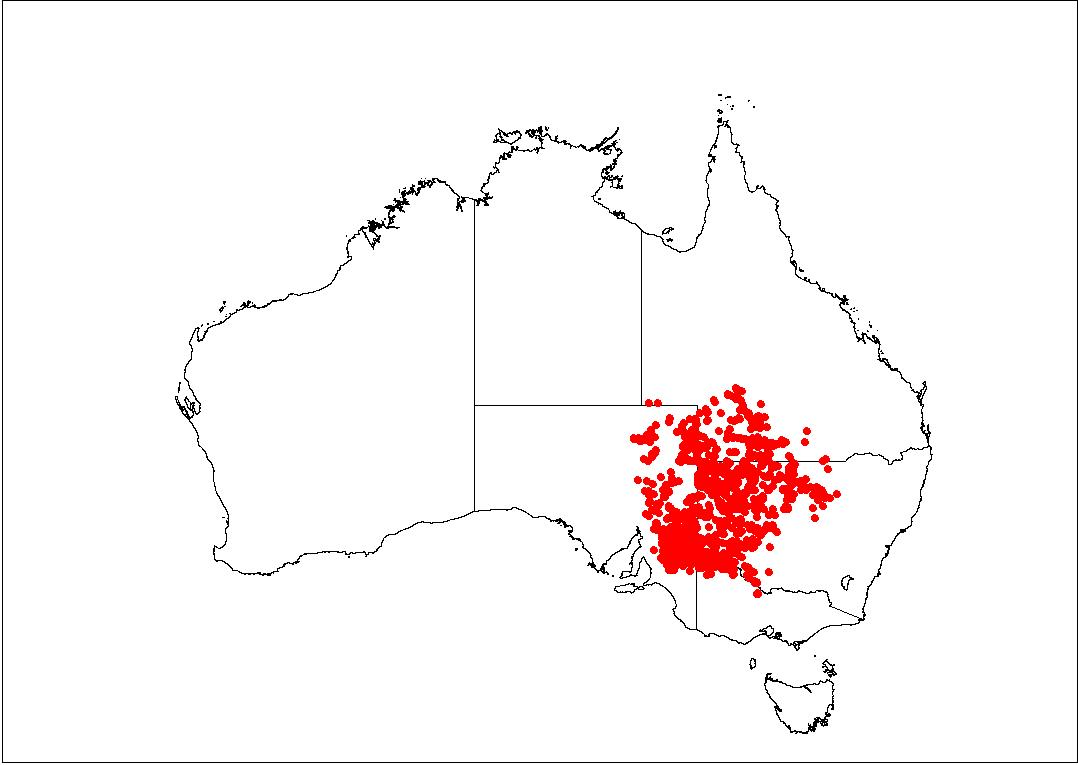
Distribution of the chestnut-crowned babbler (BirdLife Australia Atlas Project)

Chestnut-crowned babblers are found in inland areas of south-eastern Australia, including parts of western New South Wales, south-western Queensland, eastern South Australia and north-western Victoria. Its distribution lies within the south-eastern Lake Eyre Basin and the western Murray-Darling Basin.

The species commonly inhabits mallee, mulga and belar woodlands that are drier and more open than those occupied by the white-browed babbler and Hall's babbler (Pomatostomus halli). Other habitats include acacia and cypress pine scrubs and woodlands, stony ground and sandhills, and lignum, saltbush and samphire.

Chestnut-crowned babblers are most readily sighted at Eulo Bore, Bowra Station and in Hattah-Kulkyne National Park, as well as along many outback roads including those between Quilpie and Windorah, and Bourke and Nyngan.

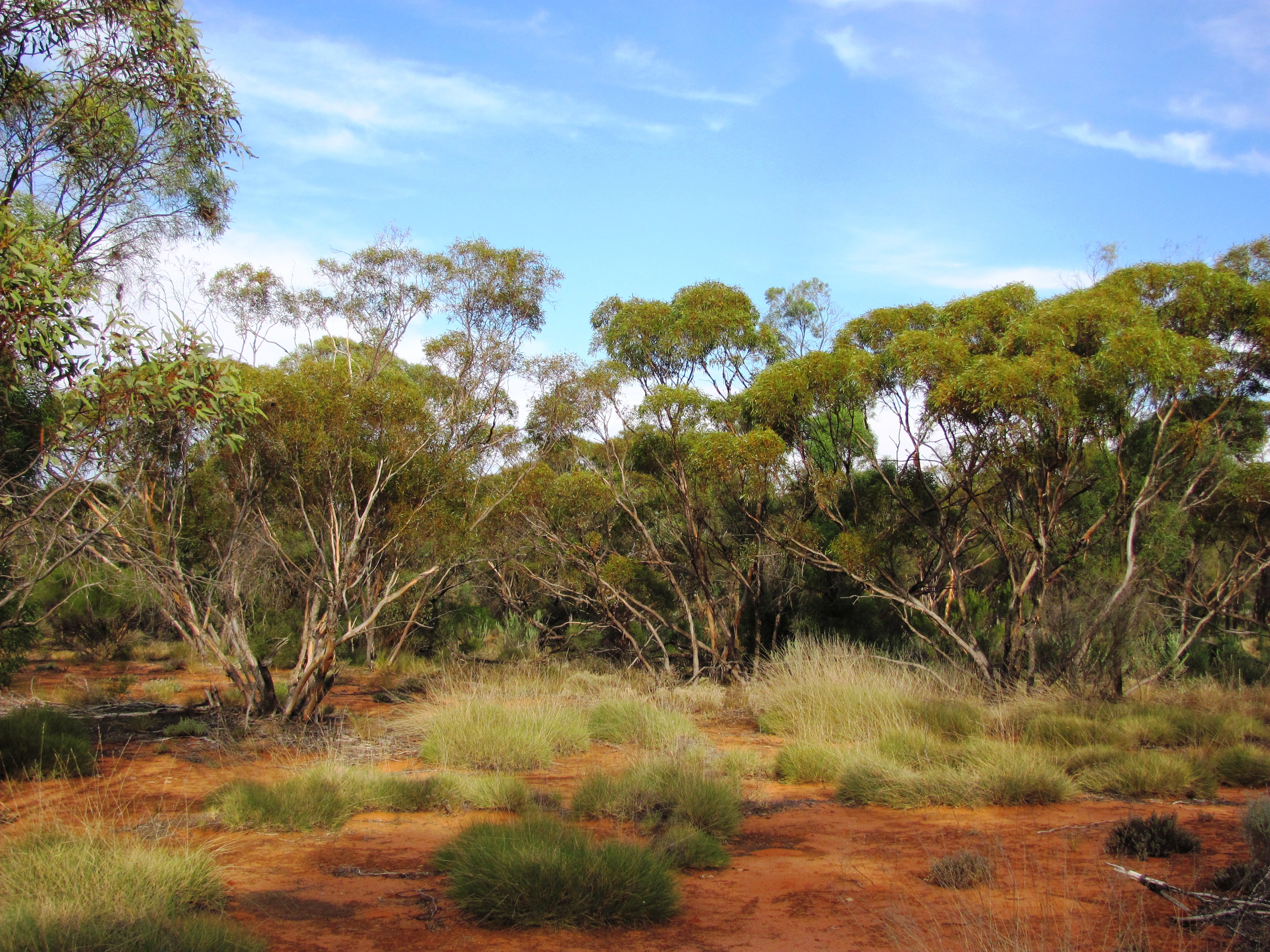
Typical chestnut-crowned babbler habitat, Gluepot Reserve, South Australia

== Behaviour ==
Babblers are renowned for their cheerful, energetic, and social behaviour. During the non-breeding season (December - June), chestnut-crowned babblers form cohesive social groups of 3 to 23 individuals that maintain a territory, roost and forage together. Dust-bathing and preening may also be undertaken as a group. At night, they crowd together in a communal roosting nest, built by the group in dead or partly living trees. These dormitory nests may also be disused breeding nests, to which the group continues to add material.

If disturbed, individuals hop away behind cover, departing in long, low glides. When alarmed, they may huddle together under dense foliage or dash up the under-canopy of trees and shrubs, chattering noisily. They are playful and have been known to wear trenches in the ground from chasing each other around; however, they are shyer than other babbler species.

== Diet and feeding ==
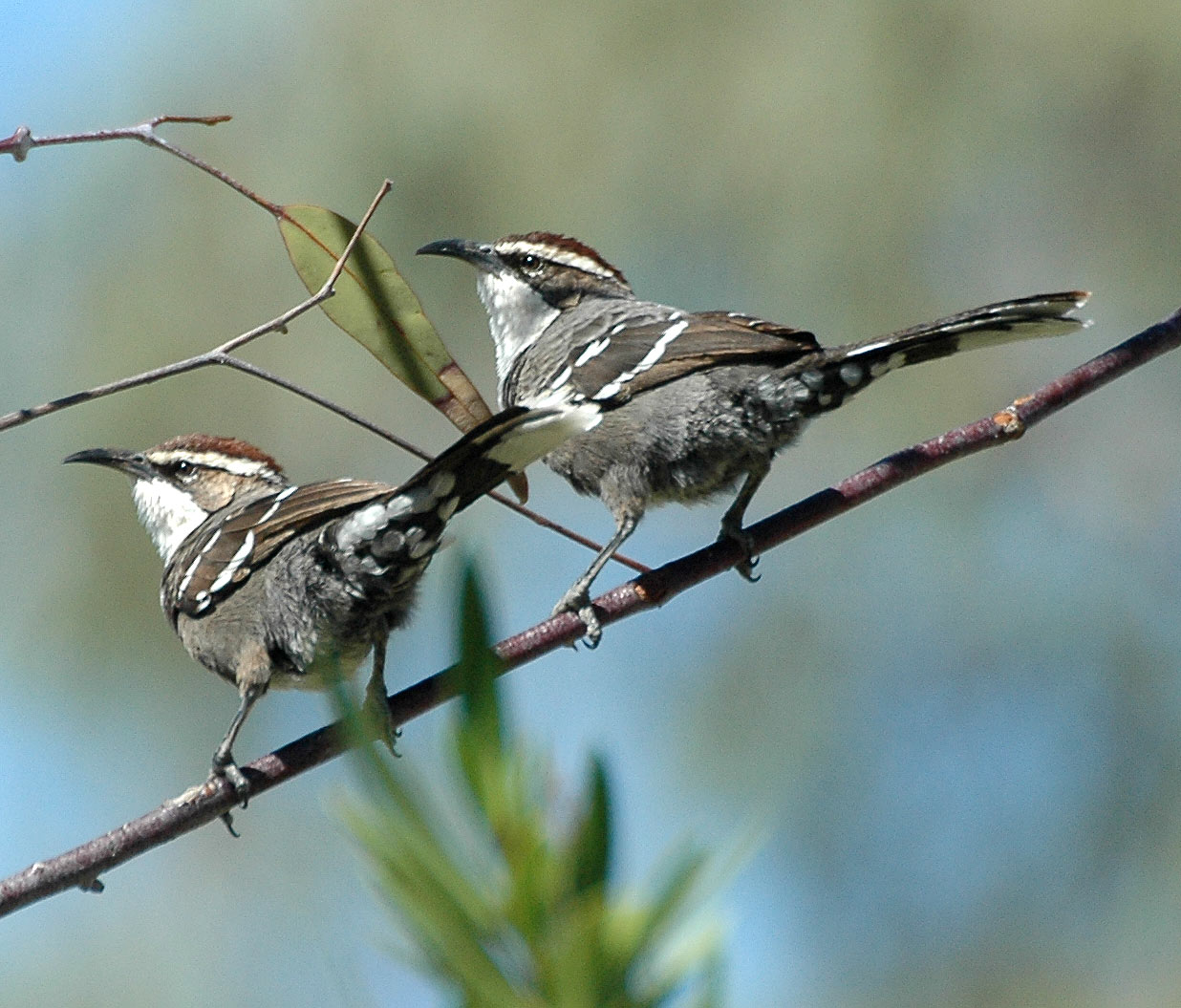
Adult chestnut-crowned babblers

Chestnut-crowned babblers are usually seen hopping noisily about on the ground, through shrubs, over logs and up the branches of trees. They rummage and probe in ground litter and bark crevices, looking for insects and their larvae, spiders, small amphibians, crustaceans and reptiles, as well as fruits and seeds. Most of the day is spent foraging and this often occurs within drainage zones, which are thought to offer greater cover from predators and a higher abundance of prey. They are not known to 'hawk' for flying insects.

== Voice ==
The birds have a strident, irregular but melodious territorial song, similar to the piping of the little eagle (Hieraaetus morphnoides), emitted from the top of a tall mulga tree or similar vantage point. There is constant chattering among members of the group, including whistling calls intermixed with tchak-tchak-tchak, which becomes louder and more frequent when excited, quarrelling or alarmed. The group contact call is a whistling tsee-tsee, tsee-tsee.

== Breeding ==
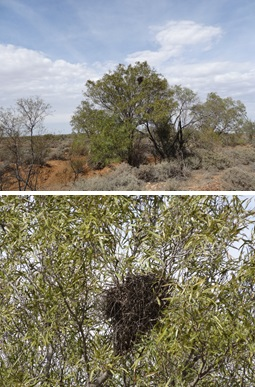
Chestnut-crowned babbler nest, Sturt National Park, NSW

Breeding usually occurs between July and November. The nest is a large and conspicuous dome about 50 cm in diameter and almost 100 cm high. It is constructed in a forked tree branch, 4–10 m above the ground, using long sticks. Nests are larger, neater and often higher than those constructed by white-browed babblers and are made from finer sticks. Old nests may be enlarged and used repeatedly.

Eggs are approximately 27 x 19 mm, pale grey-brown, oval and covered with sepia and dusky hairlines. Clutch size is typically 2-6 eggs and nestlings fledge after 21–25 days. Unusually large clutches may result from the use of a single brood nest by more than one breeding pair.

=== Cooperative breeding ===
The chestnut-crowned babbler is an obligate cooperatively breeding bird and much of the research on this species has focused on aspects of its breeding strategy. Each group contains monogamous breeding pairs and subordinate 'helpers' that provide care, particularly through food provisioning, for offspring that are not their own. The entire troop helps to build the nest, feed the incubating female and defend the breeding territory. Reproduction without help is rarely attempted and is typically unsuccessful in this species.

Several hypotheses have been proposed to explain helping behaviour in cooperatively breeding bird species. Classic ideas of ecological or demographic constraints on offspring dispersal and breeding appear to be limited in their application to the chestnut-crowned babbler, nor is there any evidence to suggest that signal-based factors are important. Signal-based factors predict that helpers gain from perceived, rather than actual, levels of care. The hypotheses of kin selection and group augmentation, which reinforce honest helping behaviour, are more likely to be relevant to this species. Predation is also thought to play a role in the selection of group living, as higher predation risks have been correlated with a reduction in ground foraging and an increase in sentinel behaviour. However, it has now been established that kin selection plays the most significant role in the maintenance of cooperative breeding in this species, regardless of the apparent importance of living in large groups.

Chestnut-crowned babblers are plural breeders, with most social groups disbanding into multiple breeding units whose members associate with a single nest. These units re-amalgamate after breeding but have a highly repeatable composition between years. In one study, breeding units occupied non-exclusive home-ranges averaging 38 ha, with larger units occupying larger ranges and each range overlapping that of up to three neighbouring units. There were 2 to 13 adults in each breeding unit. The size of the breeding unit has a significant effect on breeding success, with an extra chick fledged for every three helpers in the group. These helper effects are among the strongest reported for pomatostomid babblers, possibly reflecting the species' extreme home environment.

The sex ratio within groups is significantly male biased, whilst dispersal is significantly female biased. No sex bias has been detected within nestlings or juveniles. It is probable that females suffer higher mortality rates due to either the risks associated with dispersal or the physiological cost of breeding. Breeding females also provide less food to young than do breeding males and helpers, and they reduce their provisioning rates in the presence of additional helpers. This suggests that breeding females seek to conserve resources for future reproduction.

== Predation ==
The chestnut-crowned babbler lives in open environments and is vulnerable to predation by aerial predators. Groups are more likely to be attacked by avian predators when dependent young are present, whilst large groups are more likely to encounter predators but less likely to be attacked. Potential avian predators include the brown falcon (Falco berigora), peregrine falcon (Falco peregrinus), Australian hobby (Falco longipennis), brown goshawk (Accipiter fasciatus) and collared sparrowhawk (Accipiter cirrhocephalus). All of these species are known to elicit pronounced alarm calls from chestnut-crowned babblers when they fly in close proximity to the group.

== Conservation status ==
Internationally, the chestnut-crowned babbler is listed as least concern on the IUCN Red List. It is not listed as threatened under Australia's national Environment Protection and Biodiversity Conservation Act 1999 or under Queensland, New South Wales, Victorian or South Australian legislation. Little is known about its movements but the species is thought to be sedentary and it is scarce to locally common.
