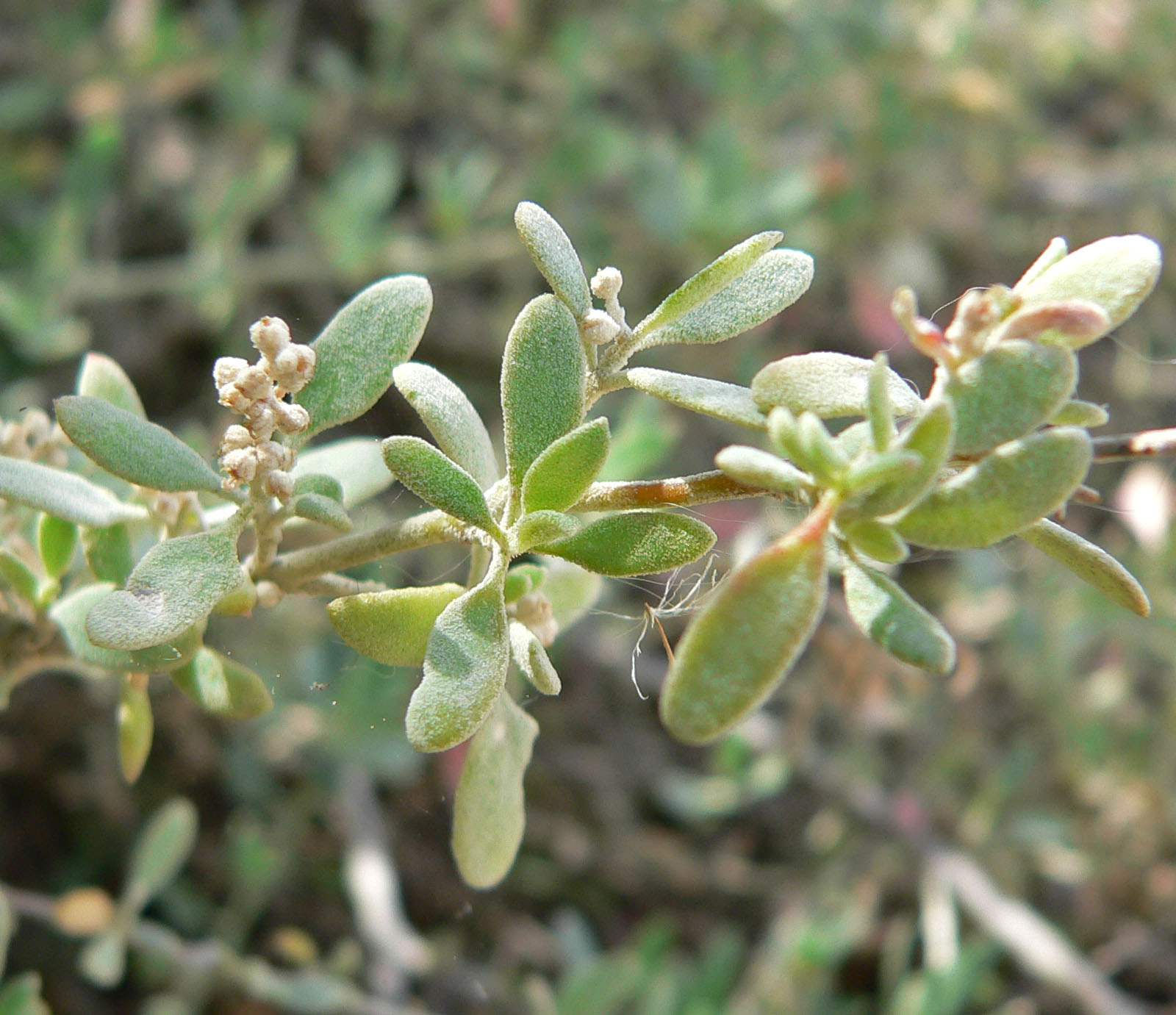

Conservation status
- Least Concern (TPWCA)

Scientific classification
- Kingdom: Plantae
- Clade: Tracheophytes
- Clade: Angiosperms
- Clade: Eudicots
- Order: Caryophyllales
- Family: Amaranthaceae
- Genus: Chenopodium
- Species: C. spinescens

Binomial name
- Chenopodium spinescens (R.Br.) S.Fuentes & Borsch
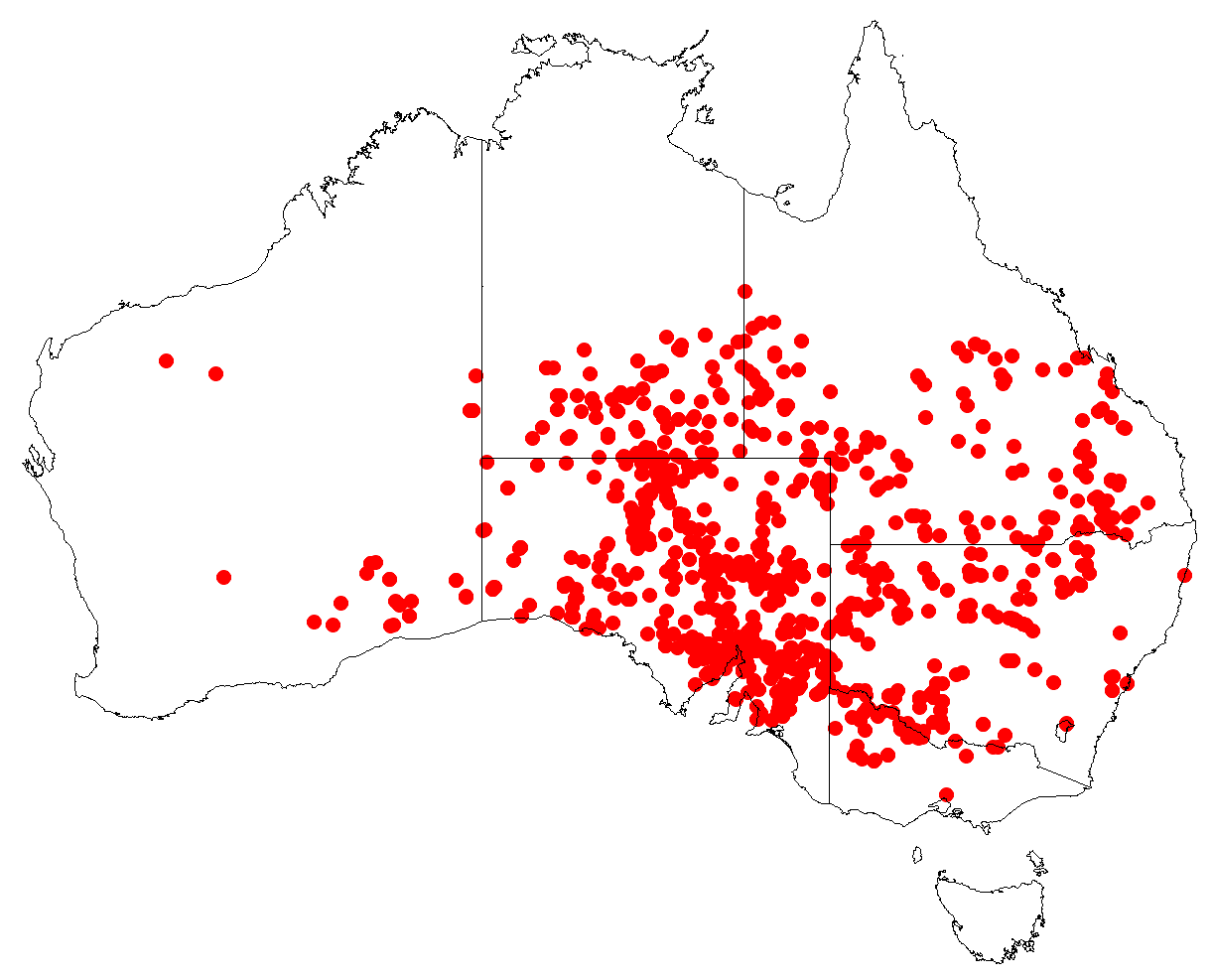
- Occurrence data from AVH

Synonyms
- Rhagodia deltophylla (F.Muell.) A.J.Scott; Rhagodia spinescens R.Br.

= Chenopodium spinescens =

Species of plant

Chenopodium spinescens (common names: spiny saltbush, berry saltbush, thorny saltbush, creeping saltbush, hedge saltbush) is a species of plant in the family Amaranthaceae and is endemic to all mainland states and territories of Australia where it is known as Rhagodia spinescens.

== Description ==
Chenopodium spinescens is a multi-stemmed dense shrub to 2 metres (7 ft) high, with branches often ending in spines. The leaves are alternate or opposite, and mealy, looking grey green to almost whitish from their covering of saucer-shaped/spherical hairs. The leaf shape is ovate to triangular, and are 5–17 millimetres (0.2–0.7 in) long and 5–17 millimetres (0.2–0.7 in) wide. The leaf petiole is about half the length of the lamina. Male and female flowers are usually on different plants. The flowers have five perianth segments that are tiny and all alike, and five stamens. The ripe fruit are red and succulent.

The inflorescence is a panicle or spike, with the flowers' perianth being densely mealy on the outside. The male flowers are globular and 0.5–1 mm in diameter, with their filaments united into a smooth saucer-shaped disc. The female flowers are larger (about 1 mm) and globular to top-shaped.

The fruit is a depressed globular pink or red succulent berry, and the seed is approximately 1 millimetre (0.04 in) in diameter with a reticulate coat. In the Northern Territory, it flowers and fruits from February to December, while in Victoria, it flowers from January to April.

=== Differences from closely related species ===
The Northern Territory Government website accepts the names R. spinescens (for C. spinescens), R. parabolica (for C. parabolicum) and R. eremaea (for C. eremaea), and describes the differences between them as follows:

Rhagodia spinescens differs from R. parabolica, in having smaller leaves (mostly 5-17 mm long, compared to mostly 15-30 mm long), a narrower inflorescence and a preference for non-rocky sites. It differs from R. eremaea in having leaves that are alternate or opposite (compared to consistently alternate), often spade-shaped, equal length and width or slightly longer than wide (cf. distinctly long relative to their width), with round saucer-like vesicles on the undersurface (compared irregular-shaped vesicles) and have a fishy or foetid odour.

== Taxonomy ==
This saltbush was first formally described in 1810 by Robert Brown who gave it the name Rhagodia spinescens in Prodromus Florae Novae Hollandiae et Insulae Van Diemen. In 2012, Susy Fuentes Bazán and Thomas Borsch moved all species of Rhagodia to Chenopodium within the broader family, Amaranthaceae, a change accepted by Rafaël Govaerts at Plants of the World Online. However, the assignation of this plant to the genus, Rhagodia, and to the family, Chenopodiaceae, is the taxonomy accepted by the Council of Heads of Australasian Herbaria, the National Herbarium of New South Wales, Royal Botanic Gardens Victoria, State Herbarium of South Australia, the Northern Territory Government, Queensland Department of Environment and Science and Western Australian Government Department of Biodiversity, Conservation and Attractions.

== Habitat ==
In the Northern Territory, it occurs on sandplains, alluvial plains, intermittent sandy watercourses, on sandy edges of salt lakes, and rarely on gravelly hillslopes. In Victoria, it is usually found on heavy, saline or subsaline soils at the edges of lakes, on flats, and in dune swales.

== Distribution ==
It is found in the IBRA bioregions of Burt Plain, Central Ranges, Channel Country, Coolgardie, Finke, Flinders Lofty Block, Gawler, Great Sandy Desert, Great Victoria Desert, MacDonnell Ranges, Mitchell Grass Downs, Nullarbor, Riverina, Simpson Strzelecki Dunefields, Stony Plains, and Tanami. (Bioregions from Victoria, Queensland and New South Wales may not be included.)

== Propagation ==
The advice for propagation is to take soft, current season growth tips from actively growing plants; store and transport wrapped in wet newspaper and sealed in a plastic bag, and plant after trimming cuttings to a length of 5–10 centimetres (2.0–3.9 in) and dipping in 3000 ppm IBA rooting hormone.
