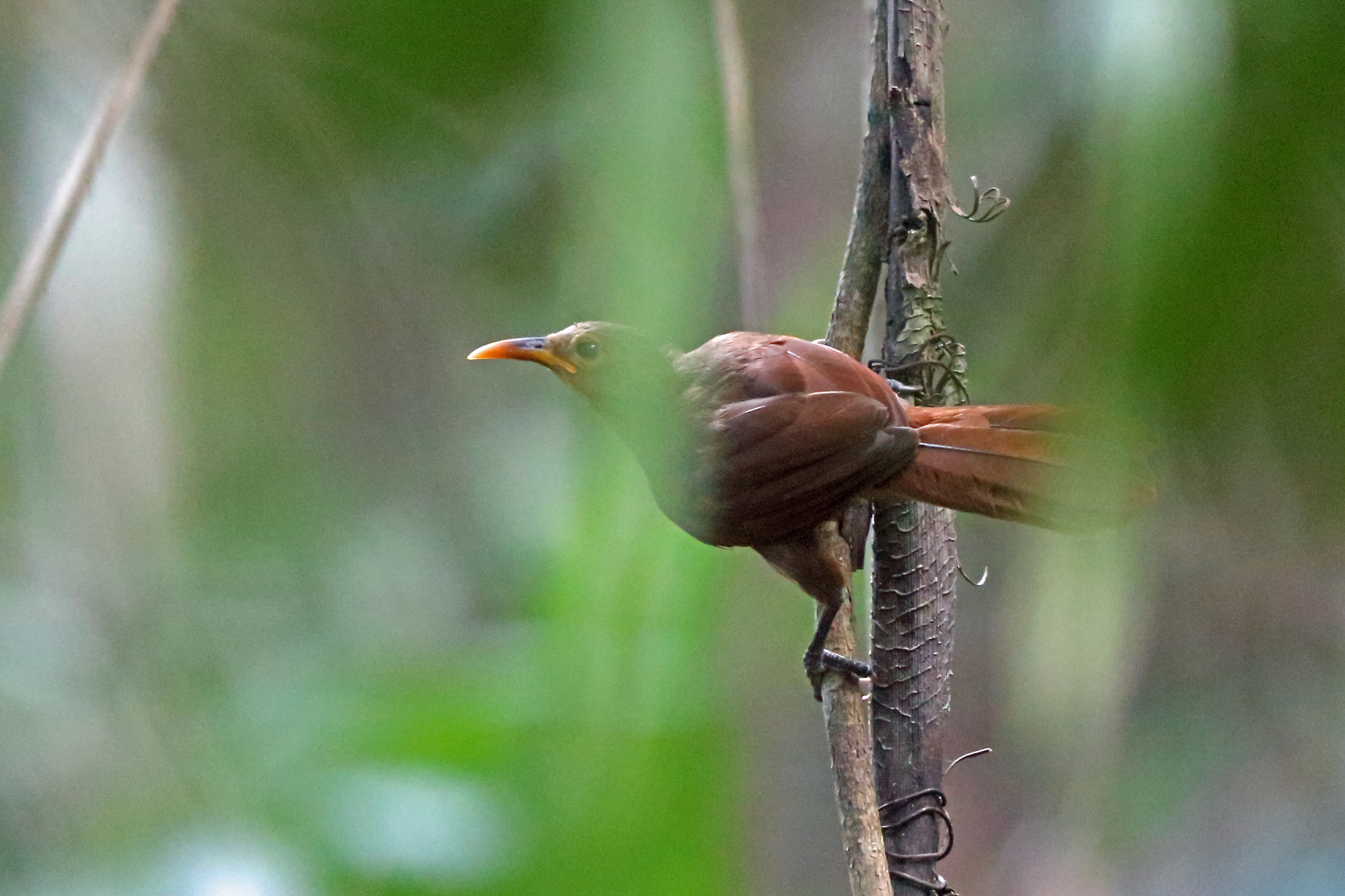

Conservation status
- Least Concern (IUCN 3.1)

Scientific classification
- Kingdom: Animalia
- Phylum: Chordata
- Class: Aves
- Order: Passeriformes
- Family: Pomatostomidae
- Genus: Garritornis; Iredale, 1956
- Species: G. isidorei

Binomial name
- Garritornis isidorei (Lesson, 1827)

Synonyms
- Pomatostomus isidorei

= Papuan babbler =

Species of bird

The Papuan babbler (Garritornis isidorei), New Guinea babbler, or Isidore's rufous babbler, is a species of bird in the family Pomatostomidae. It is found in New Guinea and its natural habitat is subtropical or tropical moist lowland forests.
