= Boolcoomatta Reserve =

Protected area in South Australia

- IUCN category II (national park)
- Location within South Australia
- Location: South Australia
- Nearest city: Olary
- Coordinates: 31.933°S 140.595°E
- Area: 644.88 km^{2} (248.99 sq mi)
- Established: 2006
- Governing body: Bush Heritage Australia
- Website: https://www.bushheritage.org.au/places/boolcoomatta

Boolcoomatta Reserve is a 645 km^{2} private protected area in eastern South Australia, 463 km north-east of Adelaide and 100 km west of Broken Hill. It is owned and managed by Bush Heritage Australia (BHA).

== History ==
The land was used as a sheep station for 150 years, running a flock as large as 90,000 sheep. There are also relics of some small-scale copper mining on the property.

The land was purchased by BHA in 2006 with assistance from the Australian Government and Nature Foundation SA.

== Landscape and vegetation ==
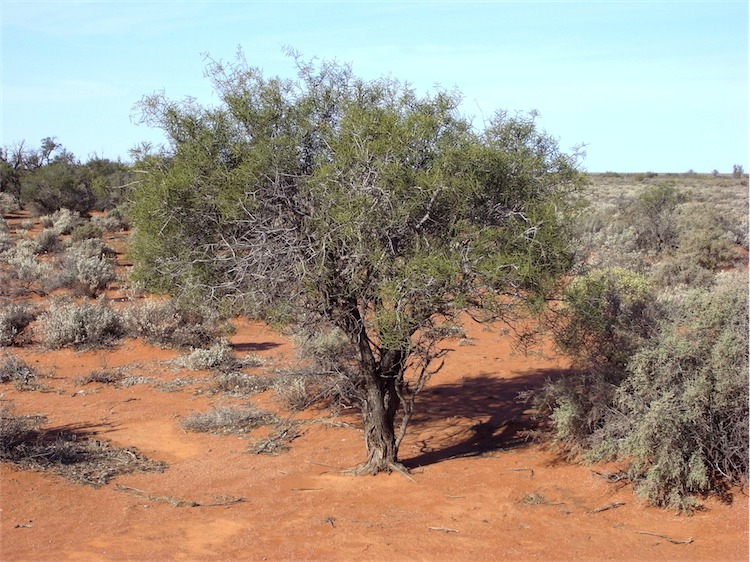
Acacia carneorum in Boolcoomatta Reserve

Much of Boolcoomatta is flat, with undulating ranges and rocky outcrops in the western section of the property. The ranges support open Acacia woodland while the plains to the east support shrublands of chenopods, including saltbush, as well as tussock grassland. Usually dry creeks, with occasional waterholes, are lined with river red gums. The climate is arid, with an average annual rainfall of 190 mm.

== Fauna ==
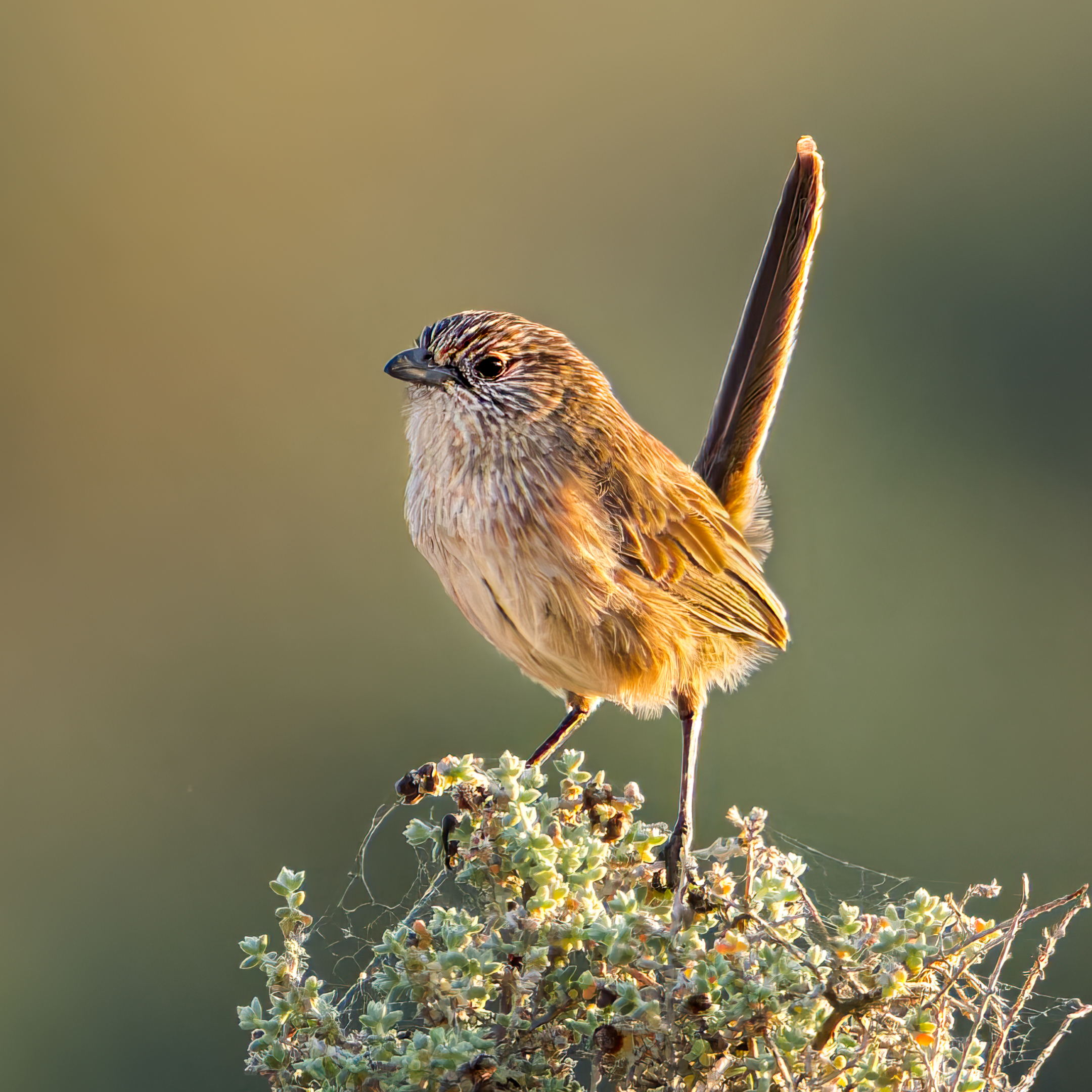
Thick-billed grasswren (Amytornis modestus), a threatened bird species living at the reserve

A survey of the Boolcoomatta Reserve's wildlife conducted in 2012 by a team of 50 volunteers found healthy bird populations and increasing numbers of marsupials and reptiles. Other threatened animal species present on the reserve include the slender-billed thornbill and thick-billed grasswren. There is habitat suitable for the yellow-footed rock wallaby, which is present on adjoining Bimbowrie Conservation Park.

The reserve is overlapped by part of the Boolcoomatta, Bindarrah and Kalkaroo Stations Important Bird Area which has been identified by BirdLife International as supporting a significant population of plains-wanderers.

== Protected area status ==
Boolcoomatta Reserve has protected area status within the Australian National Reserve System due to the property being subject to a conservation covenant where BHA has agreed to it being "reserved in perpetuity". The reserve is classified as an IUCN Category II protected area.

== See also ==
- Protected areas of South Australia
