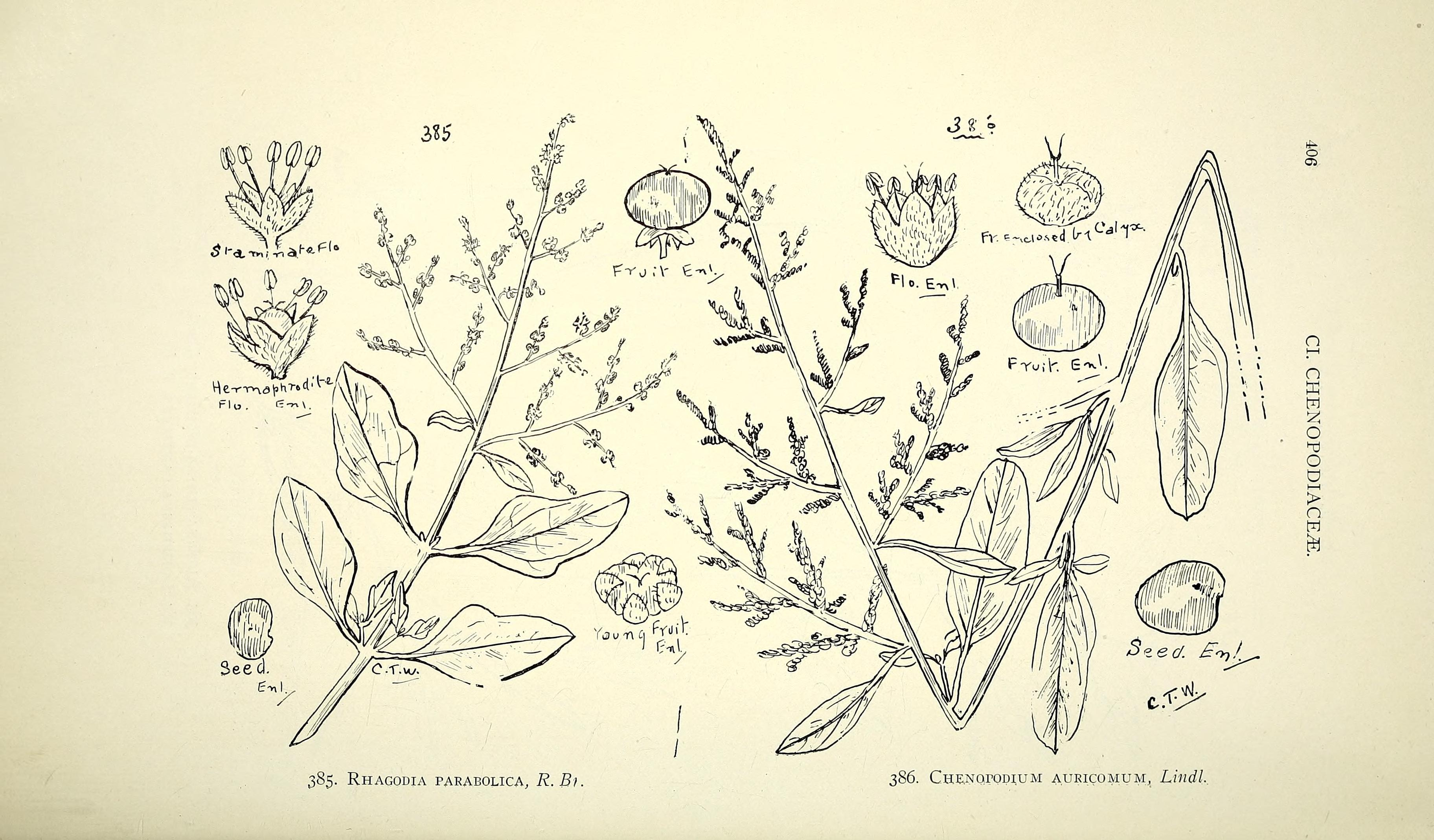
- Chenopodium parabolicum (left plant)

Scientific classification
- Kingdom: Plantae
- Clade: Embryophytes
- Clade: Tracheophytes
- Clade: Spermatophytes
- Clade: Angiosperms
- Clade: Eudicots
- Order: Caryophyllales
- Family: Amaranthaceae
- Genus: Chenopodium
- Species: C. parabolicum

Binomial name
- Chenopodium parabolicum (R.Br. ) S.Fuentes & Borsch

Synonyms
- Rhagodia parabolica R.Br.

= Chenopodium parabolicum =

Species of plant

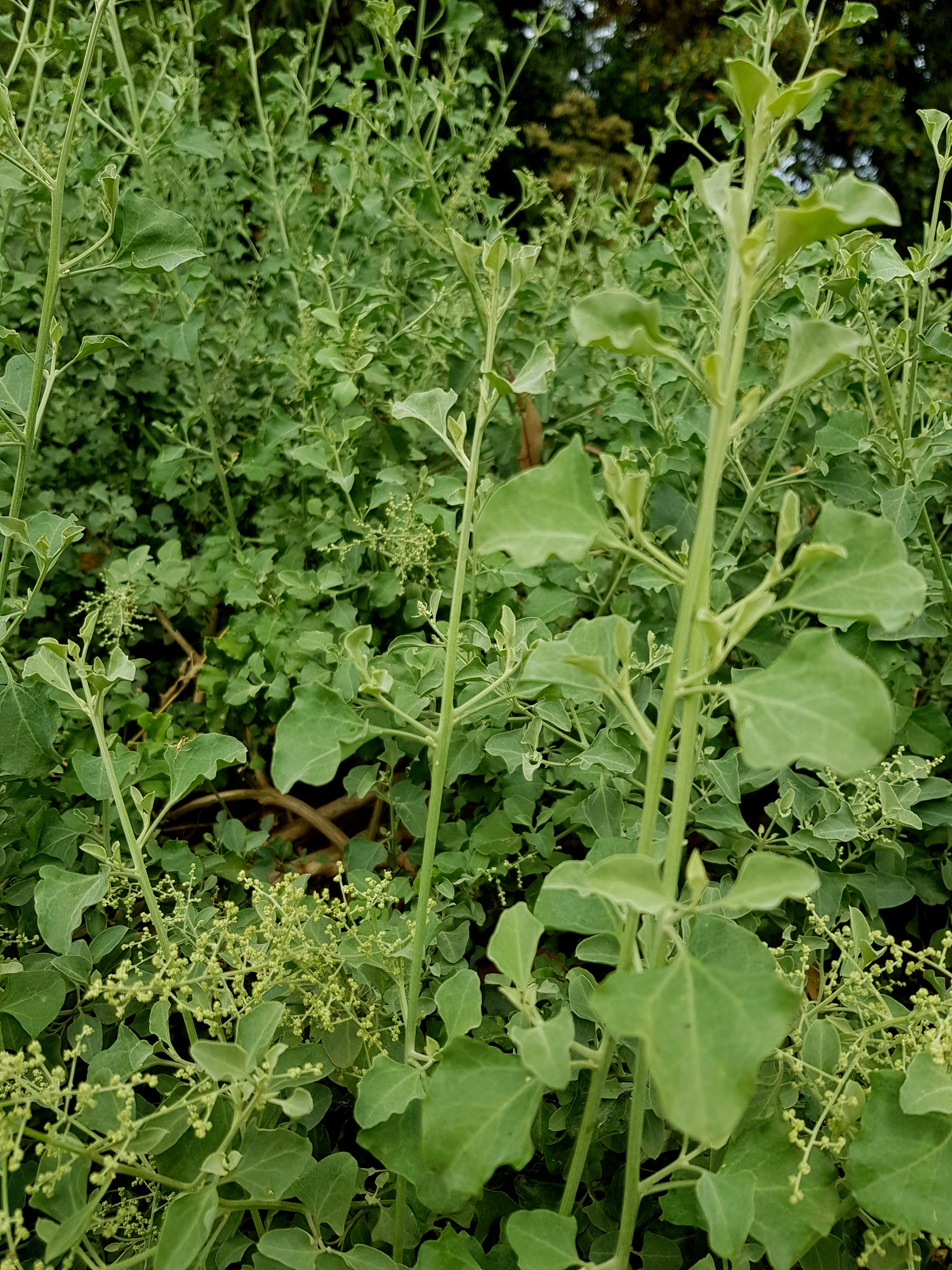
Chenopodium parabolicum.

Chenopodium parabolicum (Syn. Rhagodia parabolica), commonly known as fragrant saltbush or mealy saltbush, is a shrub in the family Amaranthaceae. The species is native to Australia.

The species was formally described in 1810 in Prodromus Florae Novae Hollandiae by botanist Robert Brown. In 2012, after phylogenetical research, it was reclassified as a species of Chenopodium, and assigned the name Chenopodium parabolicum (R.Br.) S.Fuentes & Borsch.

The species occurs in South Australia, Victoria, New South Wales and Queensland.
