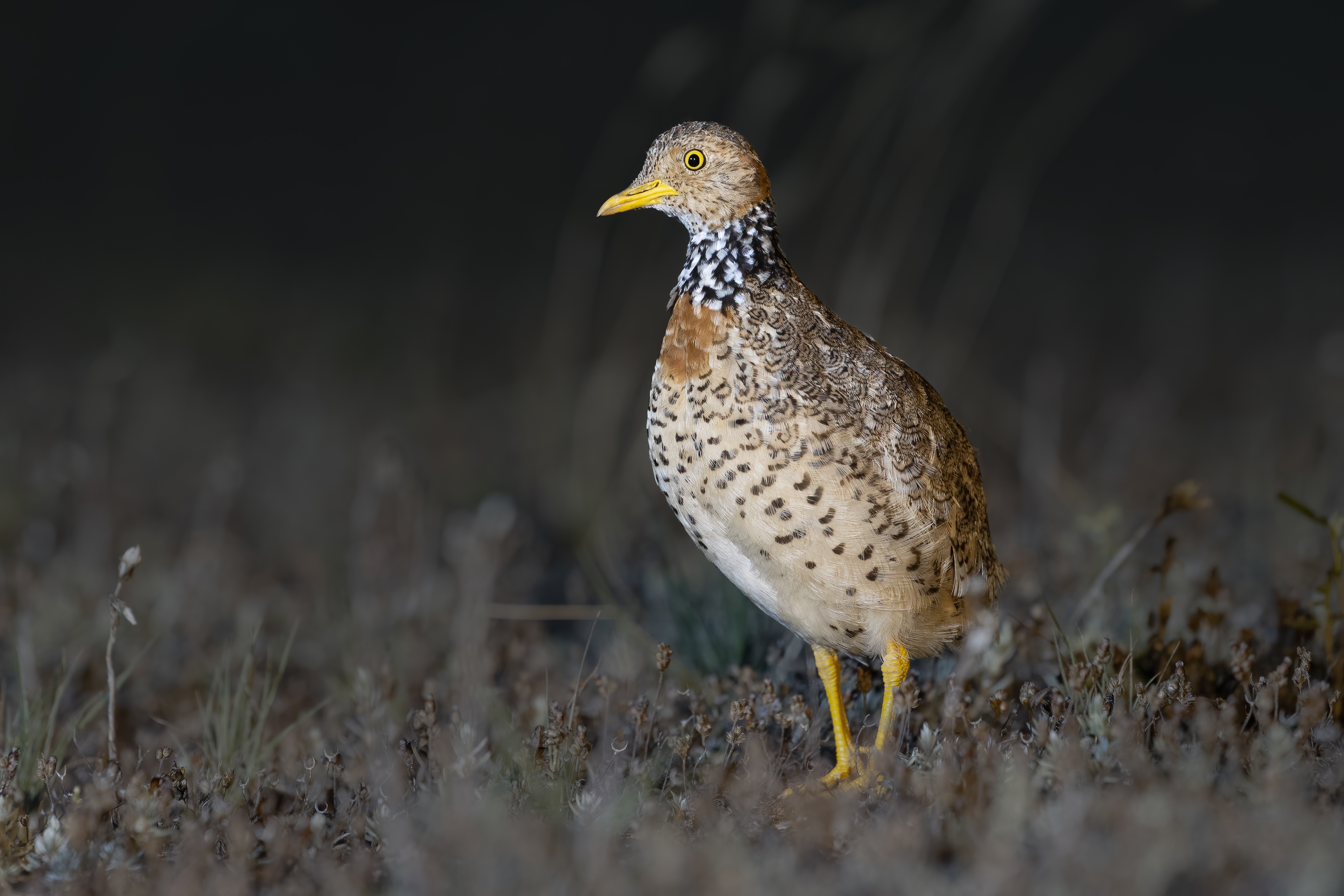
- Female
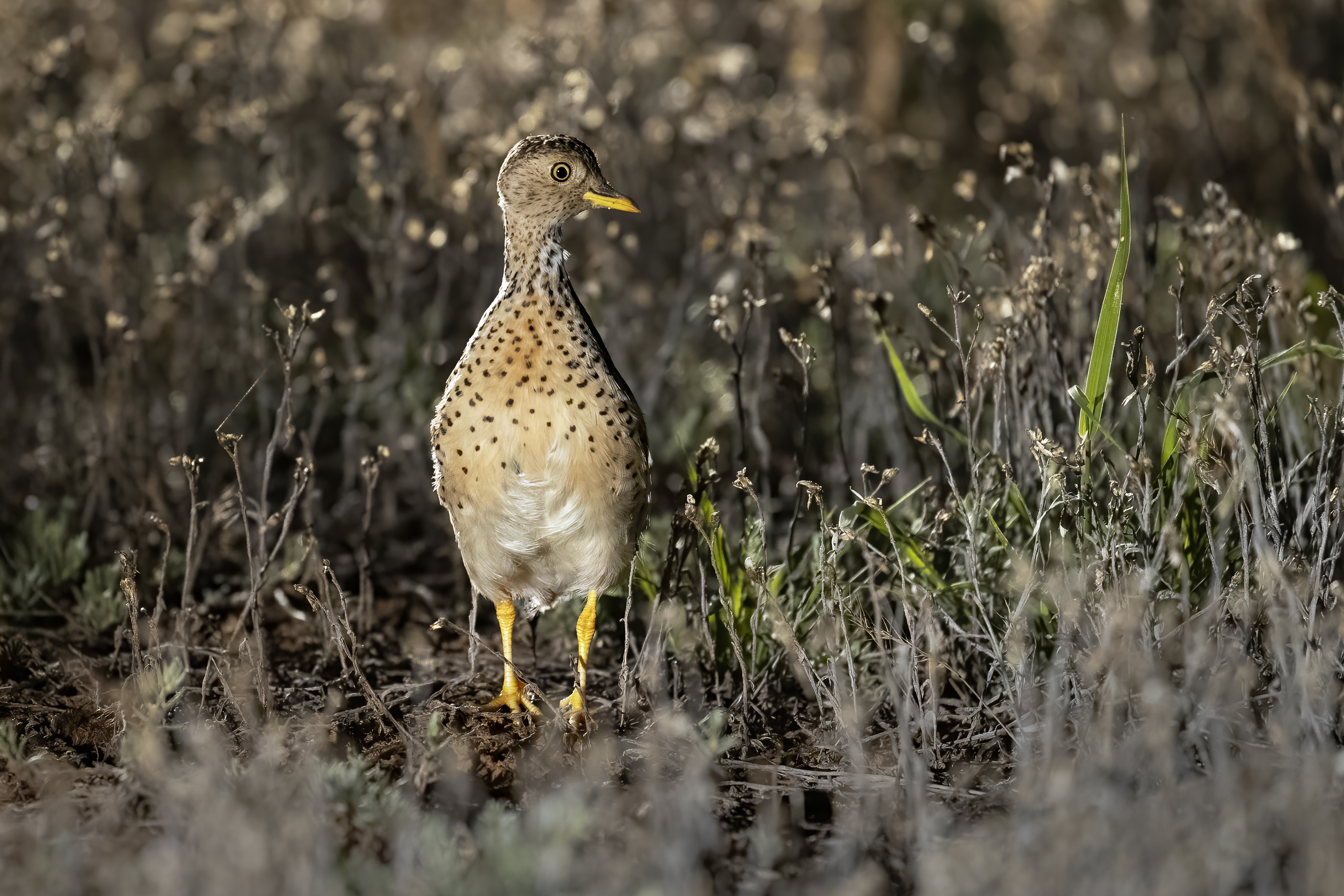
- Male

Conservation status
- Endangered (IUCN 3.1)

Scientific classification
- Kingdom: Animalia
- Phylum: Chordata
- Class: Aves
- Order: Charadriiformes
- Suborder: Scolopaci
- Family: Pedionomidae; Bonaparte, 1856
- Genus: Pedionomus; Gould, 1840
- Species: P. torquatus

Binomial name
- Pedionomus torquatus Gould, 1840

= Plains-wanderer =

Plains-wanderer Temporal range: Late Pleistocene–Present

Australian species of bird

The plains-wanderer (Pedionomus torquatus) is an atypical species of wading bird, the only representative of family Pedionomidae and genus Pedionomus. It is endemic to Australia. Its historic range included much of eastern Australia, including Victoria, New South Wales, South Australia and the Northern Territory, but in recent years, it has become endangered with remaining known populations concentrated in the Riverina region of New South Wales and western Queensland.

== Description ==
The plains-wanderer is a quail-like ground bird, measuring 15–19 cm. It is such an atypical bird that it is placed in an entire family of its own, Pedionomidae. The adult male is light brown above, with fawn-white underparts with black crescents. The adult female is substantially larger than the male, and has a distinctive, white-spotted black collar. They have excellent camouflage and will first hide at any disturbance. If approached too closely, they will run rather than fly, at which they are very poor. Females lay four eggs, which the male then incubates.

== Taxonomy ==
It was formerly believed to be related to the buttonquails and thus placed in the gamebird order Galliformes or with the cranes and rails in Gruiformes. DNA–DNA hybridization and RAG-1 sequence data places it as a wader related to the jacanas. It thus represents a remarkable case of morphological convergence, or perhaps it is simply extremely plesiomorphic in morphology (the buttonquails, meanwhile, having turned out to be a very basal offshoot of the wader radiation). In the latter case, this would mean that the jacanas, painted snipe and seedsnipes—all ecologically very different birds—all evolved from birds very similar to the living plains-wanderer.

== Status and conservation ==
Population decline has been caused by the conversion of native grasslands to cultivation and intensive predation by the introduced fox—the species' ground-nesting habits, poor flying ability, and tendency to run rather than fly from predators make it easy prey for the fox. Sites identified by BirdLife International as being important for plains-wanderer conservation are Boolcoomatta, Bindarrah and Kalkaroo Stations in north-eastern South Australia, Diamantina and Astrebla Grasslands in western Queensland, Patho Plains in northern Victoria and the Riverina Plains in New South Wales.

A crucial aspect of Plains-wanderer conservation is their habitat needs. They require grasslands with both open and denser vegetation for foraging and roosting, which is essential for their survival and recovery.

=== International ===
This bird is listed as Endangered on the 2022 IUCN Red List.

=== Australia ===
Plains-wanderers are listed as critically endangered under the Australian Environment Protection and Biodiversity Conservation Act 1999 (EPBC Act). Their conservation status varies from state to state within Australia:

- New South Wales: Endangered, under the Biodiversity Conservation Act 2016 (NSW) (February 2022 list)
- Queensland: Critically Endangered, under Nature Conservation (Animals) Regulation 2020 (November 2021 list)
- South Australia: Endangered, under the National Parks and Wildlife Act 1972 (January 2020 list)
- Victoria: Critically Endangered, under the Flora and Fauna Guarantee Act 1988 (October 2021 list)

A 2018 study ranked it sixth in a list of Australian birds most likely to go extinct.

=== Conservation efforts ===
A captive population was established in late 2018 within a purpose-built facility containing 30 aviaries at Taronga Western Plains Zoo in Dubbo. These captive individuals will form an insurance population as part of a breed-and-release program to support the wild population, as part of the national conservation plan for the species.

== See also ==
- Pualco Range Conservation Park
