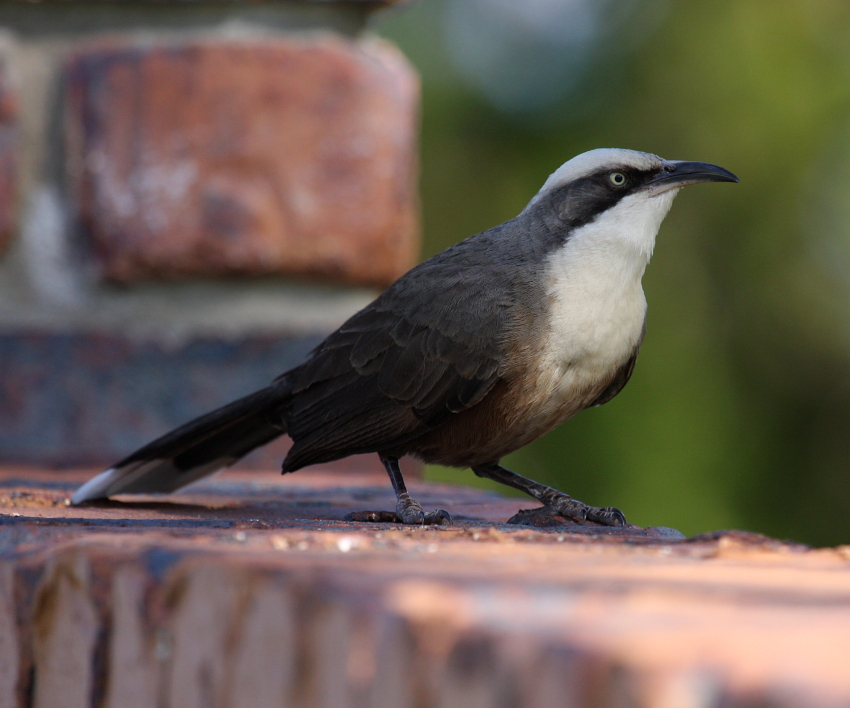
- ssp. temporalis
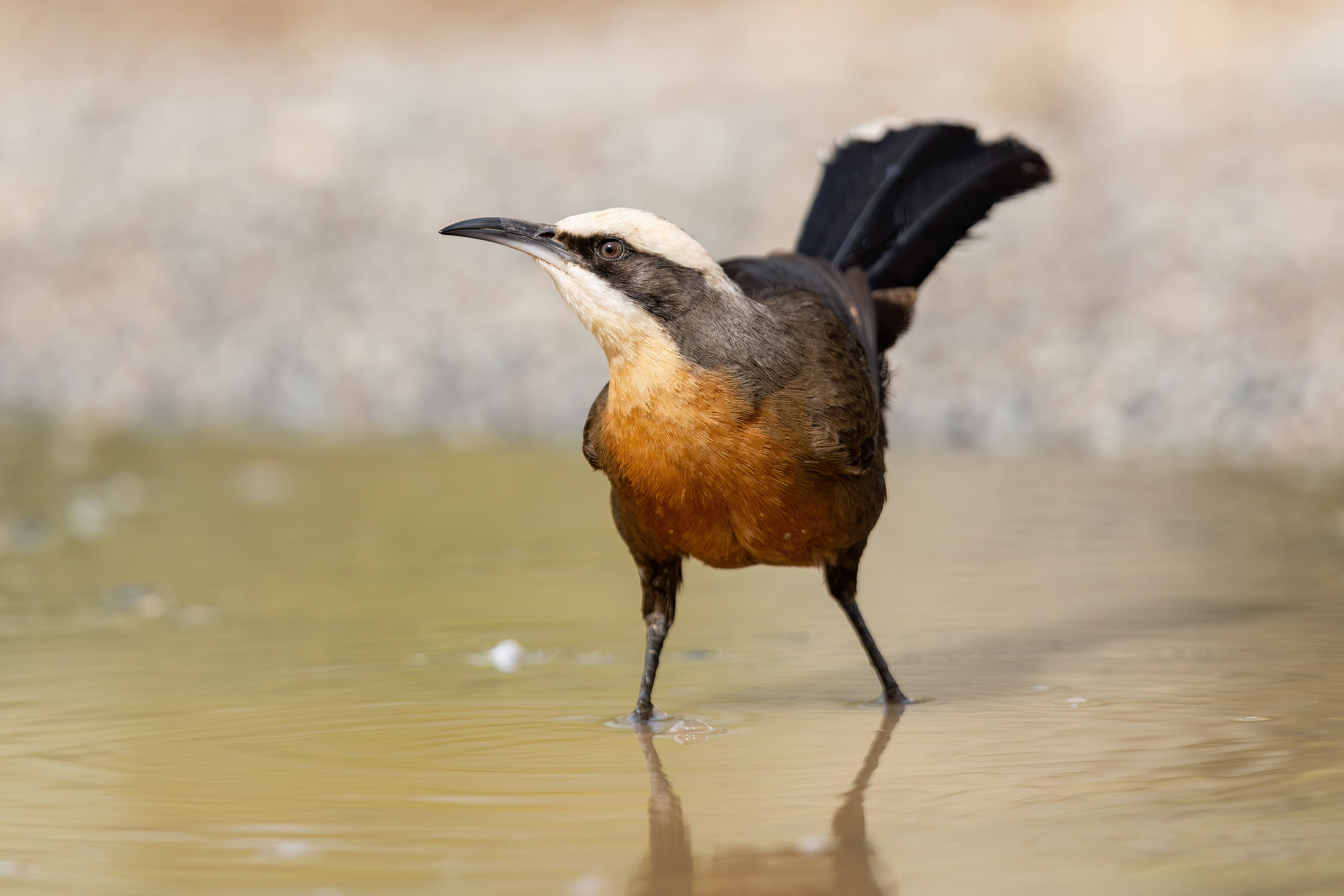
- ssp. rubeculus

Conservation status
- Least Concern (IUCN 3.1)

Scientific classification
- Kingdom: Animalia
- Phylum: Chordata
- Class: Aves
- Order: Passeriformes
- Family: Pomatostomidae
- Genus: Pomatostomus
- Species: P. temporalis

Binomial name
- Pomatostomus temporalis (Vigors & Horsfield, 1827)

= Grey-crowned babbler =

Species of bird

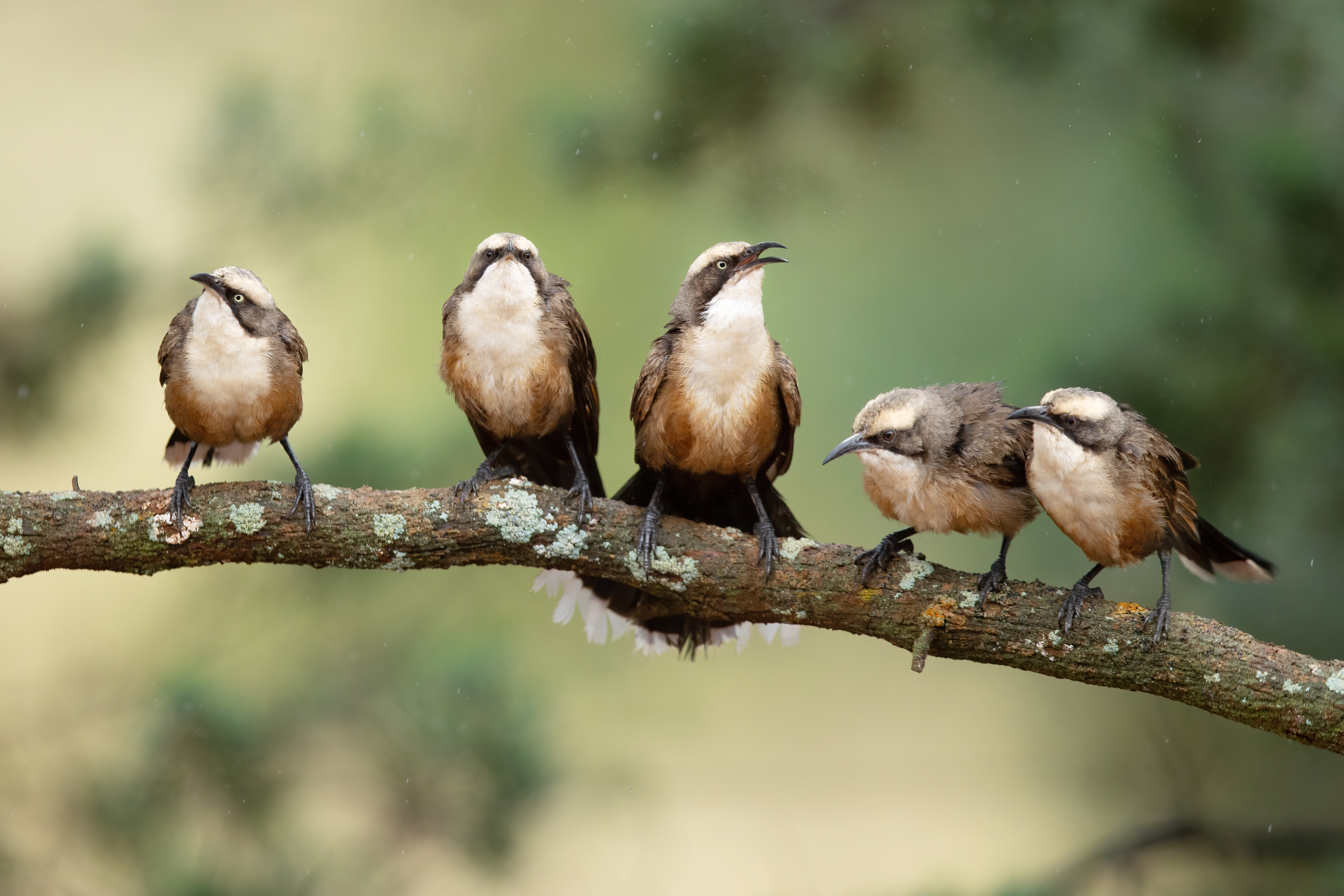
Small flock of grey-crowned babblers (P. t. temporalis), New South Wales

The grey-crowned babbler (Pomatostomus temporalis) is a species of bird in the family Pomatostomidae. They are found in Australia and New Guinea (Indonesia and Papua New Guinea). Its habitats include tropical and subtropical dry broadlife forests, tropical moist lowland forests, shrublands, and savannas.

== Taxonomy ==
Two subspecies are recognized within Australia and New Guinea.

Pomatostomus temporalis temporalis – This subspecies occurs within Australia in the states of Victoria, eastern Queensland (including Cape York), New South Wales and south-eastern South Australia. It is a vagrant or accidental visitor to the Australian Capital Territory. It is also the subspecies believed to occur within New Guinea.

Pomoatostomus temporalis rubeculus – This subspecies occurs in Australia within the states of Western Australia, Northern Territory, western Queensland and a small area of northern South Australia.

The breast color is usually used as the distinguishing morphological character between the subspecies, with a creamy white breast grading to mid-grey in P. t. temporalis and a mid-to deep-rufous brown breast in P. t. rubeculus. Other differences relate to brow coloration, facial bands through the eye, tail length, and overall size. A zone of intergradation occurs between the two subspecies in north-central Queensland.

== Naming ==
The Yuwaalaraay people of northern New South Wales use the name dhadhalurraa to refer to this species. A number of alternate names have been provided for the grey-crowned babbler.

- Yahoo – This popular alternate name is based on the distinctive call of the grey-crowned babbler. The source of this name is unclear.
- Grey-crowned chatterer – Name given by A. J. North
- Happy-jack – Popular name, quoted by A. J. North and others, relating to the species habit of moving about in 'talkative' family groups. Source of this name is not known.
- Dog-bird, barker, barking-bird – Popular names whose sources are not known. Presumably named due to cackling soft tuk note.

== Conservation status ==
=== Australia ===
There are numerous lists of threatened fauna from within Australia. The official list of threatened species on the Australian Environment Protection and Biodiversity Conservation Act 1999 does not consider the grey-crowned babbler (either as a species or subspecies) to be threatened.

From other sources, the national status of the grey-crowned babbler varies. The eastern subspecies is increasingly being considered threatened, although not by all:

- The Directory of Australian Birds considers both subspecies of the grey-crowned babbler to be secure.
- The Action Plan for Australian Birds 2000 considers the eastern subspecies (P. t. temporalis) to be near-threatened. Within this document, this subspecies was considered to be near-threatened using criteria 'a' of Maxwell et al. (1996). That is, this subspecies has disappeared from over 50% of its former area of occupancy and/or extent of occurrence and are at risk of further decline. Although there has been little evident change at the northern edge of its range, the subspecies has been declining noticeably in the southern half of its range
- The Action Plan for Australian Birds 2000 considers the north-western subspecies (P. t. rubeculus) to be of least concern.

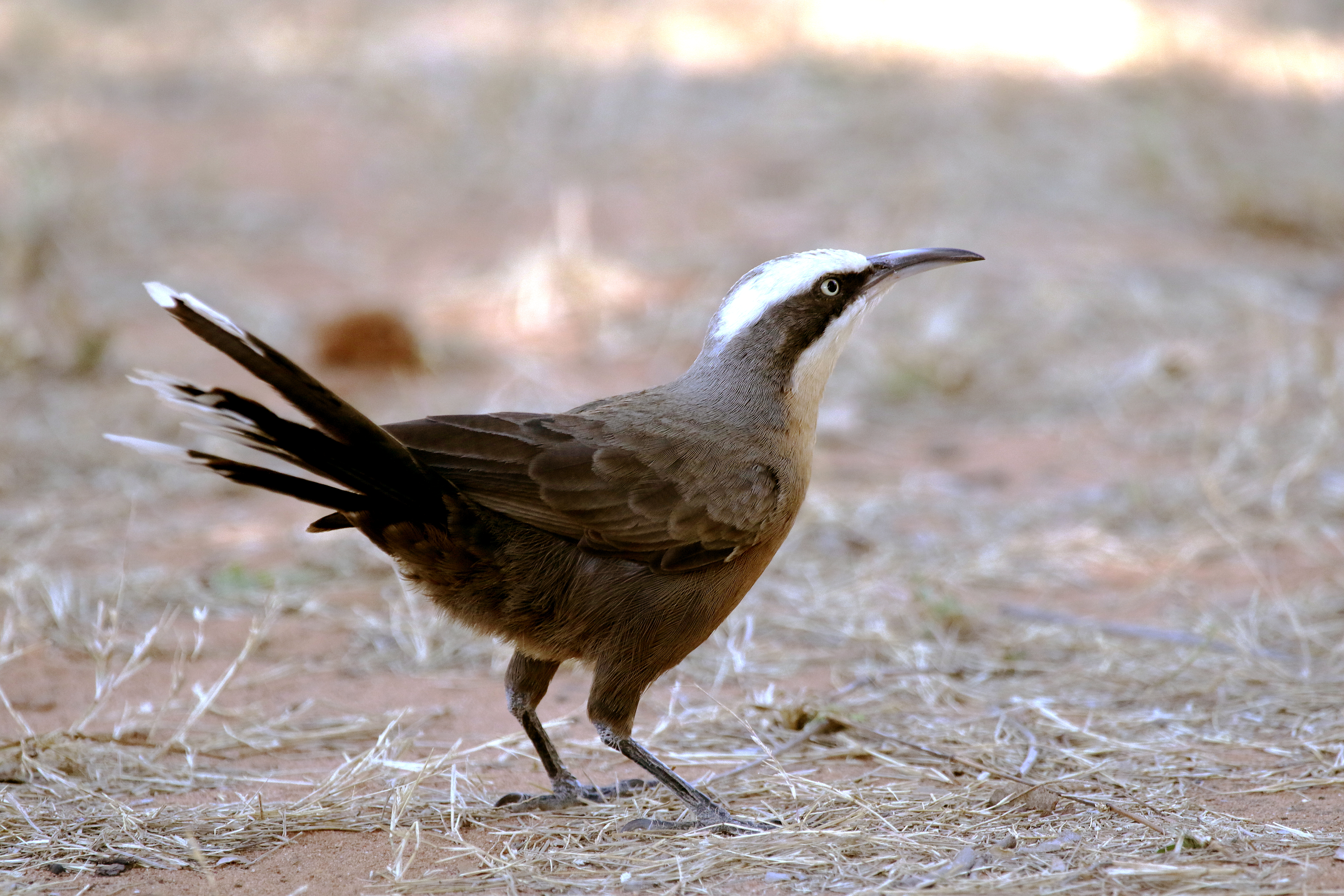
Grey-crowned babbler at Katherine, Northern Territory

=== States of Australia ===
The conservation status of the grey-crowned babbler varies from state to state within Australia. For example:

- The grey-crowned babbler is listed as threatened on the Victorian Flora and Fauna Guarantee Act (1988). Under this Act, an Action Statement for the recovery and future management of this species has been prepared. On the 2007 advisory list of threatened vertebrate fauna in Victoria, the grey-crowned babbler is listed as endangered.
- The eastern subspecies of the grey-crowned babbler (P. t. temporalis) is listed as vulnerable on the NSW Threatened Species Conservation Act 1995. This is the only subspecies occurring within NSW.
- The grey-crowned babbler is listed on schedule 9 (rare species) of the South Australian National Parks and Wildlife Act 1972.
- The grey-crowned babbler is not listed as a threatened species on the Western Australian Wildlife Conservation Act 1953.
- The grey-crowned babbler is listed as least conservation on the Queensland Nature Conservation Act 1992.

=== Threats ===
The key process that has led to the decline of the eastern subspecies of the grey-crowned babbler has been the historic loss and fragmentation of its preferred woodland habitat. Grey-crowned babblers generally have a poor ability to migrate across unsuitable habitats. As a consequence of fragmentation, breeding success and group size decline. Babbler groups are more susceptible to stochastic events leading to local extinction. Once a fragment has lost its population of grey-crowned babblers, natural recolonisation rarely occurs because of the species' poor dispersal ability.

Rush Creek, SE Queensland
