= Charles Nutting =

Charles Nutting may refer to:

- Charles Cleveland Nutting (1858–1927), American zoologist
- Charles William Nutting (1889–1964), British air marshal

== See also ==
- Nutting (disambiguation)
