= Nutting =

Nutting is an English surname, first recorded in 1379, when a Willelmus Nuttyng (William Nutting) is mentioned in the Poll Tax rolls of Yorkshire.

== People ==
- Alissa Nutting, American writer
- Sir Anthony Nutting, 3rd Baronet (1920–1999), British diplomat and politician
- Armine Nutting Gosling (1861–1942), Newfoundland suffragist and social reformer
- Charles Cleveland Nutting (1858–1927), American zoologist
- Charles William Nutting (1889–1964), British air marshal
- Dave Nutting, video game designer
- David Nutting (RAF), British RAF squadron leader officer during the Second World War D-Day landings
- John (Jack) Gurney Nutting (1871–1946), principal of coachbuilders J Gurney Nutting & Co Limited
- John Nutting (radio presenter), Australian radio presenter
- John Nutting (politician) (born 1949), American politician
- Leslie Nutting (born 1945), American politician
- Mary Adelaide Nutting (1858–1948), American nurse and educator
- Newton W. Nutting (1840–1889), American politician
- Nutting Baronets, title in the Baronetage of the United Kingdom
- Perley G. Nutting (1873–1949), American optical physicist
- Rex Nutting, American journalist and economist
- Bob Nutting (born 1962), American businessman
- Wallace Nutting (1861–1941), American minister, photographer, artist, and antiquarian
- Wallace H. Nutting (1928–2023), United States Army general

== See also ==
- Nutting Associates, arcade game manufacturer
