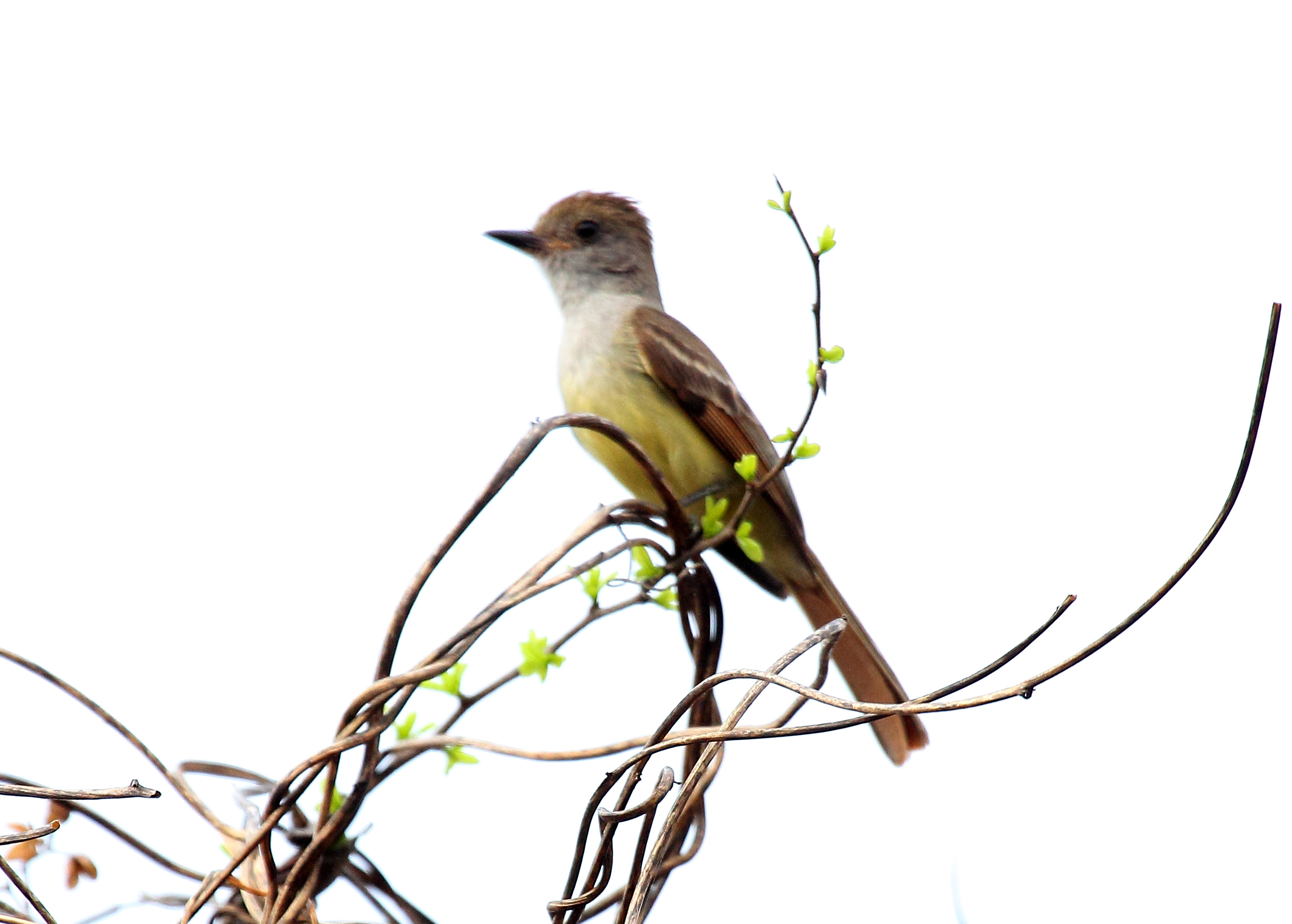

Scientific classification
- Kingdom: Animalia
- Phylum: Chordata
- Class: Aves
- Order: Passeriformes
- Family: Tyrannidae
- Genus: Myiarchus
- Species: M. flavidior

Binomial name
- Myiarchus flavidior van Rossem, 1936

= Salvadoran flycatcher =

Species of bird

Salvadoran flycatcher (Myiarchus flavidior) is a passerine bird in the family Tyrannidae, the tyrant flycatchers. It is found from eastern Oaxaca in Mexico into western Nicaragua. It was formerly considered a subspecies of Nutting's flycatcher and prior to that, a subspecies of Ash-throated flycatcher before being split by the IOC and Clement's checklist in 2025.

== Taxonomy ==
It was first described in 1936 by ornithologist Adriaan van Rossem from a male holotype collected at Lago Olomega in El Salvador, and was described as a subspecies of Ash-throated flycatcher as Myiarchus cinerascens flavidior. It was later, during the 1960s placed as a subspecies of Nutting's flycatcher and in 2025 it was split into a distinct species. It is considered monotypic.

== Description ==
The Salvadoran flycatcher can most easily be told apart from its close relative Nutting's flycatcher by range. However the two also have vocal distinctions and some differences in preferred habitat.
