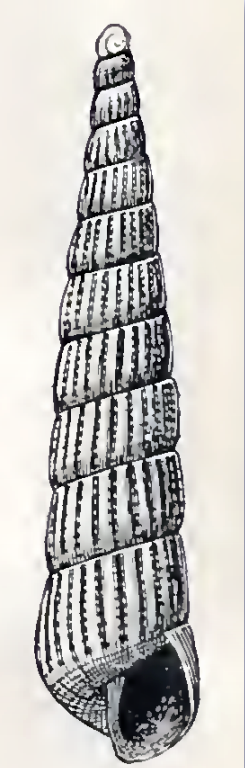
- Drawing of a shell of Turbonilla nuttingi

Scientific classification
- Kingdom: Animalia
- Phylum: Mollusca
- Class: Gastropoda
- Family: Pyramidellidae
- Genus: Turbonilla
- Species: T. nuttingi

Binomial name
- Turbonilla nuttingi Dall & Bartsch, 1909

Synonyms
- Turbonilla (Pyrgiscus) nuttingi Dall & Bartsch, 1909

= Turbonilla nuttingi =

Species of gastropod

Turbonilla nuttingi is a species of sea snail, a marine gastropod mollusk in the family Pyramidellidae, the pyrams and their allies.

This species was named for the American zoologist Charles Cleveland Nutting (1858-1927)

== Description ==
The shell is long and slender. Its length measures 12.3 mm. It is wax yellow on the posterior half between the sutures but light brown on the anterior and the periphery. The 2½ whorls of the protoconch are large. They formi a depressed helicoid spire, the axis of which is at right angles to that of the succeeding turns, in the first of which it is about one-fifth immersed. The eleven whorls of the teleoconch are moderately well rounded and slightly shouldered at the summit. They are marked by strong, broad, well rounded, somewhat protractive axial ribs, of which 20 occur upon the first to sixth, 22 upon the seventh to ninth, and 24 upon the penultimate turn. These ribs extend prominently from the summit to the periphery of the whorls, but do not cross the latter. The intercostal spaces are very narrow, not more than half the width of the ribs. The anterior half between the sutures is marked by five equal and equally spaced spiral grooves. The posterior half is marked by two which equal those on the anterior half in strength, but are a little more distantly spaced, and six fine incised lines which divide the space posterior to the last groove. The sutures are somewhat constricted. The periphery of the body whorl is well rounded. The base of the shell is short and well rounded. It is marked by nine slender incised spiral lines, which are successively a little closer spaced from the periphery to the umbilical region. The aperture is rhomboid. The posterior angle is obtuse. The outer lip is thin, showing the external marldngs within. The columella is slender, somewhat curved and slightly revolute.

== Distribution ==
The type specimen was found in the Pacific Ocean off San Diego, California.
