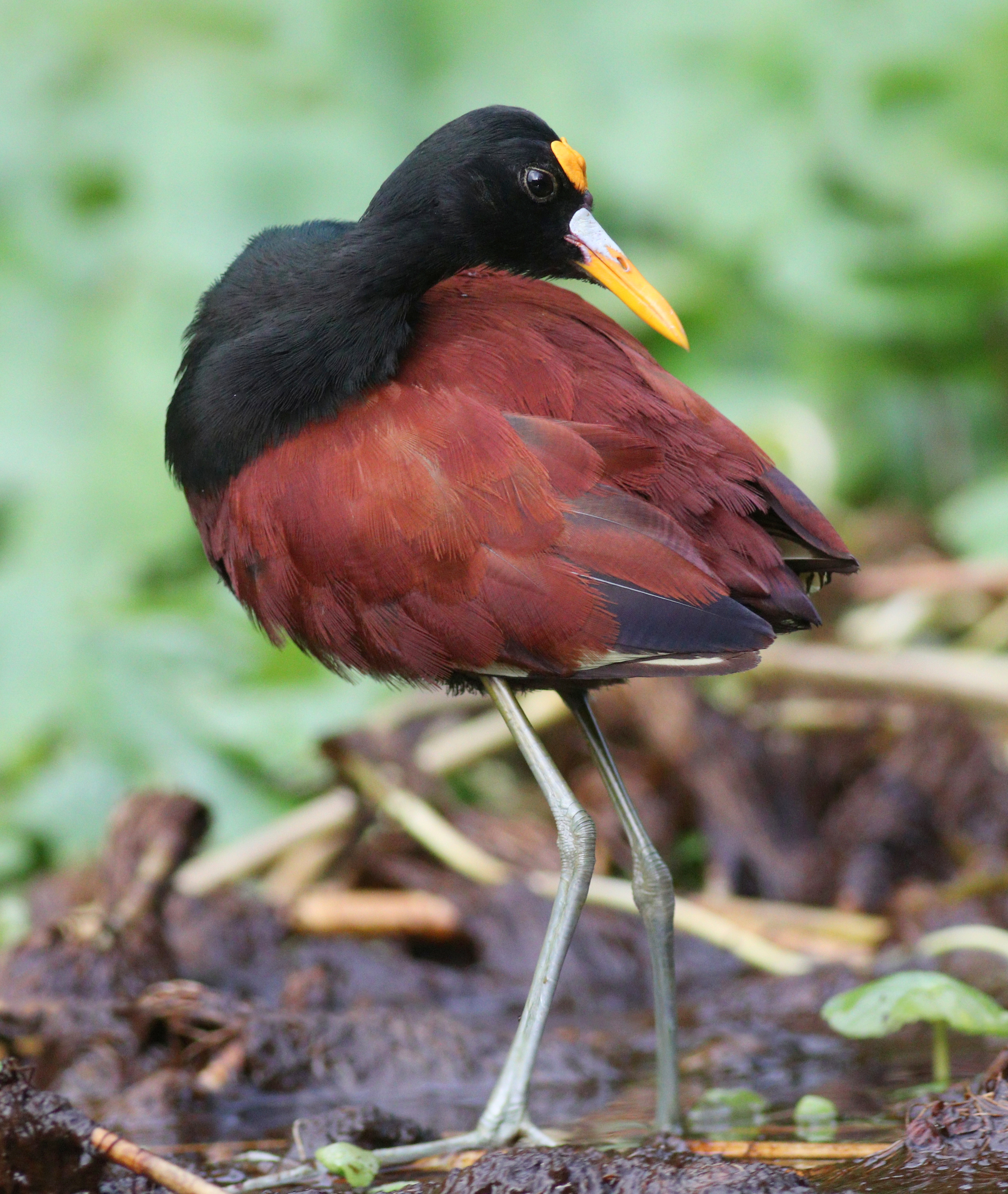
- In Tortuguero National Park, Costa Rica

Conservation status
- Least Concern (IUCN 3.1)

Scientific classification
- Kingdom: Animalia
- Phylum: Chordata
- Class: Aves
- Order: Charadriiformes
- Family: Jacanidae
- Genus: Jacana
- Species: J. spinosa

Binomial name
- Jacana spinosa (Linnaeus, 1758)

Synonyms
- Fulica spinosa Linnaeus, 1758; Parra variabilis Linnaeus, 1766; Parra jacana Shaw, 1824; Parra cordifera Lesson, 1842

= Northern jacana =

Species of bird

The northern jacana or northern jaçana (Jacana spinosa) is a wader which is known as a resident breeder from coastal Mexico to western Panama, and on Cuba, Jamaica and Hispaniola in the Caribbean. It is sometimes known to breed in Texas, United States, and has also been recorded on several occasions as a vagrant in Arizona. The jacanas are a group of wetland birds, which are identifiable by their huge feet and claws, which enable them to walk on floating vegetation in the shallow lakes that are their preferred habitat. In Jamaica, this bird is also known as the 'Jesus bird', as it appears to walk on water.

== Taxonomy ==
The northern jacana was formally described in 1758 by the Swedish naturalist Carl Linnaeus in the tenth edition of his Systema Naturae. He placed it with the coots in the genus Fulica and coined the binomial name Fulica spinosa. Linnaeus based his account on the "spur-winged water hen" that had been described and illustrated in 1743 by the English naturalist George Edwards in his A Natural History of Uncommon Birds. Edwards had borrowed a specimen from the collector Hans Sloane that had been preserved in alcohol. Edwards mistakenly believed his specimen had been collected near the city of Cartagena in northern Colombia but this was an error as the species is not present there. The type locality has therefore been redefined as Panama. The northern jacana is now placed together with the wattled jacana in the genus Jacana that was introduced in 1760 by the French zoologist Mathurin Jacques Brisson. The species is treated as monotypic: no subspecies are recognised. The proposed races violacea, gymnostoma and lowi are not recognised. The genus name is from the Portuguese word Jaçana for the wattled jacana, which is in turn derived from the Tupi name Yassānā or Yahānā for a noisy waterbird. The specific epithet spinosa is Latin meaning "thorny", from spina meaning "thorn".

== Description ==
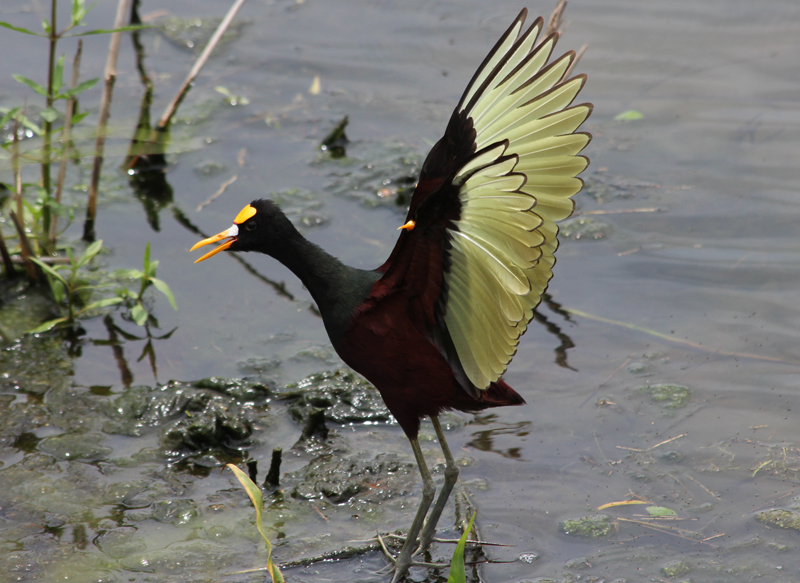
Showing the pale yellow-green wing feathers

The northern jacana is medium-sized wader with long legs and elongated toes. It measures 21.5 to 24 cm (8.5 to 9.4 in) in overall length. The female is significantly larger than the male: breeding females average 161 g (5.7 oz) compared to 91 g (3.2 oz) for the male. It has a chestnut-maroon body with a black head, neck and breast. The bill is bright yellow as is the fleshy shield at the base of the forehead. The upper mandible has a white base. When in flight, its yellowish-green primary and secondary wing feathers are visible. Also visible are yellow bony spurs on the leading edge of the wings, which it can use to defend itself and its young. Young jacana chicks are covered in down and have patterns of orange, browns, black and some white on them. Older chicks are gray and have brownish upper parts. Juveniles have a white supercilium and white lores.

== Distribution and habitat ==
The northern jacana ranges from Mexico to Panama, although it occasionally visits the southern United States, with vagrants being seen in places such as Arizona. It lives on floating vegetation in swamps, marshes, and ponds.

== Behavior and ecology ==
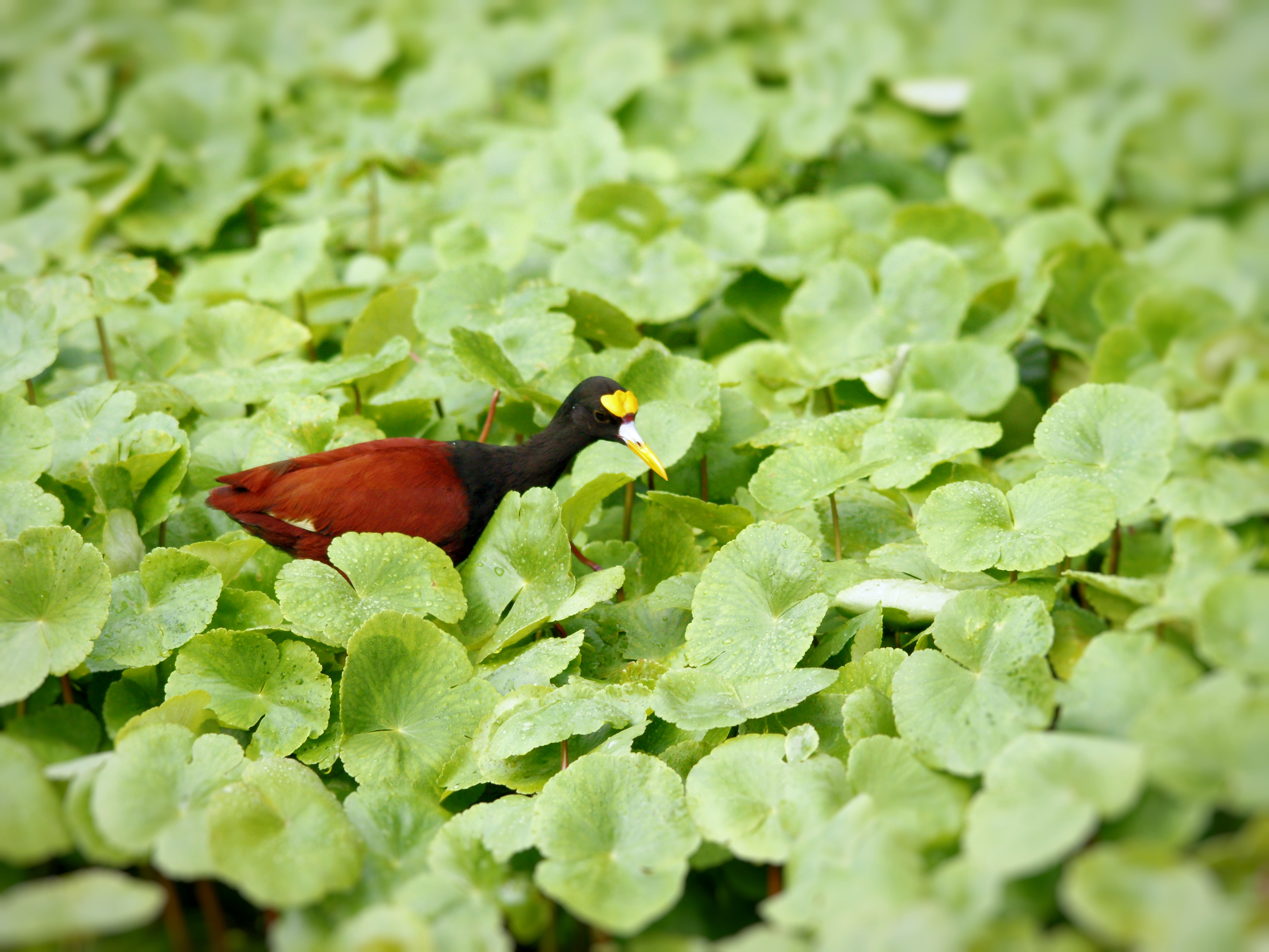
Northern jacana foraging at Tortuguero, Costa Rica

=== Feeding ===
The northern jacana feeds on insects on the surface of vegetation and ovules of water lilies. It also consumes snails, worms, small crabs, fish, mollusks, and seeds. The jacana competes with birds of a similar diet like the sora.

=== Breeding ===
The northern jacana is unusual among birds in having a polyandrous breeding system. A female jacana lives in a territory that encompasses the territories of 1–4 males. A male forms a social bond with a female who will keep other females out of the territory. These bonds between the female and her males remain throughout the year, even outside of the breeding season. These relationships last until a male or female is replaced. The female maintains bonds with her mates though copulations and producing clutches for them, as well as by protecting their territories and defending the eggs from predators. Monogamous pairs are sometimes observed, but typically the jacana has a simultaneous polyandrous mating system. That is the female will mate with several males a day or form bonds with more than one male at a time. Due to the high energy costs of producing eggs, females are replaced more often than males. If water levels remain constant, jacanas can breed year round.

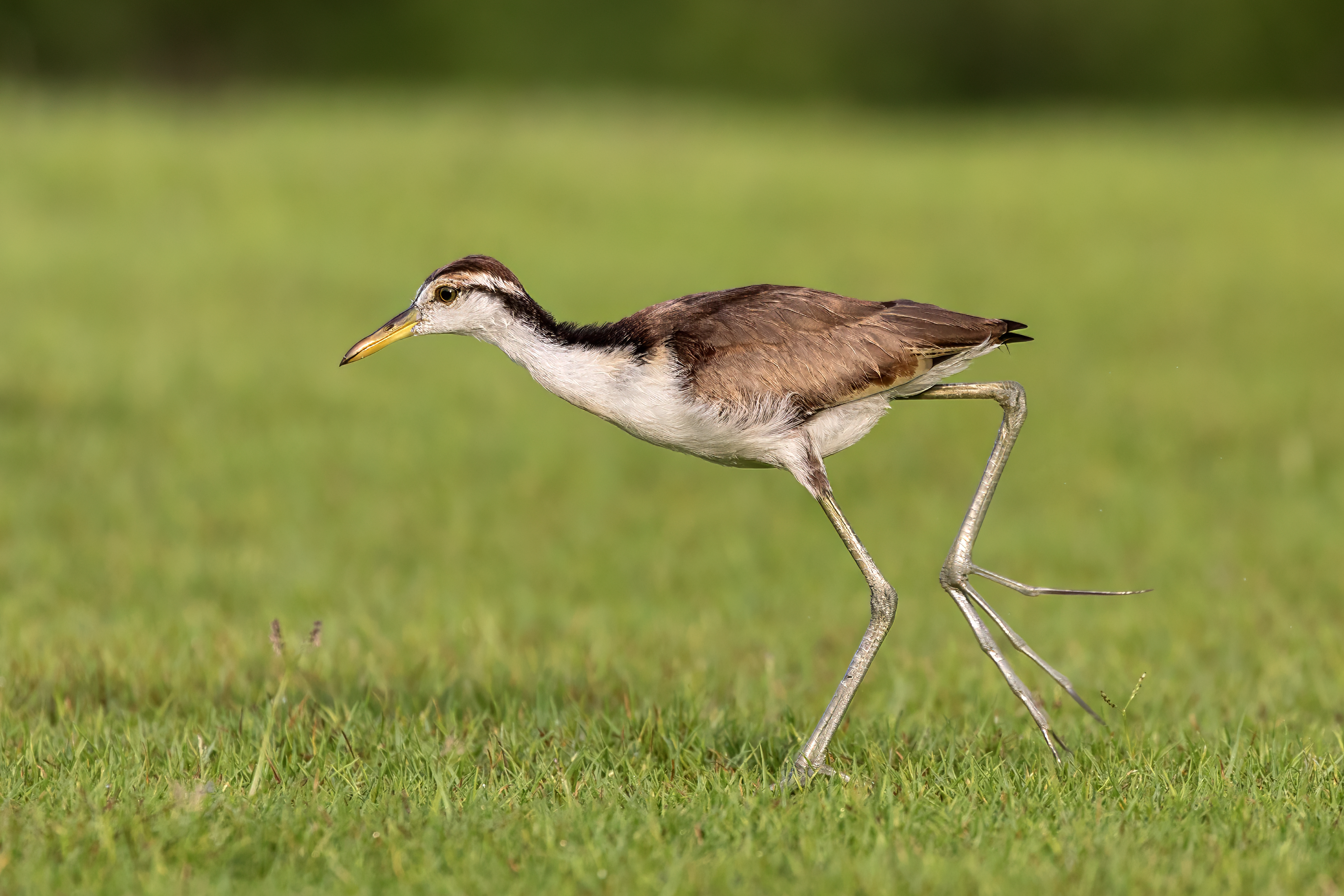
Juvenile northern jacana

The male constructs a floating nest with whatever plant matter he can find. A male jacana will grab vegetation and walk backwards to uproot it and continues to walk backward to drop the plant part in the nest. The male pushes against and steps on the plant parts to create a compact mount. The best nests are ones that are the most dense and stable. A male may create several nests at different sites and the female may choose one or find a site of her own in the territory.

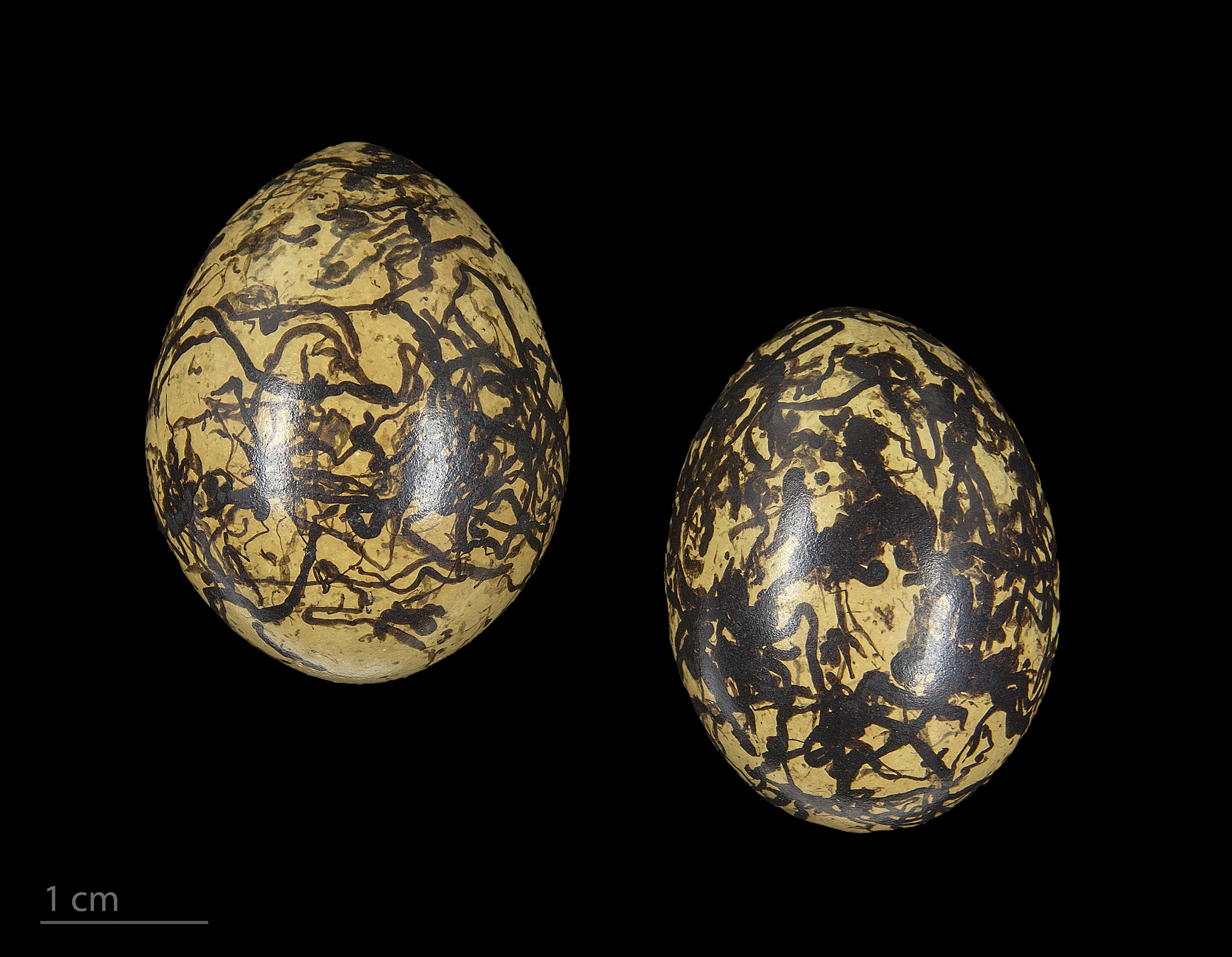
Jacana spinosa - MHNT

This bird lays a clutch of four brown eggs with black markings. These eggs usually measure around 30 by 23 millimetres (1.18 by 0.91 in). The male incubates the eggs for 28 days. A female may sometimes shade and squat over the eggs but rarely incubate them. A female may reluctantly incubate the eggs if a male does not have sufficient time to forage throughout the day due to rain and cool temperatures. Males spend most of their time within their territory during incubation but sometimes leave the nest unattended for long periods of time. A male performs when each egg hatches and stands next to the nest to peer into it. The males continues to incubate the remaining eggs while brooding the hatched chicks. When all the eggs have hatched, the male will dispose of the remaining egg shells. It will also lead the chicks away from the nest within the next 24 hours.

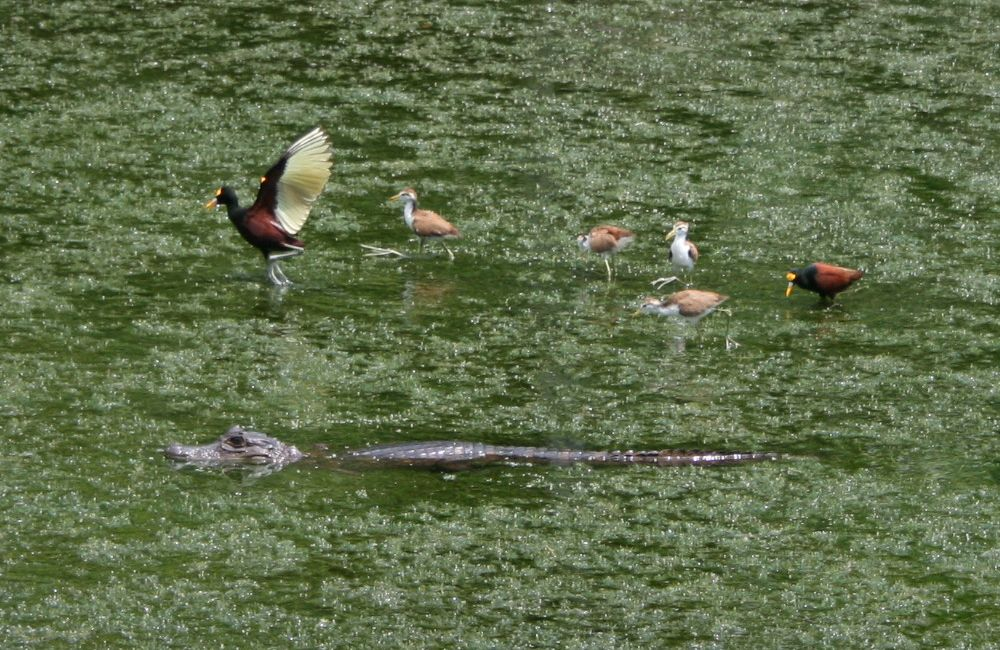
Jacana pair and chick near a caiman

Chicks are able to swim, dive and feed shortly after they hatch. The male will not feed the chicks but lead them to food. The male will brood the chicks for many weeks. As the chicks get bigger, fewer can fit under the male's wing. Females may brood chicks when the male is away. Territorial defense for both males and females increases when the chicks are born. Males are intolerant of intruders in their territory and make calls to the female for help for predator defense. Females respond to every call the male makes and invest much interest in the safety of the chicks, despite having little interaction with them. The females provide the males with a new clutch when the chicks are 12–16 weeks old.

=== Predation ===
Predators of the jacana include snakes, caimans, snapping turtles and various large birds and mammals.

=== Vocalizations ===
Vocalizations among jacanas usually occur between mating pairs or between fathers and their young. Jacanas will emit "clustered-note calls", which are made of individual notes clustered together, when jacanas attack intruders in their territories. Jacanas also made calls when eggs or chicks are under threat by predators. The notes and their pattern depend on the urgency of the threat. Calls are also made on flight, when a female is away from the territory too long or if a male cannot find a chick.

== Status ==
Northern jacanas appear to be common throughout most of their range, but could become vulnerable with loss of wetlands.
