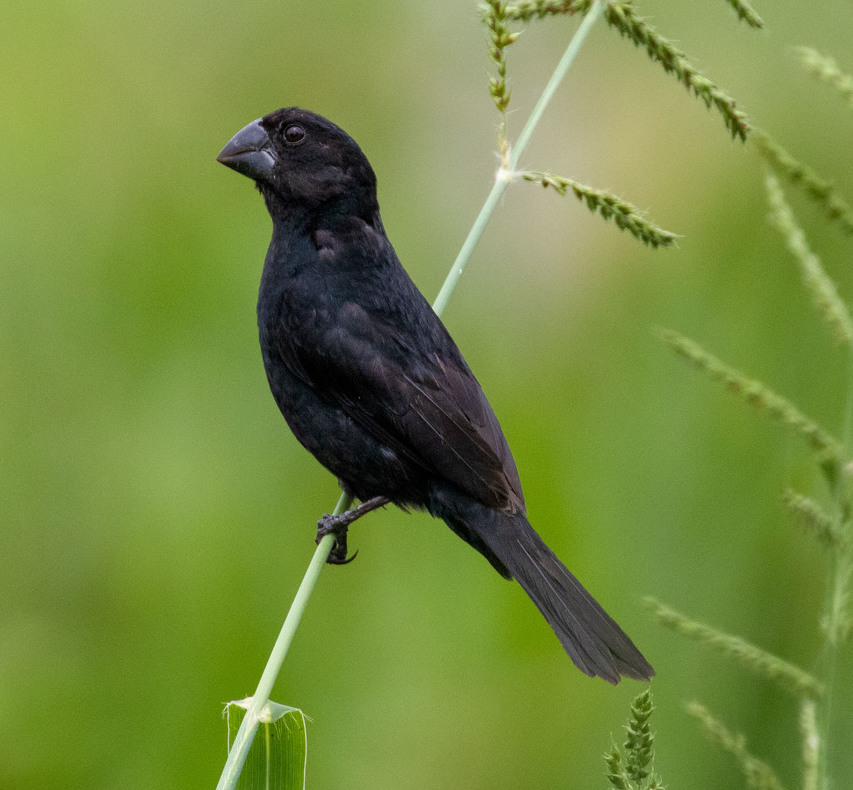

Conservation status
- Least Concern (IUCN 3.1)

Scientific classification
- Kingdom: Animalia
- Phylum: Chordata
- Class: Aves
- Order: Passeriformes
- Family: Thraupidae
- Genus: Sporophila
- Species: S. atrirostris

Binomial name
- Sporophila atrirostris (Sclater, PL & Salvin, 1878)

= Black-billed seed finch =

Species of bird

The black-billed seed finch (Sporophila atrirostris) is a species of bird in the family Thraupidae, the tanagers and allies. It is found in Bolivia, Colombia, Ecuador, and Peru.

== Taxonomy and systematics ==
The black-billed seed finch has a complicated taxonomic history. It was formally described in 1878 with the binomial Oryzoborus atrirostris. At the time Oryzoborus was a member of the family Fringillidae. By 1970 the genus had been assigned to the family Emberizidae. However, by that time the two subspecies of O. atrirostris had been reassigned as subspecies of the large-billed seed finch (O. crassirostris). By 2007 Oryzoborus atrirostris had been restored as a full species. Based on studies published between 1988 and 2011, beginning in 2012 Oryzoborus was moved to the tanager family Thraupidae. In 2014 taxonomic systems began merging Oryzoborus into Sporophila.

The black-billed seed finch has two subspecies, the nominate S. a. atrirostris (Sclater, PL & Salvin, 1878) and S. a. gigantirostris (Bond, J & Meyer de Schauensee, 1939).

== Description ==
The black-billed seed finch is 15 to 16.5 cm (5.9 to 6.5 in) long; two males of subspecies S. a. gigantirostris weighed 23 and 29 g (0.81 and 1.0 oz). It has an "enormous" bill with a very deep base and a gently rounded culmen. The species is sexually dimorphic. Adult males of the nominate subspecies are almost entirely black with white underwing coverts and white bases on the primaries that show as a small patch on the closed wing. Adult females have a warm brown head and upperparts. Their tail and wings are a slightly darker brown with whitish underwing coverts; they lack the male's white primary patch. Their throat and underparts are a slightly paler brown than the upperparts. Both sexes of S. c. occidentalis have the same plumage as the nominate but are larger. Both sexes of both subspecies have a very dark iris, a black bill, and dusky or dark gray legs. Juveniles resemble adult females.

== Distribution and habitat ==
The black-billed seed finch has a disjunct distribution; the subspecies have entirely separate ranges. The nominate subspecies is the more northerly. It is found from extreme southern Colombia south intermittently through eastern Ecuador's lowlands into northern Peru's Huánuco and extreme northwestern Ucayali departments. Subspecies S. c. occidentalis is found from far southeastern Peru's Madre de Dios Department into northern Bolivia to Beni Department with a few records further east.

The black-billed seed finch inhabits "damp grassy areas and clearings as well as shrubby lake margins", the last including oxbow lakes. In elevation it is mostly below 600 m (2,000 ft) in Ecuador and mostly below 1,050 m (3,400 ft) in Peru.

== Behavior ==
=== Movement ===
The black-billed seed finch is a year-round resident.

=== Feeding ===
The black-billed seed finch's diet has not been studied but is assumed to be seeds. It forages singly or in pairs. Nothing else is known about its feeding habits.

=== Breeding ===
Nothing is known about the black-billed seed finch's breeding biology.

=== Vocalization ===
The black-billed seed finch's song is "a variable rich warbling", sometimes with "short buzzy trills between warbled phrases as if 'inhaling'". Its calls are "a gruff, descending djert and a liquid dewp".

== Status ==
The IUCN has assessed the black-billed seed finch as being of Least Concern. It population size is not known but is believed to be stable. No immediate threats have been identified. It is considered rare and local in both Ecuador and Peru.
