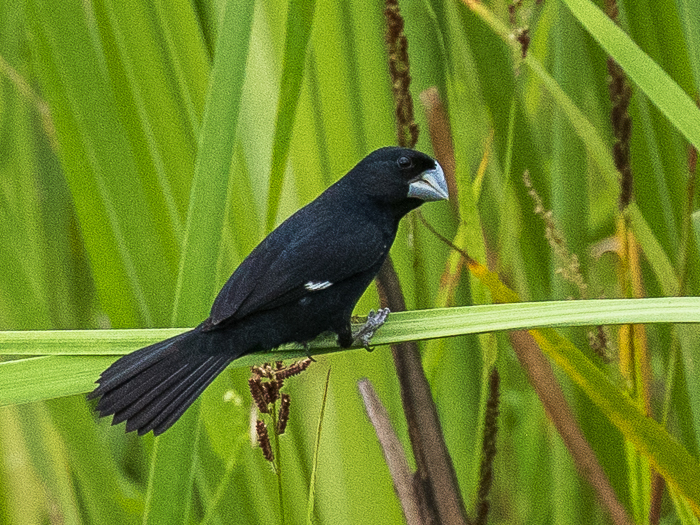
- In Darien, Panama

Conservation status
- Least Concern (IUCN 3.1)

Scientific classification
- Kingdom: Animalia
- Phylum: Chordata
- Class: Aves
- Order: Passeriformes
- Family: Thraupidae
- Genus: Sporophila
- Species: S. crassirostris

Binomial name
- Sporophila crassirostris (Gmelin, 1789)

Synonyms
- See text

= Large-billed seed finch =

Species of bird

The large-billed seed finch (Sporophila crassirostris) is a species of bird in the family Thraupidae, the tanagers and allies. It is found in Bolivia, Brazil, Colombia, Ecuador, French Guiana, Guyana, Peru, Suriname, and Venezuela. It formerly occurred in Trinidad and Tobago but its current status there is uncertain. The species was also confirmed in Panama in 2011.

== Taxonomy and systematics ==
The large-billed seed finch has a complicated taxonomic history. It was formally described in 1789 with the binomial Loxia crassirostris. By 1938 it had been reassigned to genus Oryzoborus, which at the time was a member of the family Fringillidae. By 1970 the genus had been assigned to the family Emberizidae. Based on studies published between 1988 and 2011, beginning in 2012 Oryzoborus was moved to the tanager family Thraupidae. In 2014 taxonomic systems began merging Oryzoborus into Sporophila.

The large-billed seed finch is assigned two subspecies, the nominate S. c. crassirostris (Gmelin, 1789) and S. c. occidentalis (Sclater, PL, 1860). In 1938 the large-billed seed finch had included those two subspecies and two others, and in 1970 had included those four and three more. Eventually two of them were split as the black-billed seed finch (now Sporophila atrirostris with gigantirostris), two others as the great-billed seed finch (S. maximiliani) and the Nicaraguan seed finch (S. nuttingi), and one was subsumed within the great-billed seed finch (S. maximiliani), leaving the two now assigned.

== Description ==
The large-billed seed finch is 13.5 to 14.5 cm (5.3 to 5.7 in) long and weighs about 20 to 28 g (0.71 to 0.99 oz). It has a short bill with a very deep base and a rounded culmen. The species is sexually dimorphic. Adult males of the nominate subspecies S. c. crassirostris are almost entirely black with white underwing coverts and white bases on the primaries that show as a small patch on the closed wing. Adult females have a warm brown head and upperparts. Their tail and wings are a slightly darker brown with white underwing coverts; they lack the male's white primary patch. Their throat and underparts are pale buff-brown. Males of subspecies S. c. occidentalis have a smaller white wing patch and darker underwing coverts but are otherwise like the nominate. Females are like the nominate. Both sexes of both subspecies have a very dark iris. Males have an ivory-white bill and black legs; females have a blackish bill and dark legs. Juveniles resemble adult females.

== Distribution and habitat ==
The nominate subspecies of the large-billed seed finch is the more northerly of the two and has the much larger range. It is found from Santander Department in north-central Colombia south intermittently through eastern Ecuador into northeastern Peru. It also found at sites across northern Colombia. From Colombia and Peru its range continues east very slightly into western Brazil's Amazonas state and into Venezuela. In Venezuela it is found on both sides of the Andes, along the Coastal Range, and inland from the coast across the northern third of the country including far northern Bolívar state. It also is found in far southeastern Bolívar and possibly across the rest of the state and into eastern Amazonas state. From Venezuela its range continues across the Guianas and Brazil's Amapá and far northern Pará states. Several taxonomic lists do not include Panama in the species' range. However, it was documented in the country in 2011 and there are many eBird records since then.

Subspecies S. c. occidentalis is found along Colombia's Western Andes and intermittently through western Ecuador.

The status of the nominate subspecies in Trinidad is uncertain. The Trinidad & Tobago Bird Status & Distribution Committee does not include it in its checklist. The South American Classification Committee includes it as an extirpated species. The account in Birds of the World says, "it appears to have been extirpated on Trinidad, from where there are only undocumented reports in recent years". However, a study of specimens of seed finches taken on Trinidad concluded that those identified as large-billed were actually great-billed seed finches (S. maximiliani, subspecies parkesi).

The large-billed seed-finch inhabits a variety of open landscapes near water. These include grassy and shrubby areas by marshes, rivers, and lakes and also damp pastures and other moist areas with tall grass. In Venezuela it is found below 500 m (1,600 ft) north of the Orinoco River and below 200 m (700 ft) south of it. It reaches 1,400 m (4,600 ft) in Colombia, 700 m (2,300 ft) in Ecuador, and 500 m (1,600 ft) in Brazil.

== Behavior ==
=== Movement ===
The large-billed seed finch is overall a sedentary year-round resident. However, it is thought to make some nomadic movements, at least in Venezuela.

=== Feeding ===
The large-billed seed finch feeds primarily on seeds and is thought to also include small numbers of insects in its diet. It appears to favor seeds of Cyperaceae sedges, perhaps due to its large bill. It plucks seeds while clinging to the plant stalk or an adjacent one and also takes them on the ground. It usually forages singly or in pairs though sometimes in small flocks that can include other seed-eating species.

=== Breeding ===
The reports on the breeding biology of the large-billed seed finch appear to come from Trinidad, where the identity of the species in question is uncertain. Nests were found in May "and possibly September". They were loose cups made from grass lined with finer fibers and some moss on the rim. They were "fairly low" in shrubs. Clutches were of two or three eggs that were cream-colored with dark brown spots. The female alone incubated, for 12 days. The time to fledging is not known but both parents provisioned nestlings.

=== Vocalization ===
The song of the large-billed seed finch's subspecies S. c. occidentalis is "a couple of introductory notes followed by rich gurgling series of rapidly delivered notes" and its call "a sharp chwit! or tchweet!, with explosive quality". That of the nominate is described as a "short, animated series of rather nasal twittering, often introduced by a few fjeu - - notes".

== Status ==
The IUCN has assessed the large-billed seed finch as being of Least Concern. It has a very large range; its estimated population of at least 50,000 mature individuals is believed to be increasing. "The principal threat is the depletion of local populations by bird trappers, although this is not considered a threat in Colombia". It "[a]ppears to be localized and scarce in most of its range" and very rare in the Guianas. It is considered "widespread" in Colombia, "local and scarce" in Ecuador, "apparently rare and local" in Peru, "widespread but very spotty" in Venezuela, and "uncommon to rare" in Brazil.

== Gallery ==
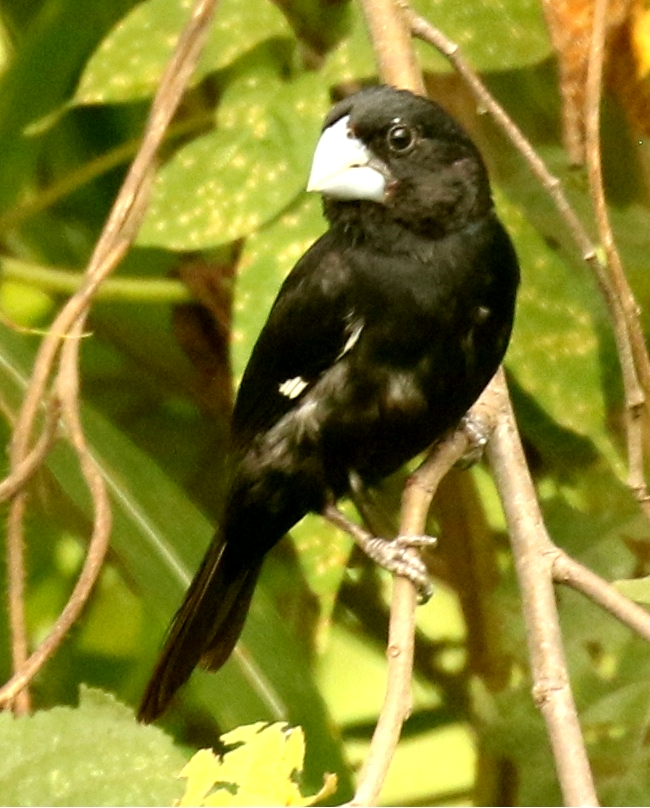
Male, Pan American Highway, Darien, Panama

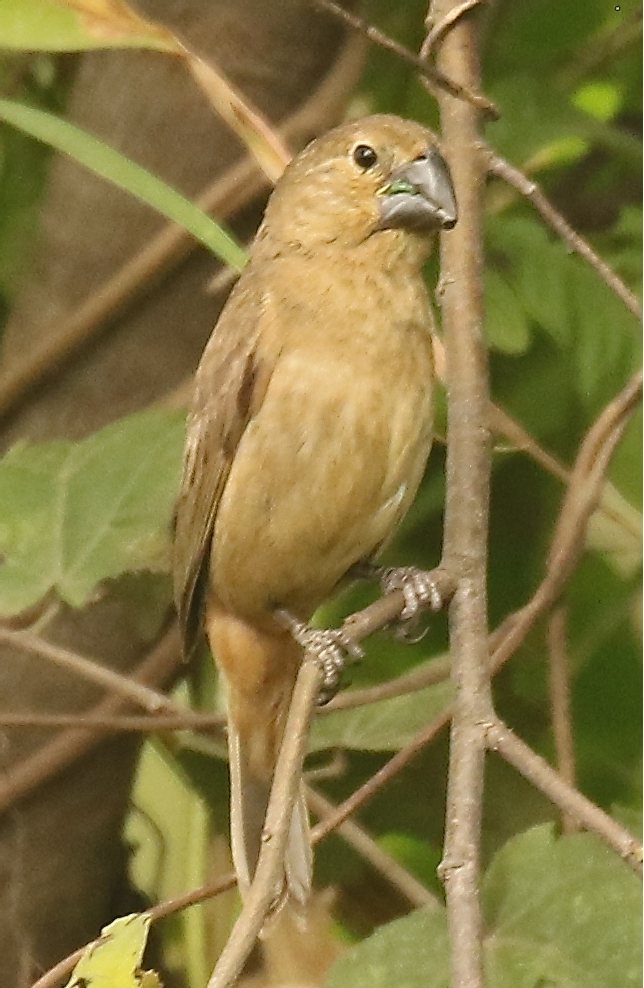
Female, Pan American Highway, Darien, Panama

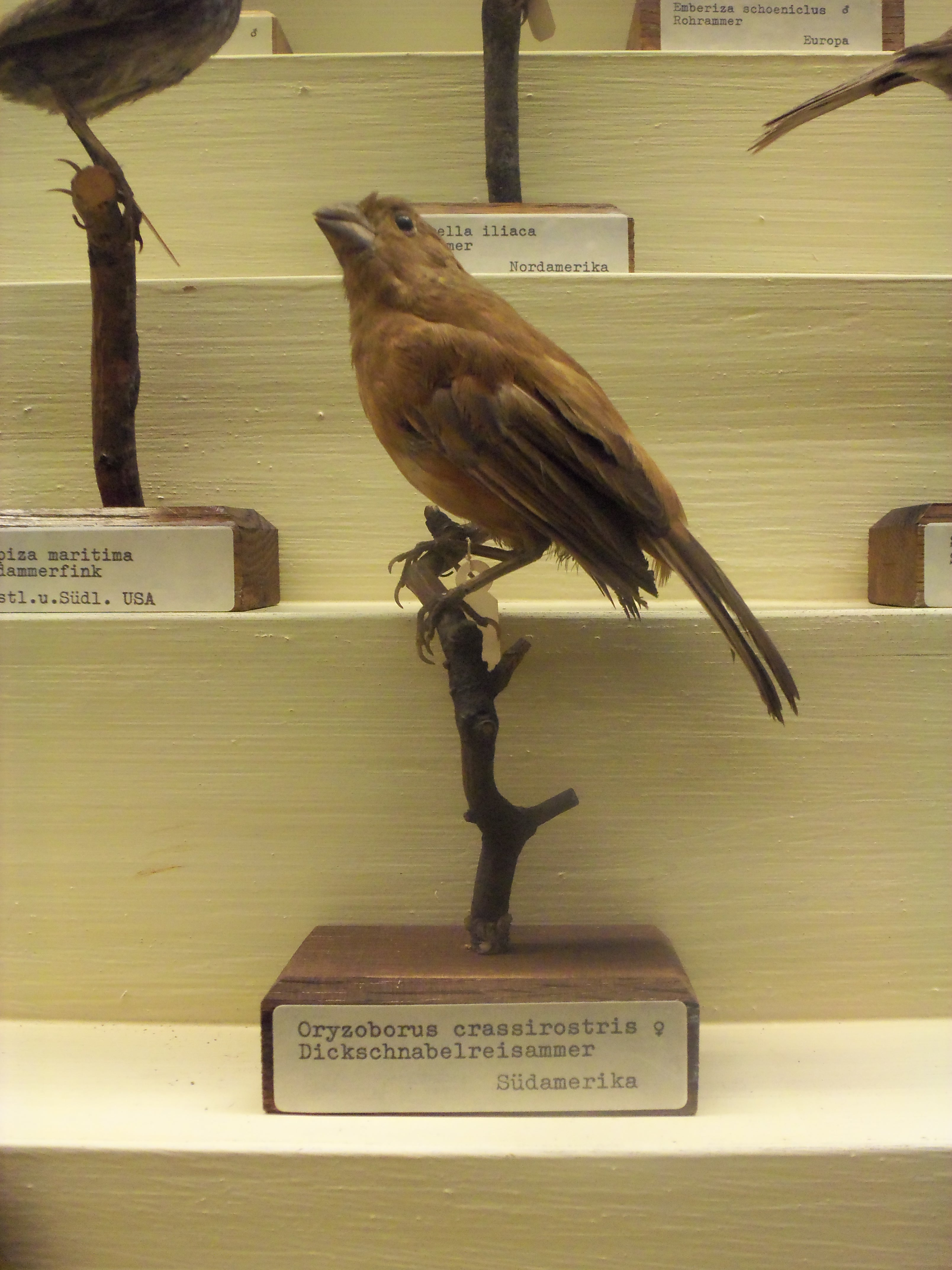
Specimen in Naturhistorisches Museum, Vienna
