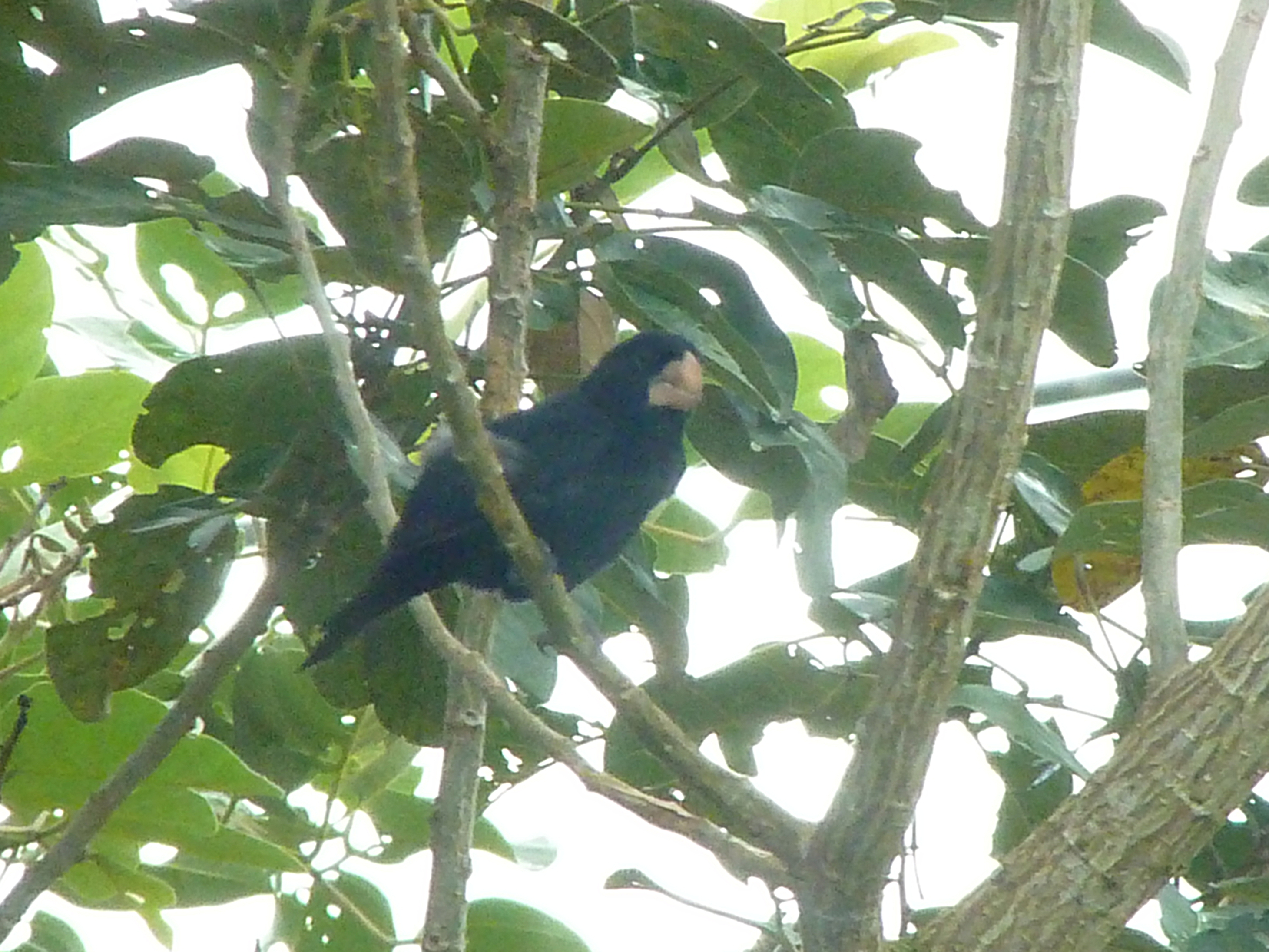

Conservation status
- Least Concern (IUCN 3.1)

Scientific classification
- Kingdom: Animalia
- Phylum: Chordata
- Class: Aves
- Order: Passeriformes
- Family: Thraupidae
- Genus: Sporophila
- Species: S. nuttingi

Binomial name
- Sporophila nuttingi (Ridgway, 1884)

Synonyms
- See text

= Nicaraguan seed finch =

Species of bird

The Nicaraguan seed finch (Sporophila nuttingi) or pink-billed seed finch is a species of bird in the family Thraupidae, the tanagers and allies.. It is found in Costa Rica, Nicaragua and Panama.

== Taxonomy and systematics ==
The Nicaraguan seed finch has a complicated taxonomic history. It was formally described in 1884 with the binomial Oryzoborus nuttingi. At the time Oryzoborus was a member of the family Fringillidae. The specific epithet honors the zoologist Charles Cleveland Nutting. By 1970 the bird had been reassigned as subspecies Oryzoborus crassirostris nuttingi of the large-billed seed finch in the family Emberizidae. By 1998 it had regained its status as a full species. Based on studies published between 1988 and 2011, beginning in 2012 the genus was moved to its present position in the tanager family Thraupidae. In 2014 taxonomic systems began merging Oryzoborus into Sporophila.

The Nicaraguan seed finch is monotypic.

== Description ==
The Nicaraguan seed finch is 14 to 14.5 cm (5.5 to 5.7 in) long and weighs about 24 g (0.85 oz). It has a short bill with a very deep base and a rounded culmen. The species is sexually dimorphic. Adult males are almost entirely black with dusky grayish inner webs on the primaries. Females have a dark brown head and upperparts. Their underparts are usually brown and sometimes deep cinnamon brown. Juveniles resemble adult females. Both sexes have a brown iris and blackish legs. Males have an ivory to pink bill and females a blackish bill with a pinkish ivory base to the mandible.

== Distribution and habitat ==
The Nicaraguan seed finch is found on the Caribbean slope from the western Región Autónoma del Atlántico Norte in northeastern Nicaragua south through Costa Rica to Veraguas Province in western Panama. It was known only in Nicaragua until the 1960s when a range expansion took it into Costa Rica and Panama, apparently as a result of forests being converted to pastures. The species inhabits "marshy, grassy and weedy areas". These include flooded pastures and tall grass on the edges of oxbow lakes, ponds, and small watercourses. In elevation it ranges from sea level to 500 m (1,600 ft).

== Behavior ==
=== Movement ===
The Nicaraguan seed finch is a year-round resident.

=== Feeding ===
The Nicaraguan seed finch's diet has not been studied. It is known to include seeds and probably also includes insects and maybe small fruits. It usually forages singly or in pairs in the breeding season; outside that time it forages in small flocks with other seed-eating species.

=== Breeding ===
The Nicaraguan seed finch breeds between February and July in Costa Rica. Its nest is a cup made from grass and rootlets with a lining of fungal rhizomorphs and plant fibers. It is typically not far above the ground in a shrub or grasses. The clutch is two eggs that are pale greenish white heavy with brown spots. Nothing else is known about the species' breeding biology.

=== Vocalization ===
The Nicaraguan seed finch's song is "a long (ca. 4-10 s) caroling series of notes...mostly slurred whistles, either pure tones or with harmonics...many notes are doubled, some are tripled, and some occur in repeatable sequences". Its call is "a short, sharp chip or check".

== Status ==
The IUCN has assessed the Nicarguan seed finch as being of Least Concern. It has a large range; its estimated population of at least 50,000 mature individuals is believed to be decreasing. No immediate threats have been identified. It is considered "uncommon to rare" overall and "uncommon" in Costa Rica.
