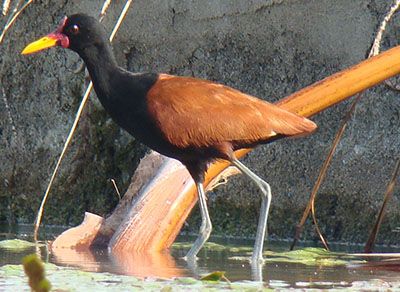
- Wattled jacana (Jacana jacana)

Scientific classification
- Kingdom: Animalia
- Phylum: Chordata
- Class: Aves
- Order: Charadriiformes
- Family: Jacanidae
- Genus: Jacana; Brisson, 1760

Type species
- Parra jacana Linnaeus, 1766

Species
- Jacana jacana; Jacana spinosa

Synonyms
- Parra Linnaeus, 1766

= Jacana (genus) =

Genus of birds

Jacana is the genus comprising the two jacanas of the Americas: the northern jacana (Jacana spinosa), and the wattled jacana (Jacana jacana).

== Taxonomy ==
The genus Jacana was introduced by the French zoologist Mathurin Jacques Brisson in 1760 with the wattled jacana (Jacana jacana) as the type species.

== Description ==
The two species are very similar to each other: about 22 cm (8.7 in) long, with long necks and fairly long yellow bills. Adults are black and chestnut-brown, with pale yellow-green flight feathers that contrast conspicuously when a bird flies. Their legs are long and grayish, and as in all jacanas, their toes are extremely long for walking on aquatic vegetation such as lily pads. They have frontal shields (like those of coots) and wattles; differences in these are the most noticeable differences between the species. Juveniles are brown above and white below, with a buff-white stripe above the eye and a dark stripe behind it. The dark colors are somewhat darker on the juvenile wattled jacana than on the northern. For the etymology and pronunciation of Jacana, see the family article.

== Distribution and habitat ==
Together the species occur in marshes in the American tropics and subtropics. The northern jacana's range meets that of the wattled jacana in western Panama.

== Breeding ==
As in most other jacanas, males build the nests, incubate, and brood the chicks. Both these species are polyandrous, at least in some circumstances. Females lay separate clutches (of four eggs) for up to four mates, each of which tends his clutch alone. Females occasionally practice infanticide.
