= Rex Nutting =

American journalist and economist

Rex Nutting is an American journalist, economist, columnist and the Washington bureau chief for the financial information news site MarketWatch.

== Education ==
In 1984, Nutting graduated from the University of Utah with a bachelor of arts in history. He graduated in 1994 with a master's degree in economics from The American University.

== Career ==
He has worked for UPI Financial, The Salt Lake Tribune, and The Quincy Patriot-Ledger. Since 1997, he has been a columnist for MarketWatch on The Wall Street Journal's Digital Network.

Nutting wrote a May 2012 column, "Obama spending binge never happened," which argued that Obama's administration had been relatively fiscally restrained in its spending policies. In it, Nutting stated, "Of all the falsehoods told about President Barack Obama, the biggest whopper is the one about his reckless spending spree." On May 23, 2012, White House press secretary Jay Carney referenced Nutting's column to argue that President Obama has restrained spending.

On May 24, 2012, President Obama referenced Nutting's column and stated that "Federal spending since I took office has risen at the slowest pace of any president in almost 60 years." The controversy was about how to count the stimulus funding that began under President Bush and continued early in President Obama's first term, and how to deal with the repayment of TARP funds that were repaid later in Obama's administration.
