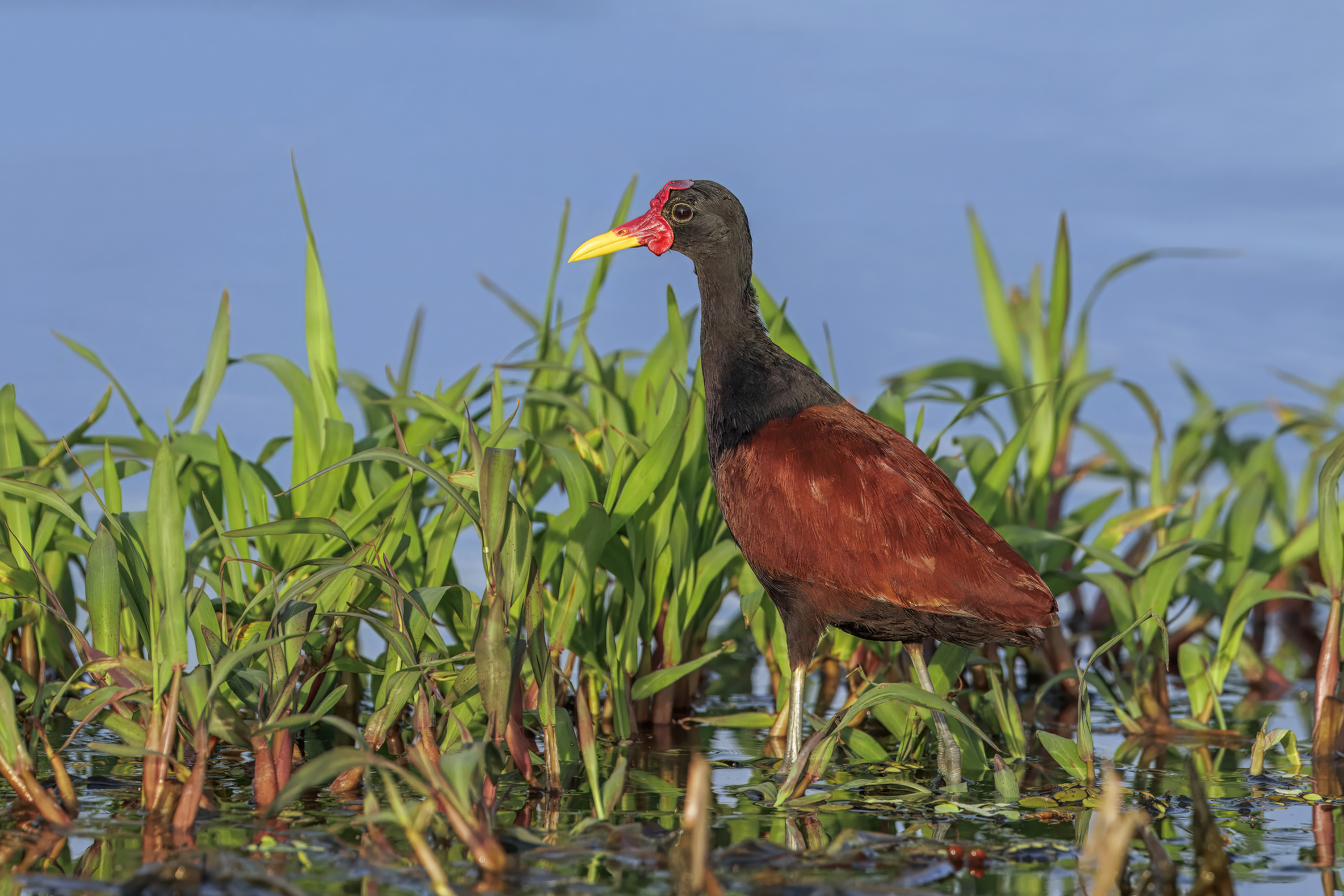
- J. j. intermedia, Eastern Ecuador

Conservation status
- Least Concern (IUCN 3.1)

Scientific classification
- Kingdom: Animalia
- Phylum: Chordata
- Class: Aves
- Order: Charadriiformes
- Family: Jacanidae
- Genus: Jacana
- Species: J. jacana

Binomial name
- Jacana jacana (Linnaeus, 1766)

Synonyms
- Parra jacana Linnaeus, 1766

= Wattled jacana =

Species of bird

The wattled jacana (Jacana jacana) is a wader in the family Jacanidae found throughout much of South America east of the Andes, as well as western Panama and Trinidad. It is the only species in the Jacanidae family with such a large distribution. Wattled jacanas have long toes and claws which help them walk through aquatic vegetation. Like the majority of species of jacanas, the female is larger than the male, and forms harems of up to 4 or 5 males at any given time. There is also a major difference in proportional development or ornamentation (facial crest and wing size) and defense (length of wing spur) relative to body size when compared to males.

== Etymology ==
"Jacana" comes from the Tupi word ñaha'nã which means "very loud bird".

== Breeding ==
The wattled jacana lays four black-marked brown eggs in a floating nest. The male, as with other jacanas and some other wader families like the phalaropes, takes responsibility for incubation, with two eggs held between each wing and the breast. The females are polyandrous and will help to defend the nests of up to four mates.

== Description ==
These are conspicuous and unmistakable birds. They are 17–23 cm (6.7–9.1 in) long, but the females are larger than the males. The adults have a chestnut back and wing coverts, with the rest of the body mainly black. In flight the greenish yellow flight feathers are obvious. Also visible are yellow bony spurs on the leading edge of the wings, which it can use to defend itself and its young. The yellow bill extends up as a red coot-like head shield and a reddish wattle, and the legs and very long toes are dull blue-grey.

Young birds initially have entirely white underparts, and can always be identified by the presence of white in their plumage.

== Taxonomy ==
There are six subspecies, with the nominate J. j. jacana being the most widespread. Several of the other subspecies are similar, but J. j. hypomelaena of western Panama and northern Colombia has all the chestnut plumage replaced by black, and J. j. scapularis of western Ecuador has some black feathers on its chestnut shoulders, and white outer primary feathers.

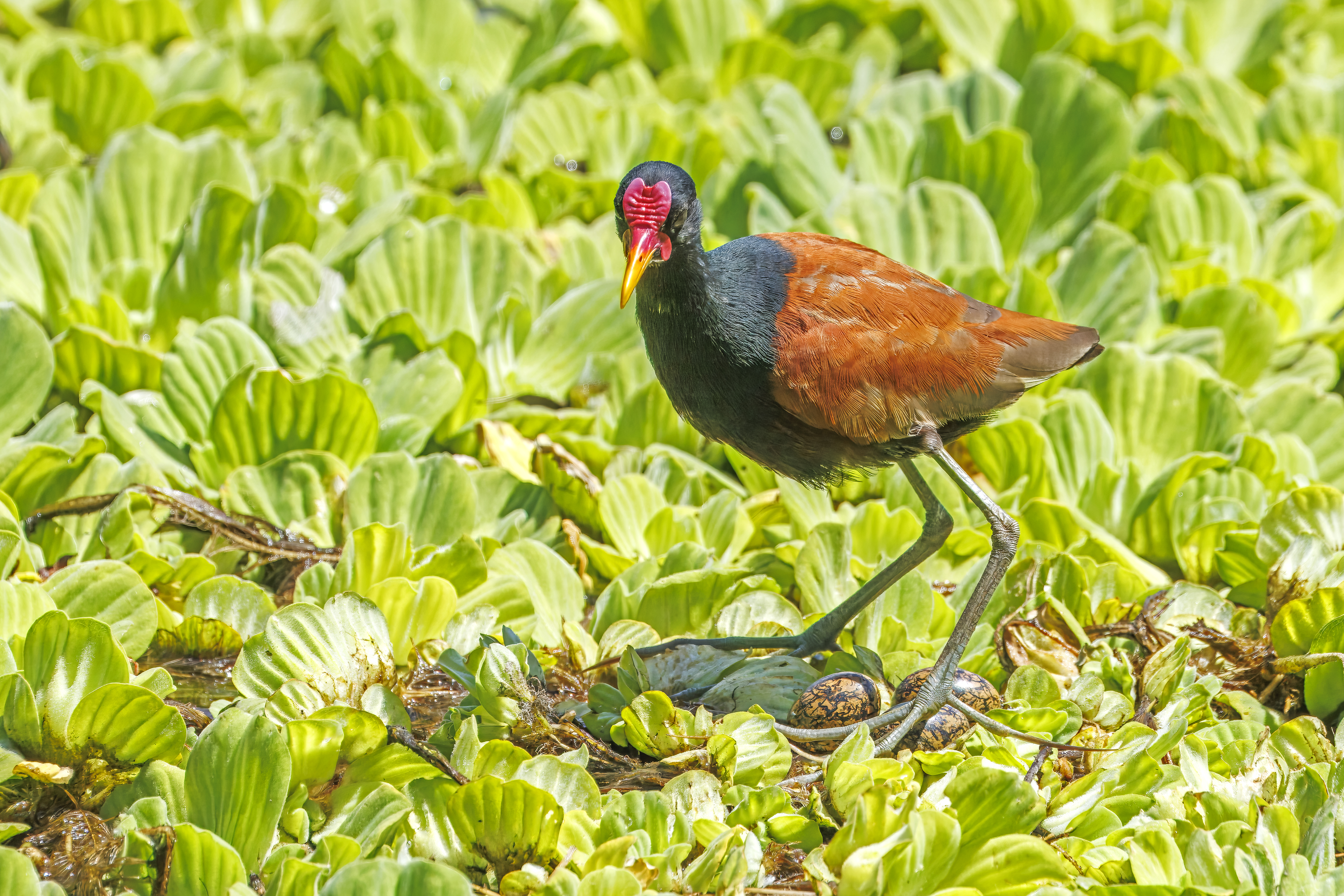
J. j. jacana with eggs
Argentina

Juvenile J. j. jacana
the Pantanal, Brazil

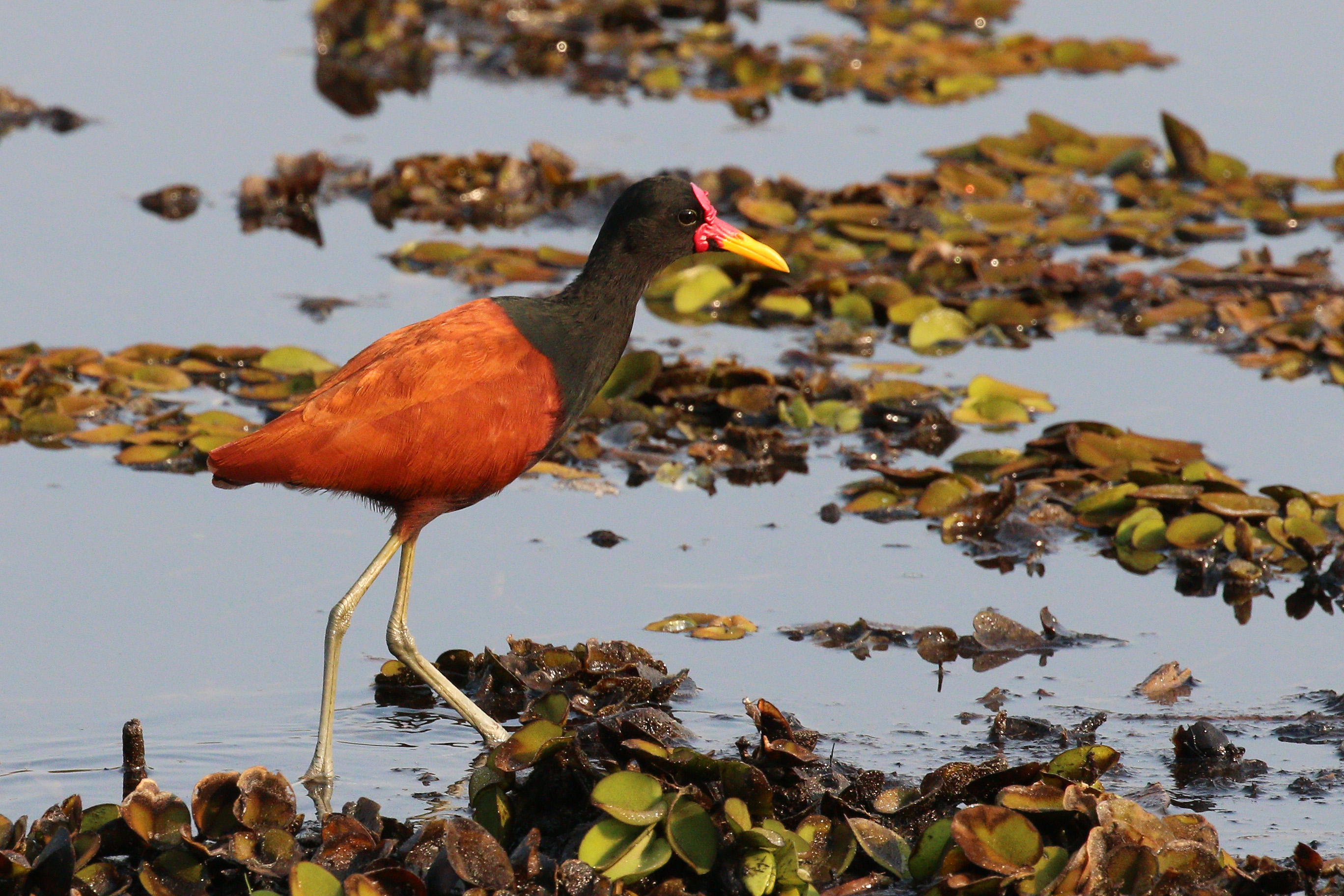
Adult J. j. jacana
Brazil

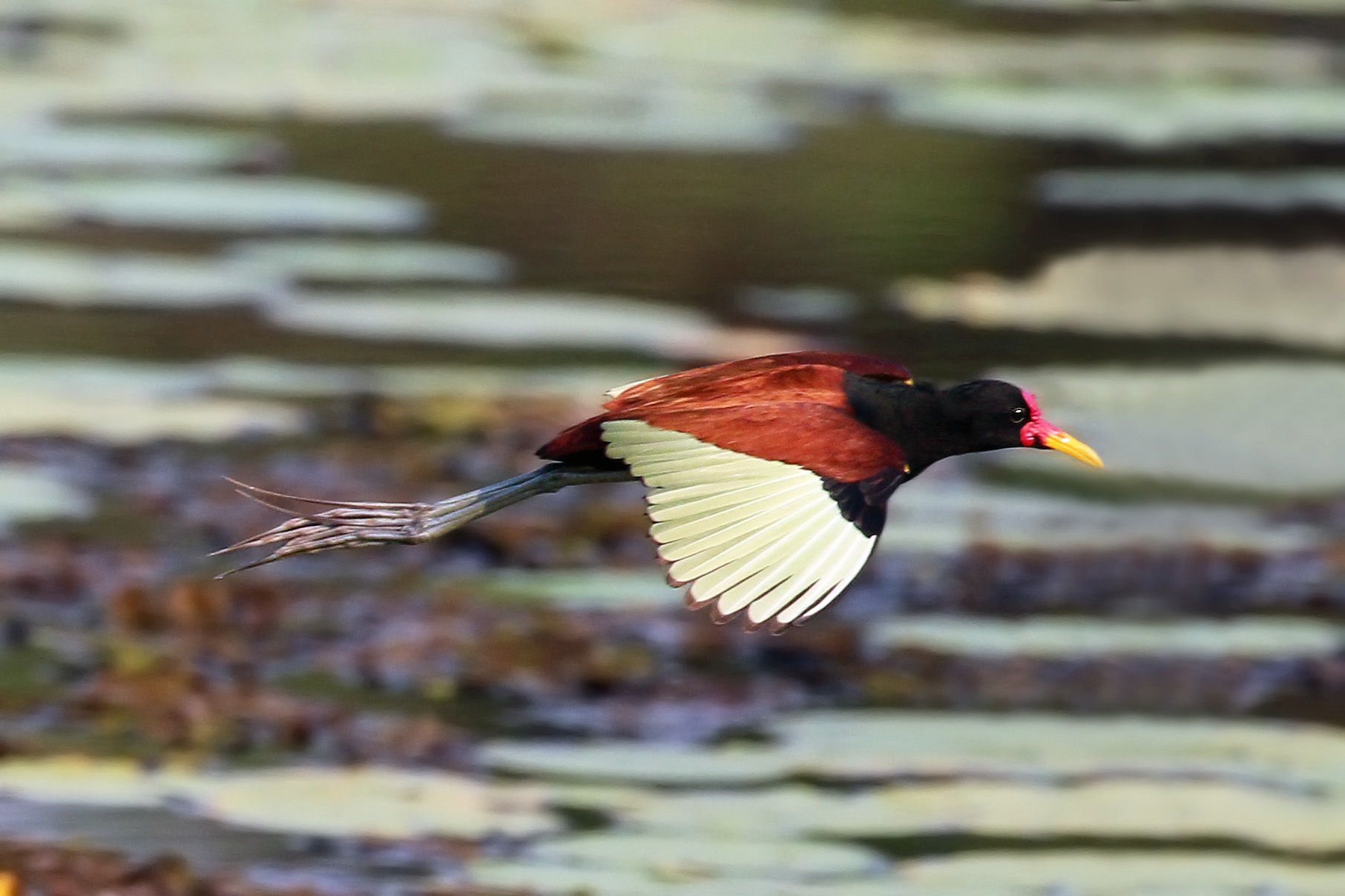
J. j. jacana in flight
Brazil

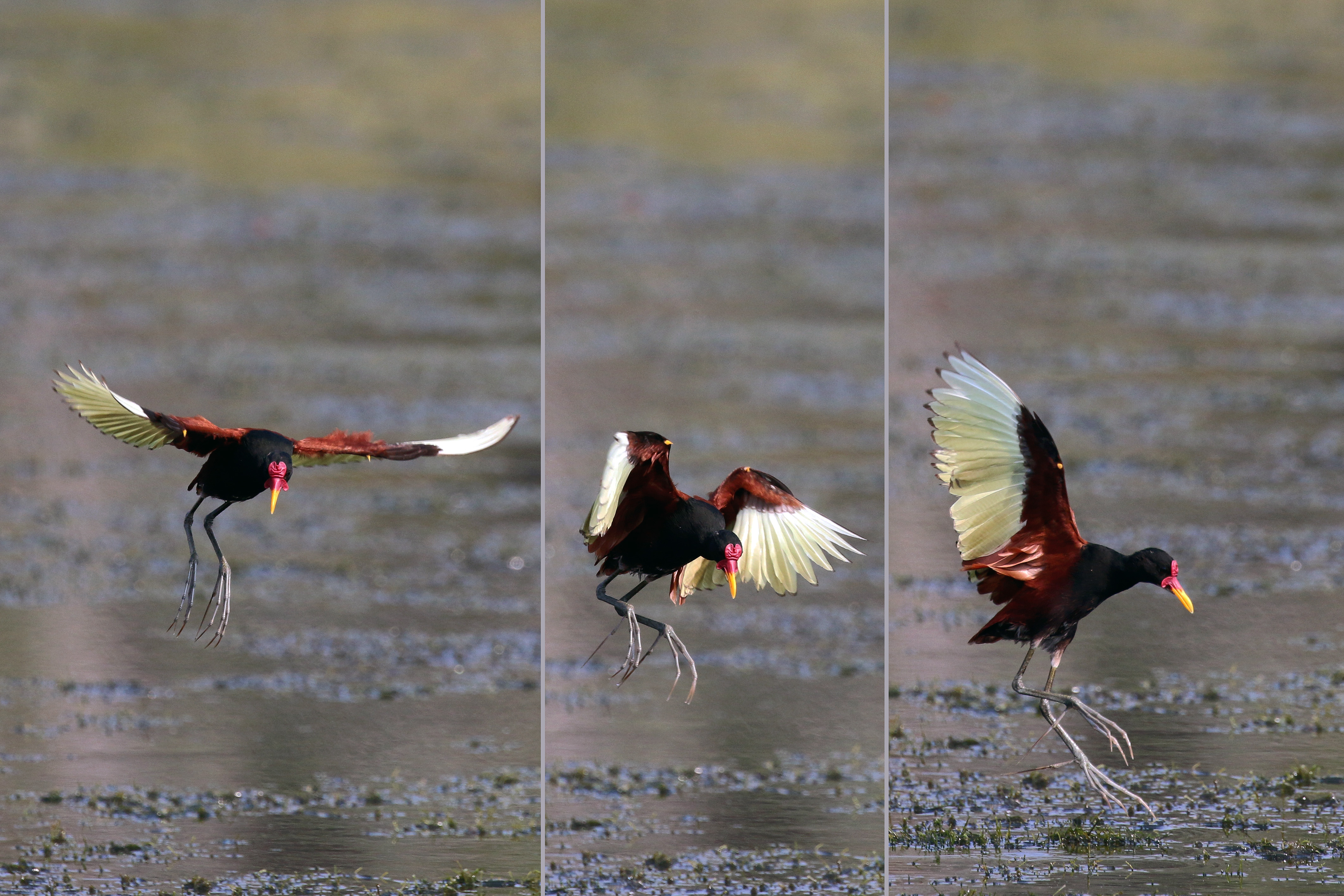
J. j. jacana alighting
Brazil

=== Subspecies ===
- J. j. hypomelaena (Gray, 1846): west-central Panama to northern Colombia
- J. j. melanopygia (Sclater, 1857): western Colombia to western Venezuela
- J. j. intermedia (Sclater, 1857): north & central Venezuela
- J. j. jacana (Linnaeus, 1766): Trinidad, southern Colombia & southern Venezuela through the Guianas south to eastern Bolivia, northern Argentina & Uruguay
- J. j. scapularis (Chapman, 1922): western Ecuador & northwestern Peru
- J. j. peruviana (Zimmer, 1930): northeastern Peru & northwestern Brazil

This species produces a range of noisy rattling calls.

== Diet ==
The wattled jacana's food is insects (such as beetles, grasshoppers and crickets), other invertebrates (e.g. ticks and mollusks), small fish, roots and seeds picked from the floating vegetation or the water's surface.

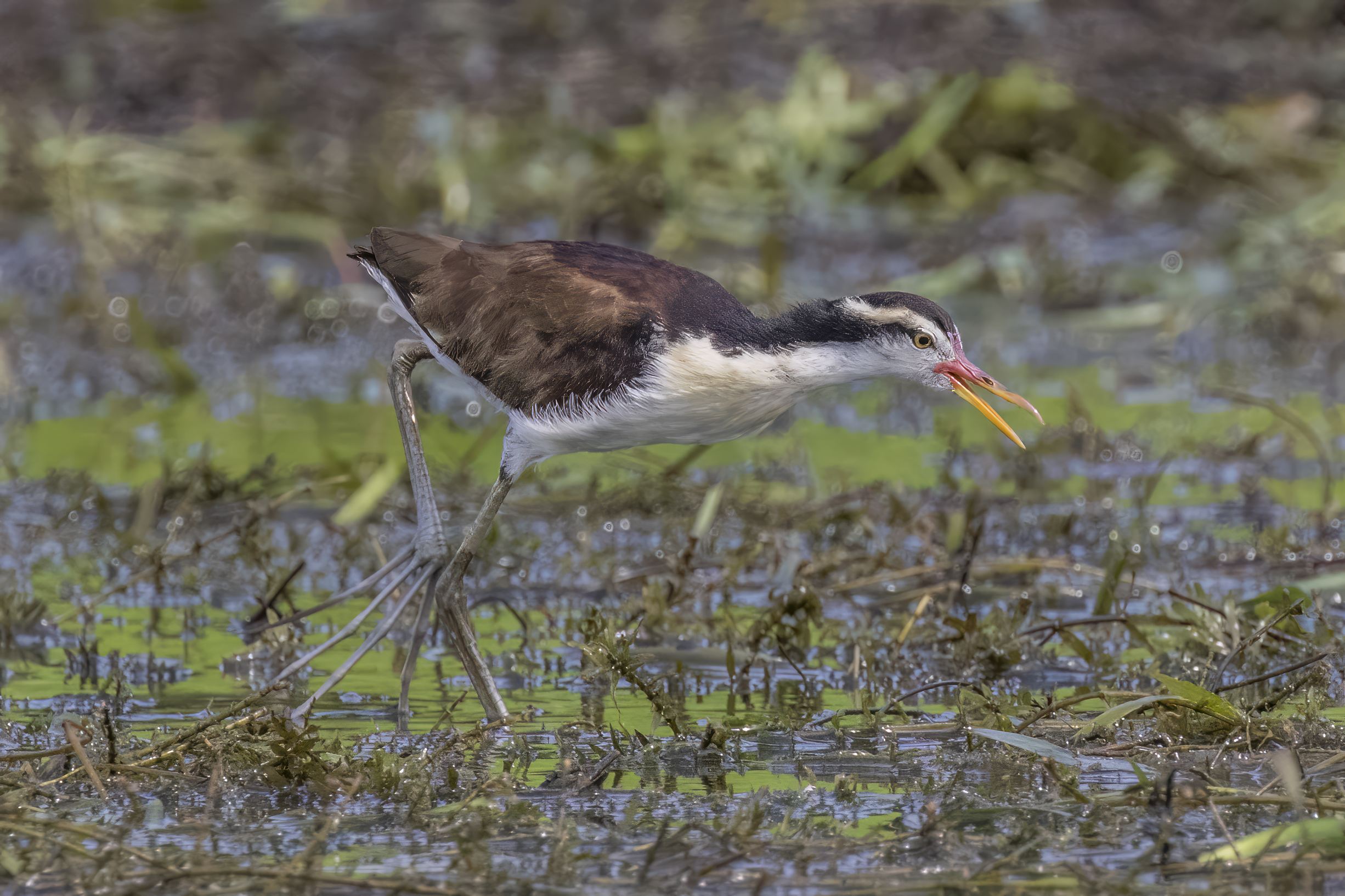
Immature J. j. hypomelaena
Chagres River, Panama

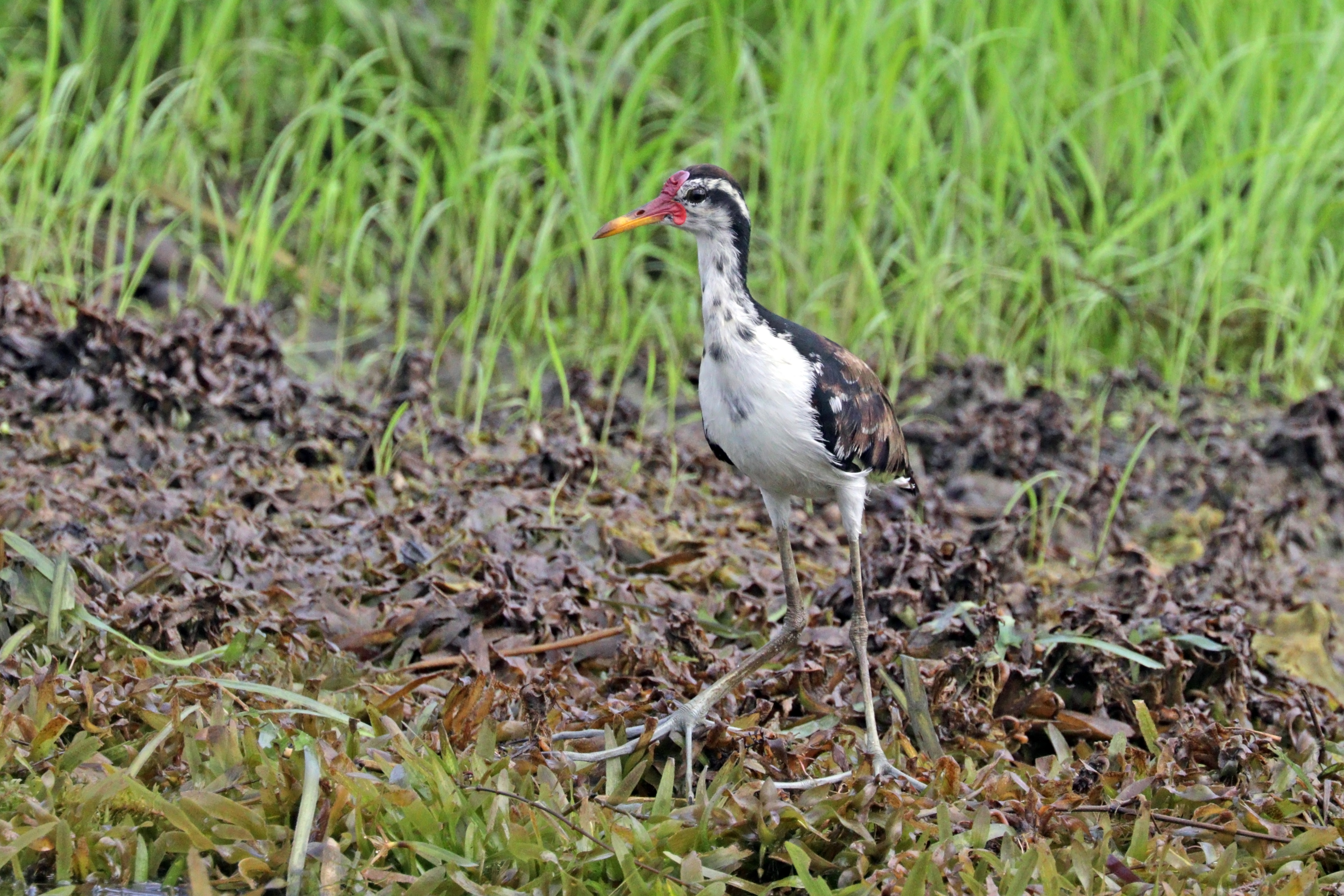
Subadult J. j. hypomelaena
Panama

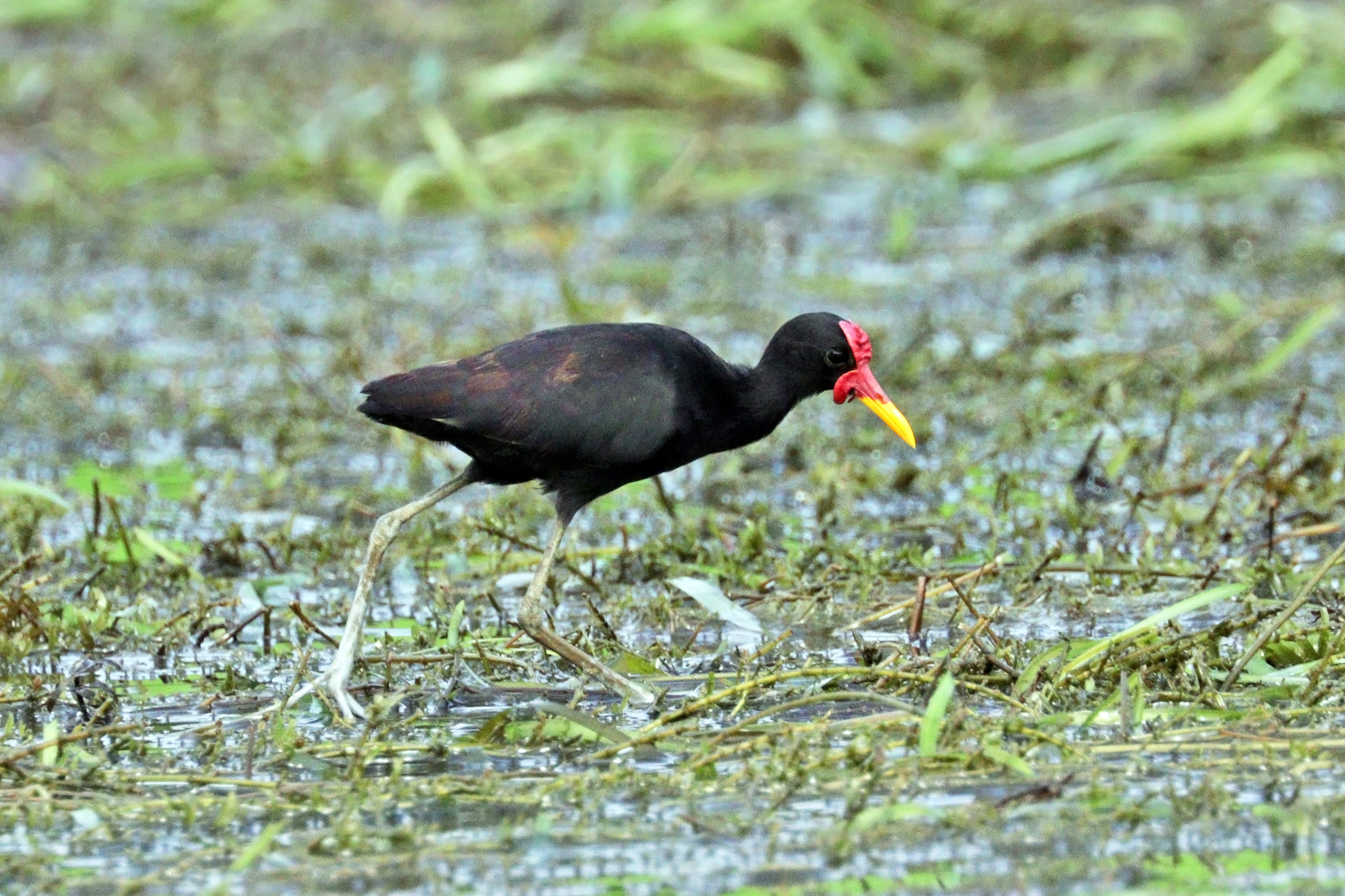
Adult J. j. hypomelaena
Panama
