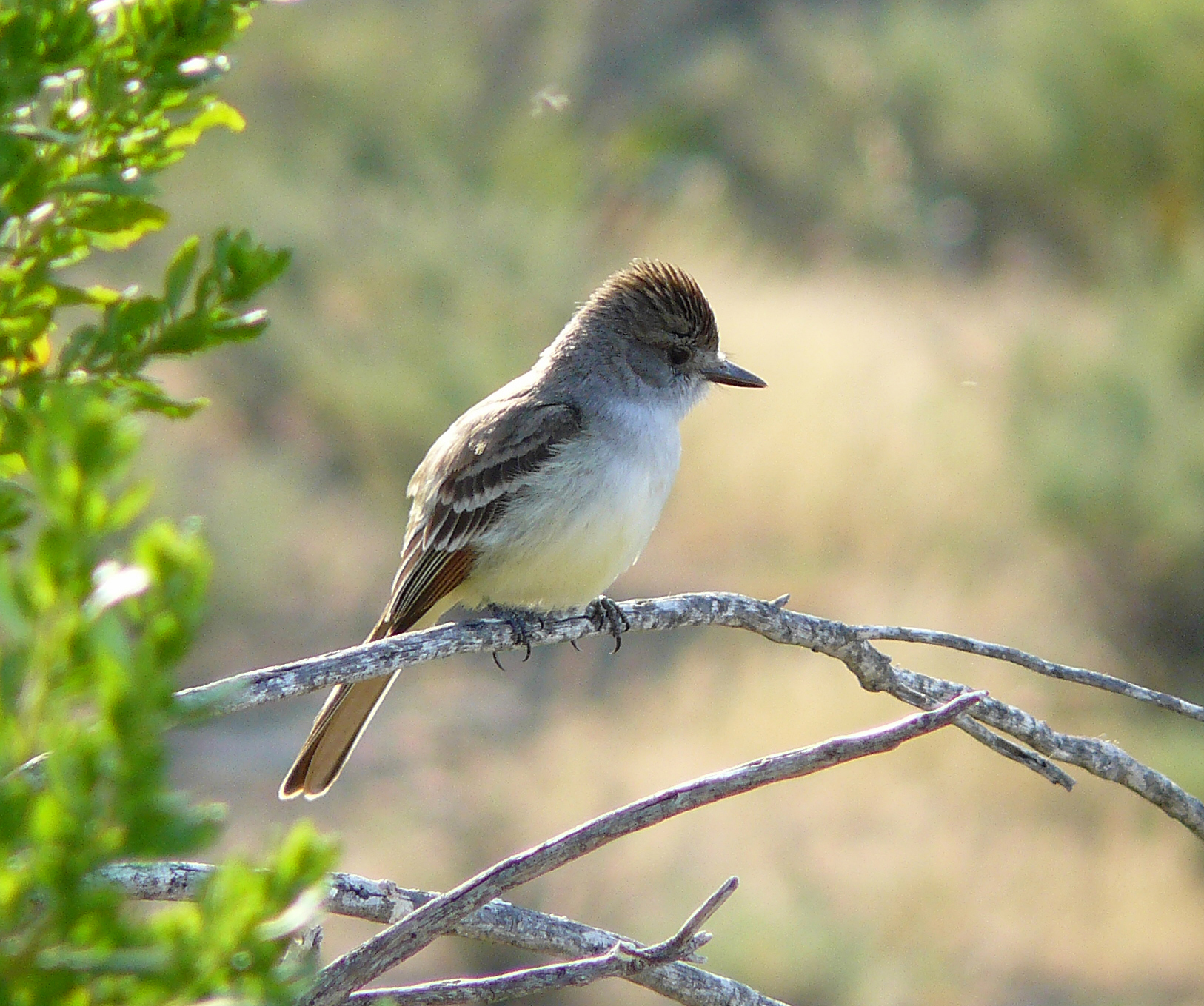
- In California, United States

Conservation status
- Least Concern (IUCN 3.1)

Scientific classification
- Kingdom: Animalia
- Phylum: Chordata
- Class: Aves
- Order: Passeriformes
- Family: Tyrannidae
- Genus: Myiarchus
- Species: M. cinerascens

Binomial name
- Myiarchus cinerascens (Lawrence, 1851)

Synonyms
- Tyrannula cinerascens Tyrannula mexicanus

= Ash-throated flycatcher =

Species of bird

The ash-throated flycatcher (Myiarchus cinerascens) is a passerine bird in the tyrant flycatcher family.

== Taxonomy ==
First described in 1851 by George Newbold Lawrence from a specimen collected in western Texas in the United States, the ash-throated flycatcher was initially given the scientific name Tyrannula cinerascens. The species was mistakenly described again in 1851 as Tyrannula mexicanus — an error that was corrected in 1859 when Philip Lutley Sclater analyzed the tyrant flycatchers known from Mexico and realized that both scientific names referred to the same species. During the same analysis, Slater moved the ash-throated flycatcher from the genus Tyrannula to its current genus, Myiarchus. In the past, the ash-throated flycatcher has sometimes been considered to be conspecific with Nutting's flycatcher, but there are morphological and vocal differences between the two. There is disagreement as to whether the two species hybridize.

The ash-throated flycatcher has two recognized subspecies:

- M. c. cinerascens, the nominate subspecies described by Lawrence in 1851, breeds from the western US down into southern and central Mexico and winters from the southern US to Honduras, principally on the Pacific slope.
- M. c. pertinax, described by Spencer Fullerton Baird in 1860, is restricted to Mexico's Baja California.

The genus name Myiarchus is a compound word created from the Greek words muia (μυια), meaning "fly" and arkos (αρχος) meaning "ruler" or "chief". The species epithet cinerascens is a Latin word meaning "ashen".

== Description ==
The ash-throated flycatcher is a medium-sized tyrant flycatcher, measuring 7.5 to 8.6 in (19 to 22 cm) in length with a wingspan of 11.8 to 12.6 in (30 to 32 cm) and a mass of 0.7 to 1.3 oz (20 to 37 g). Overall, it is slim and long-tailed, with a slightly peaked crest on its relatively large head. The upperparts are olive brown, with a darker head and short crest. The breast is gray and the belly is a very pale yellow. The brown tail feathers and wings have rufous outer webs, and there are two dull wing bars. The sexes are similar.

== Distribution and habitat ==
It breeds in desert scrub, riparian forest, brushy pastures and open woodland from the western United States to central Mexico. It is a short-distance migrant, retreating from most of the U.S. and northern and central Mexico, spending the winter from southern Mexico to Honduras. This bird is also prone to wander, with single birds often seen outside its normal breeding range as far away as the east coast of North America.

== Behavior ==
=== Feeding ===
This species is primarily an insectivore that flies from a perch to catch prey from the ground or from foliage in the undergrowth, less often from branches and trunks, hardly ever in midair. Unlike many other tyrant flycatchers, it often moves on to another perch rather than returning to the same one. It also takes some fruit, especially in winter if insects are unavailable. Rarely, it takes small mammals and reptiles, which it kills by banging them against hard objects.

=== Breeding ===
The nest is built in a tree cavity or similar natural or man-made hole, and the normal clutch is three or four eggs.

=== Vocalizations ===
The ash-throated flycatcher is separated from other confusingly similar Myiarchus species by its calls, a burry kabrick and a rough prrt or wheer heard year-round.

== Conservation and threats ==
Because of its extensive range, very large population, and generally increasing numbers, the ash-throated flycatcher has been listed as a species of least concern by the International Union for Conservation of Nature. It is one of the species protected by the Migratory Bird Treaty Act. In the United States, the creation of bluebird trails, a network of nest boxes put out for the continent's three bluebird species, may benefit ash-throated flycatchers as they will also use the boxes.

Ash-throated flycatchers have been found to be negatively affected by noise pollution. Noise pollution is an unnaturally high and harmful level of noise within an environment, and can be caused by industrial changes like automobiles, airplanes or factories. In one study, noise pollution caused decreases in baseline corticosterone and increases in acute (stressor-induced) corticosterone levels in both adult female and nestling ash-throated flycatchers. At the highest levels of environmental noise, nestling flycatchers also showed decreased feather growth and body mass. Abnormal noise levels may also decrease the ash-throated flycatcher's listening area within its territory, affecting its ability to find prey or avoid predators.

=== Parasites and predators ===
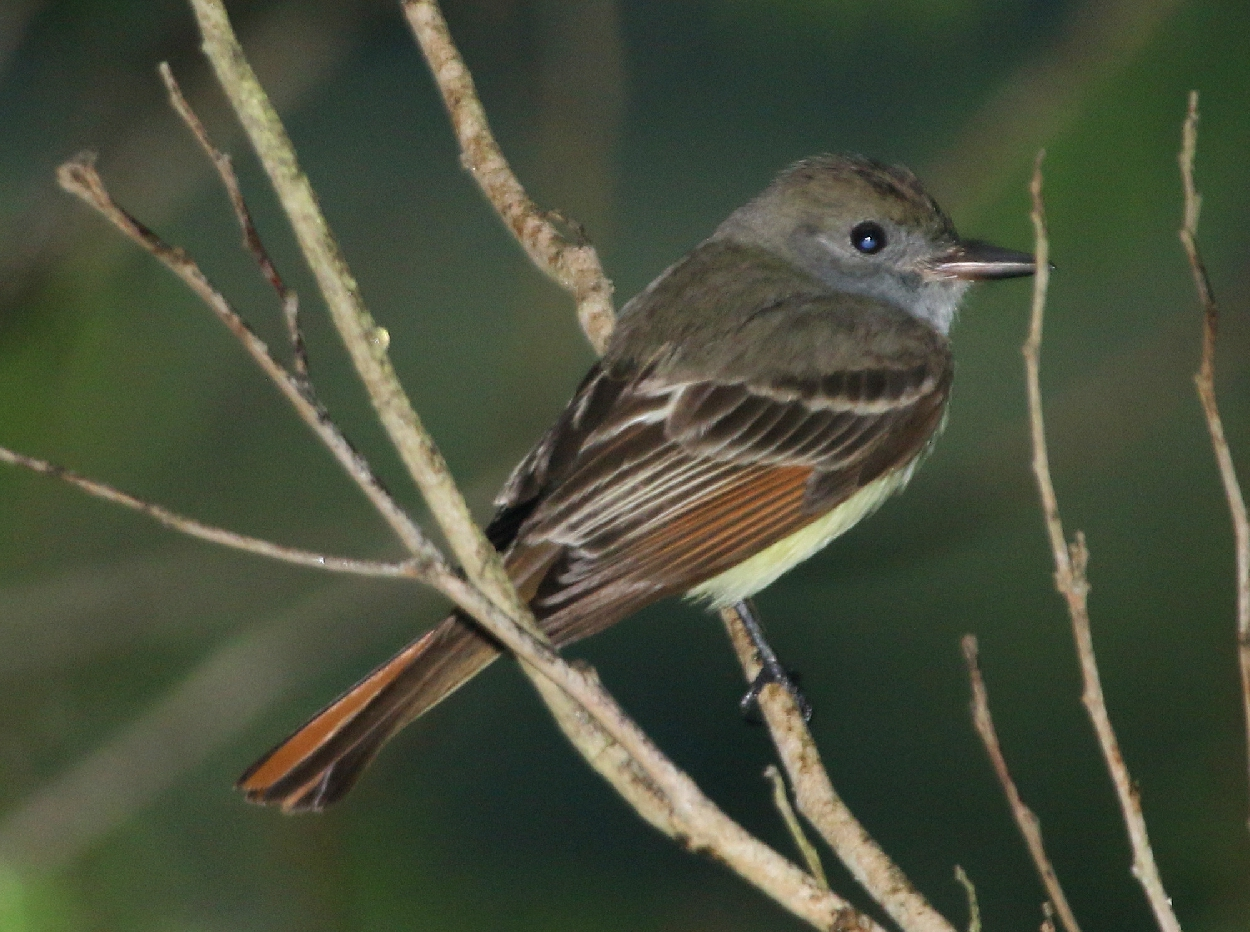
South Padre Island - Texas (flash photo)

The ash-throated flycatcher is host to a number of parasites, including the nasal mite Tyranninyssus callinectoides (for which it is the type host) and the quill mite Syringophilopsis tyranni.
