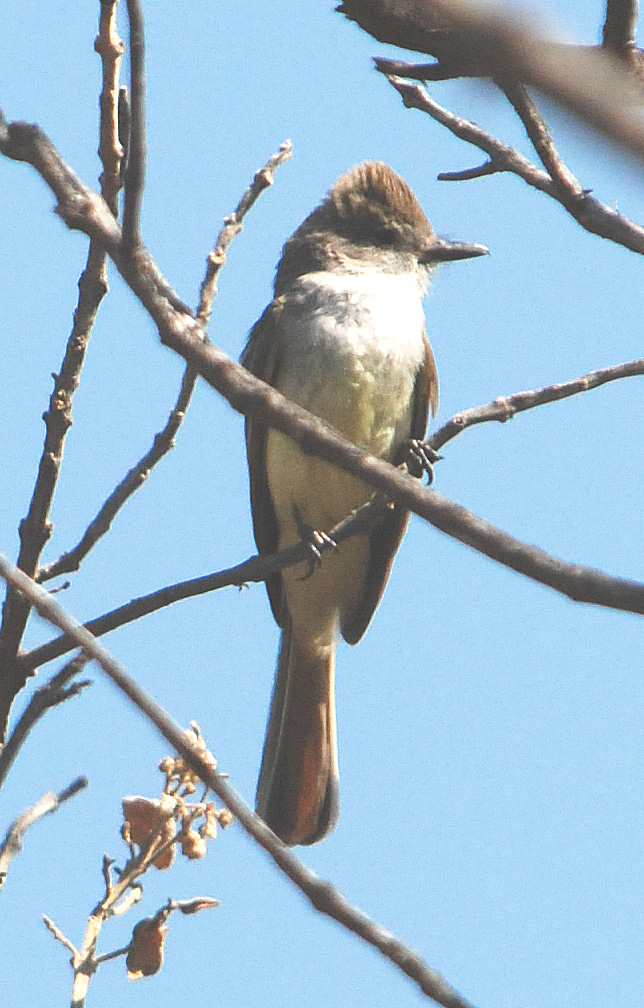

Conservation status
- Least Concern (IUCN 3.1)

Scientific classification
- Kingdom: Animalia
- Phylum: Chordata
- Class: Aves
- Order: Passeriformes
- Family: Tyrannidae
- Genus: Myiarchus
- Species: M. nuttingi

Binomial name
- Myiarchus nuttingi Ridgway, 1882

= Nutting's flycatcher =

Species of bird

Nutting's flycatcher (Myiarchus nuttingi) is a passerine bird in the family Tyrannidae, the tyrant flycatchers. It is found from Mexico to Costa Rica.

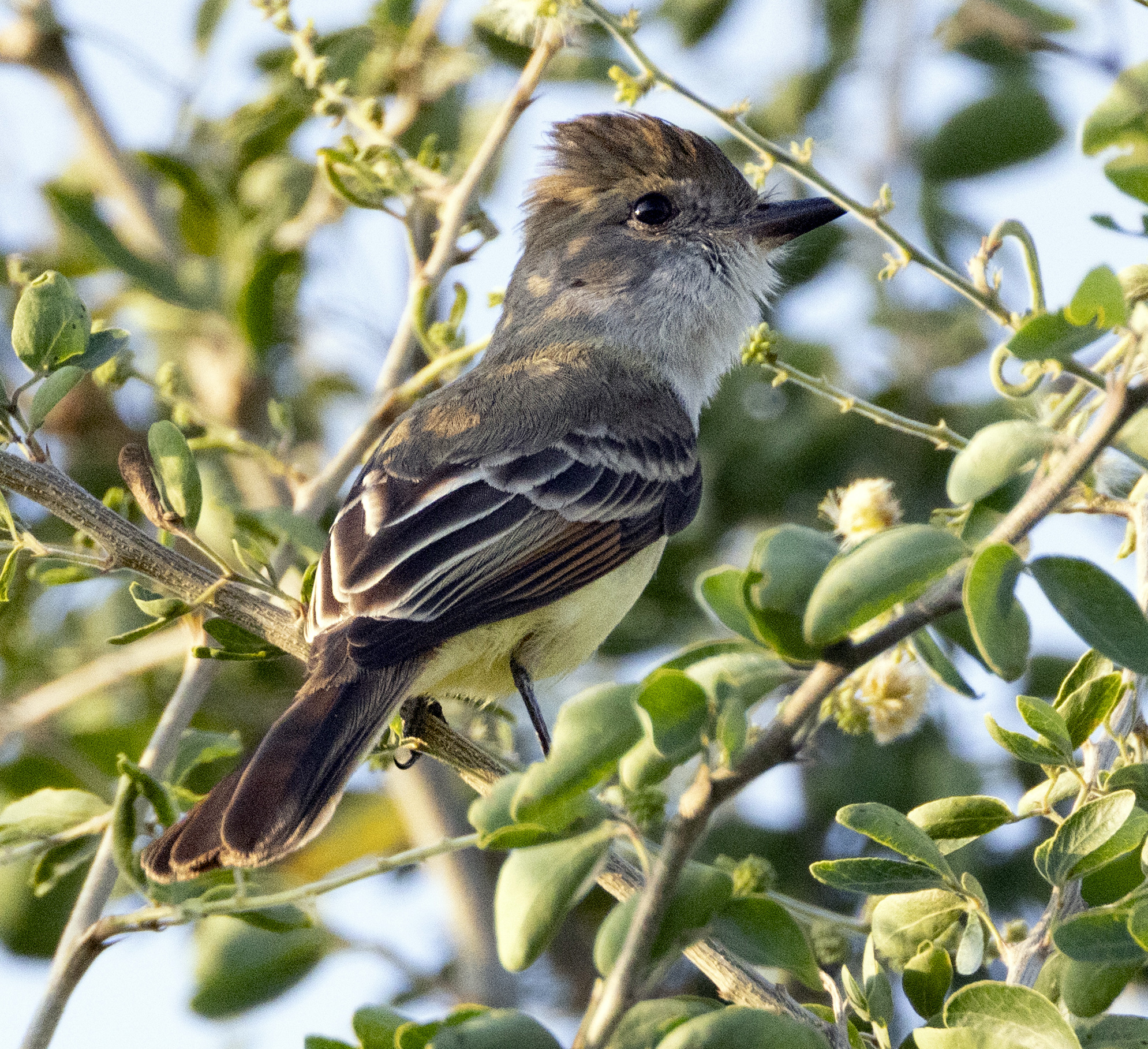
El Tuito, Jalisco, Mexico

== Taxonomy and systematics ==
Nutting's flycatcher has three subspecies, the nominate M. n. nuttingi (Ridgway, 1882), M. n. inquietus (Salvin & Godman, 1889), and M. n. flavidior (van Rossem, 1936). Some authors have suggested that M. n. flavidior deserves species status due to some differences in vocalizations and plumage, but the American Ornithological Society did not accept a proposal to separate it. The Clements taxonomy does recognize it as "Nutting's flycatcher (Salvadoran)" within the species. "All three taxa have been thought to occur in both pure and hybrid forms in Oaxaca; [the] complex pattern of zones of contact between races has not been assessed since 1961, and study [is] urgently needed."

Some authors have treated Nutting's flycatcher and the ash-throated flycatcher (M. cinerascens) as conspecific.

The species' English name and specific epithet honor Charles Cleveland Nutting (1858–1927).

== Description ==
Nutting's flycatcher is 18 to 19 cm (7.1 to 7.5 in) long and weighs about 21 to 24 g (0.74 to 0.85 oz). The sexes have the same plumage. Adults of the nominate subspecies have a drab gray-brown crown that has a slight crest. Their face is otherwise a paler gray. Their upperparts are mostly drab gray-brown with a rufescent tinge on the uppertail coverts. Their wings are browner than the upperparts with rufous outer edges on the primaries and grayish white outer edges on the secondaries and tertials. The wing's greater and median coverts have pale tips that show as two wing bars. Their tail is mostly drab gray-brown with thin rufous edges on all but the outermost feathers. Their throat and breast are gray and their belly and undertail coverts yellow. Subspecies M. n. inquietus is larger than the other two but otherwise like the nominate. M. n. flavidor has a richer yellow belly than the other two. All subspecies have a dark iris, a dark bill, and dark legs and feet. Juveniles have much rufous on the tips of the wing coverts and central tail feathers.

== Distribution and habitat ==
Subspecies M. n. inquietus is the northernmost of the three. It is found in western and central Mexico from Sonora south to Chiapas and east in San Luis Potosí and Hidlago. The nominate subspecies is found in the Mexican interior in Oaxaca and Chiapas and from there south on the interior Pacific slope through Guatemala, El Salvador, Honduras, and Nicaragua into northwestern Costa Rica's Guanacaste Province. M. n. flavidor is found more coastally on the Pacific slope from Oaxaca and Chiapas south to western Nicaragua.

Nutting's flycatcher inhabits forest and scrublands in the tropical and lower subtropical zones. These include tropical deciduous forest, gallery forest, and virgin and second-growth arid scrub. In northern Central America it also is found in thorn forest and in Costa Rica in more humid forest than further north. In elevation overall it ranges from sea level to 1,800 m (5,900 ft) though only to 1,200 m (3,900 ft) in Costa Rica.

== Behavior ==
=== Movement ===
Nutting's flycatcher is a year-round resident throughout its range. It does wander northward and has nested in Arizona. It has also been documented as a vagrant in California and Texas.

=== Feeding ===
Nutting's flycatcher feeds on insects and berries. It usually forages from the forest understory to its mid-story, and usually with the foliage. It takes most prey and berries by snatching them while briefly hovering after a sally from a perch. Less often it captures insects in mid-air. It has been observed following army ant swarms.

=== Breeding ===
Nutting's flycatcher builds a nest of fur, feathers, plant material, and snake skin. It places it in a cavity in a tree or fence post, usually within about 1.2 m (4 ft) of the ground. Its clutch is three to five eggs. Its breeding season, incubation period, time to fledging, and details of parental care are not known.

=== Vocalization ===
The primary call of Nutting's flycatcher is "a low whistle that rises initially and then descends, wEEeeeuuu". Other calls include a "shorter wEEeuup...a whistled whinny...agitated nasal calls, pee'up! or wi'wi'uh!, and a scratchy rrheeaa".

== Status ==
The IUCN has assessed Nutting's flycatcher as being of Least Concern. It has a very large range; its estimated population of at least 500,000 mature individuals is believed to be decreasing. No immediate threats have been identified. It is considered uncommon to fairly common in northern Central America and uncommon in Costa Rica.
