= Charles Cleveland Nutting =

American zoologist (1858–1927)

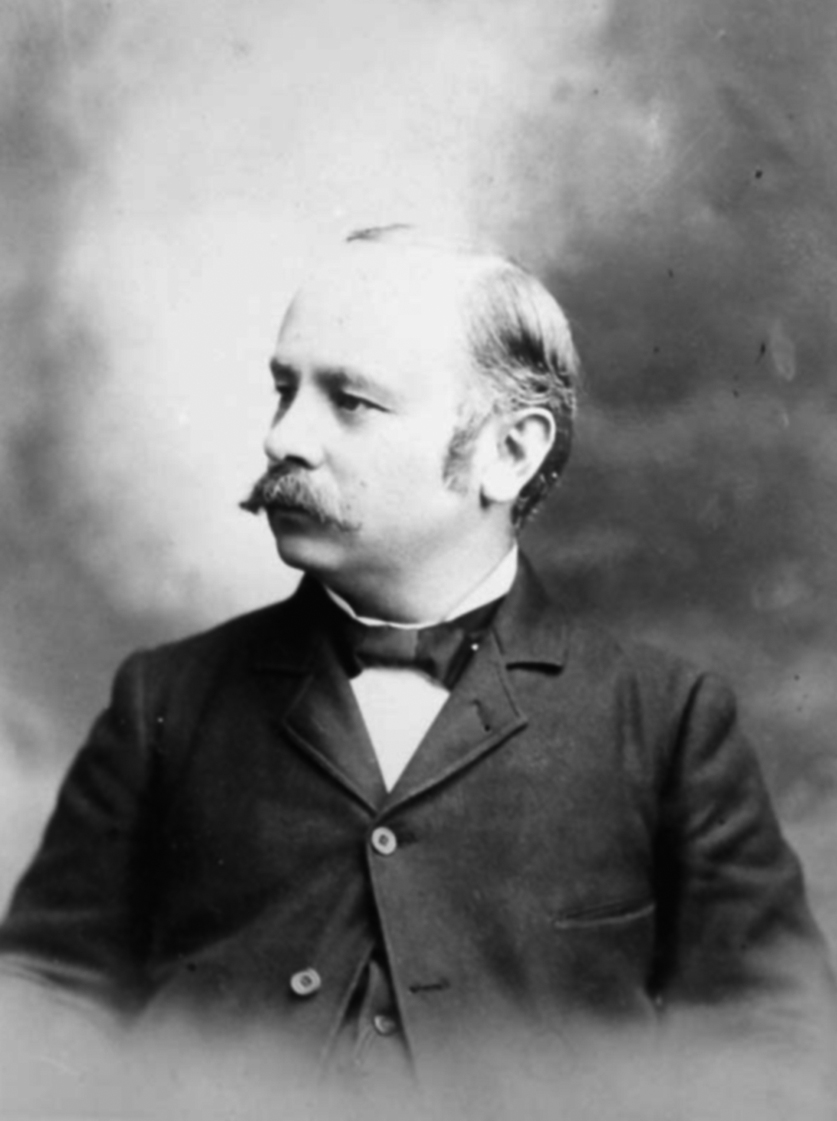
- Nutting, c. 1897
- Born: May 25, 1858; Jacksonville, Illinois, US
- Died: January 23, 1927 (aged 68); Iowa City, Iowa, US
- Other names: C. C, Nutting
- Education: Blackburn University (BA, MA) University of Iowa (PHD)
- Spouses: Elizabeth B. Hersman (m. 1886-1891; Mary Eloise Willis
- Scientific career
- Workplaces: Smithsonian Institution University of Iowa
- Notable students: Rudolph Martin Anderson William Larrabee Jr.

Charles Cleveland Nutting (May 25, 1858 – January 23, 1927) was an American zoologist, professor, and museum curator born in Jacksonville, Illinois. Nutting graduated from Blackburn College in 1880 and received the M. A. degree from the same institution in 1882. Nutting did notable work for the Smithsonian Institution and the University of Iowa, collecting hundreds of specimens on his expeditions around the world. His expeditions included trips to the Bahamas, Hawaii, Costa Rica, Alaska, Barbados, and Antigua.

Nutting founded 2 families, 7 genera and discovered 175 new species of hydrozoa, along with 206 new species of Alcyonaria. He has one genus, nuttingi, named after hims, as well as over thirty different species including Nutting's flycatcher (Myiarchus nuttingi), Nicaraguan seed finch (Oryzoborus nuttingi), Nutting's hatchet fish (Polyipnus nuttingi), and Nutting's murex (Paziella nuttingi).

== Biography ==
=== Early life ===
Charles Cleveland Nutting was born in Jacksonville, Illinois, to parents Rufus Nutting Jr. and Margaretta Leib (née Hunt). Nutting was the fourth of seven children, including four boys and three girls. However, his brother immediately younger brother, Edwin, would die in early infancy. His father was a Presbyterian minister and a professor of Greek at the Blackburn College in Carlinville, Illinois, where he was made Doctor of Divinity. His mother was the cousin of Brigadier General Henry Jackson Hunt, who fought in the Mexican–American War and American Civil War.

After his early schooling years in Jacksonville, Nutting would attend Shortridge High School in Indianapolis, Indiana, where he was taught by David Starr Jordan, who would introduce him to darwinism. Upon graduating from high school, he would attend the same college is father taught, Blackburn College. He entered college in 1876 and would earn his Bachelor of Arts in 1880. During his undergraduate studies, Nutting would meet his late wife Elizabeth Hersman. They married on August 10, 1886, but she would pass away while giving birth to their daughter Caroline in 1891. After graduation, he took a job as a paymaster in Colorado where his brother Will lived and also worked as a surveyor for the Denver and Rio Grande Western Railroad. He would eventually return to Blackburn college and receive his Master of Arts in 1882.

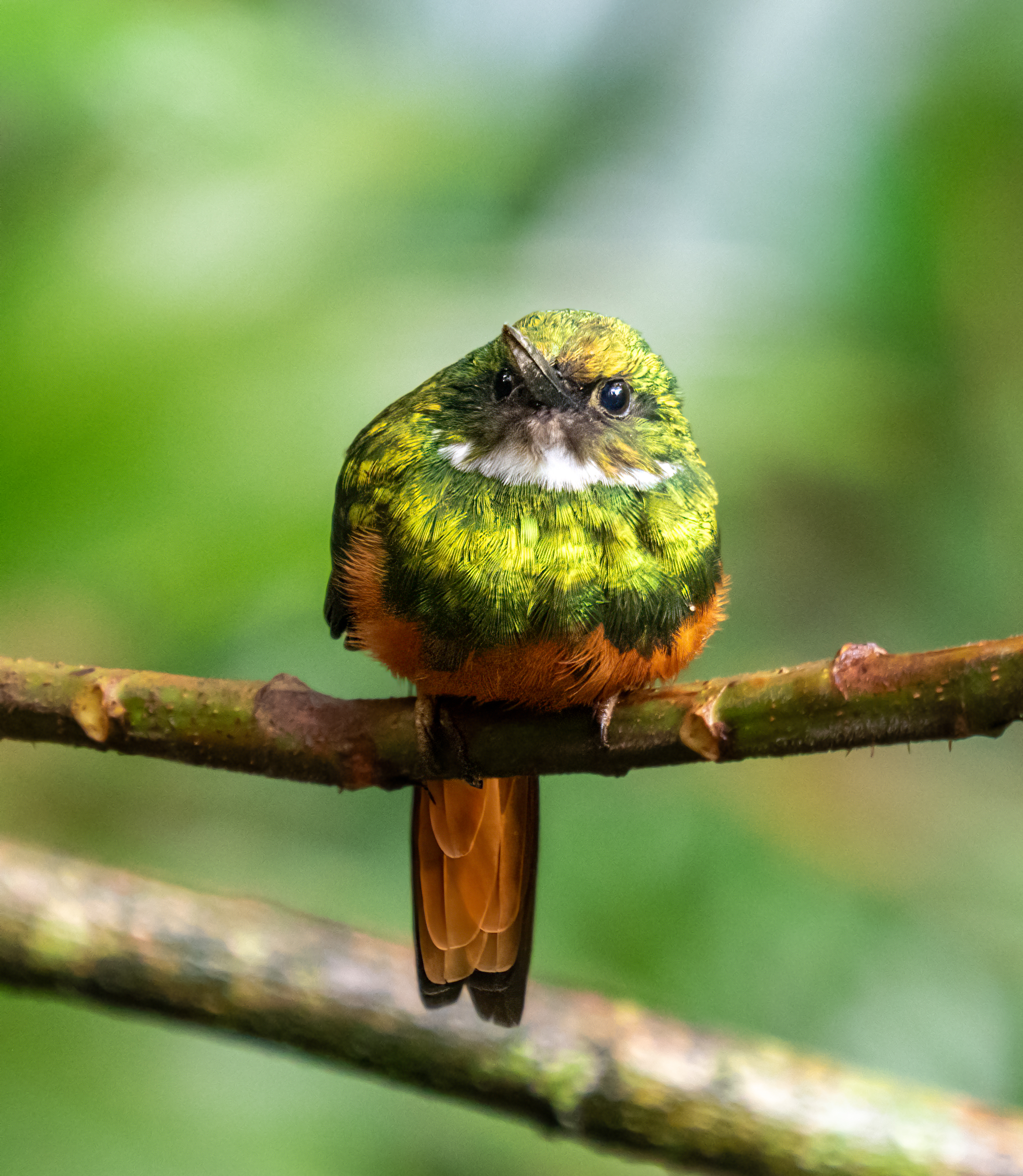
Male Rufous-tailed jacamar in Costa Rica.

=== Smithsonian Institution ===
Over the course of his career, Nutting would collaborate with the Smithsonian Institution. Upon completing his master's degree, he would be approached by the institute to go on some Central American expeditions for them to gather birds specimens. After finishing his doctor of philosophy degree and beginning his tenure at the University of Iowa, he still worked with the institution closely.

==== Costa Rica ====
Nutting's first expedition with the Smithsonian Institution would be to go to Costa Rica to collect specimens of birds. On February 13, 1882, Nutting arrived in Puntarenas, before traveling to San José and the Irazú Volcano. Throughout the trip, Nutting and his expedition group secured many specimens, with some of them being the Blue-black grosbeak(then classified as Guiraca cyanoides concreta, now Cyanoloxia cyanoides concreta), Bronzed cowbird (Molothrus aeneus), American pygmy kingfisher (then classified as Ceryle superciliosa, now Chloroceryle aenea), Spot-breasted oriole (Icterus pectoralis espinachi), Rufous-tailed jacamar (Galbula ruficauda melanogenia), Northern jacana (then classified as Parra gymnostoma, now Jacana spinosa), and Ornate hawk-eagle.

==== Nicaragua ====
In 1883, Nutting again went on an expedition to Central America for the Smithsonian Institution, this time in Nicaragua. He arrived in San Juan del Sur on January 4, 1883, and the expedition included stops in Ometepe island, Boca de Sábalos, and Sucuyá, a town roughly four miles north of Rivas. This trip yielded many specimens, including the Red-legged honeycreeper (then classified as Ccereba cyanea, now Cyanerpes cyaneus), Olivaceous woodcreeper (Sittasomus olivaceus), Lesson's motmot (Momotus lessoni), Collared aracari (Pteroglossus torquatus), Northern parula (then classified as Parula inornata, now Setophaga pitiayumi inornata), Boat-billed flycatcher (Megarhynchus pitangua), and White-breasted wood wren (Henicorhina leucosticta).

In total, the bird specimens from Nicaragua amounted to 100 specimens of 53 species from San Juan del Sur; 199 specimens of 75 species from Sucuyá; 136 specimens of 45 species from Ometepe island; and 167 specimens of 76 species from Boca de Sábalos. In addition to bird specimens, Nutting also collected many other things for the Smithsonian Institution while in Nicaragua, such as burial urns, including some painted urns, stone carvings of a human head, as well as human skulls and bones.

=== University of Iowa ===
Nutting started his doctor of philosophy degree in 1886, where he studied under Biologist and Professor Thomas Macbride and Geologist and Professor Samuel Calvin. In the same year, he was appointed the curator of the university's museum of natural history, a position he held for the following 41 years. During his time as curator, he attracted many donations with one such donation having over 7,000 specimens, including specimens of Passenger pigeons, Whooping cranes, and Carolina parakeets. In 1889, he was made the head of the new Department of Systematic Zoology and began research on the taxonomy and geographic distribution of animals.

Another interest of Nutting's was marine biology, an area where he published many works surrounding the topic marine hydroids. In his three volume collection American Hydroids, he introduced 134 new species.

== Selected works ==
- Nutting, Charles Cleveland (1895). Native and Preliminary Report of Bahama Expedition, by C. C. Nutting. State University of Iowa. OCLC 2616859^{[9]}
- — (1900–1915). American Hydroids. Government Printing Office. OCLC 458945352^{[10]}
  - Volume I: The Plumularidae (1900).
  - Volume II: The Sertularidae (1904).
  - Volume III: The Campanularidae and the Bonneviellidae (1915).
- — (1901). The Hydroids of the Woods Hole Region, by C. C. Nutting. Government Printing Office. OCLC 16493865
- — (August 1903). "The Bird Rookeries on the Island of Laysan". The Popular Science Monthly. Vol. 63. pp. 321–332. ISSN 0032-4647^{[11]}
- —; et al. (United States Fish Commission) (1905). Hydroids of the Hawaiian Island Collected by the Steamer Albatross in 1902. Government Printing Office. OCLC 13647499
- — (1919). Barbados-Antigua Expedition: Narrative and Preliminary Report of a Zoological Expedition. State University of Iowa. OCLC 1366082571

== Sources ==
- University of Iowa Natural History Museum: Our first 100 years.
- Stoner, Dayton (1927). "Charles Cleveland Nutting". Science. 65 (1676): 151–152. Bibcode:1927Sci....65..151S. doi:10.1126/science.65.1676.151. JSTOR 1651984. PMID 17818689.
- This article incorporates text from the second edition of The New International Encyclopedia vol. 17 (1916): p. 316.
