= Charles William Nutting =

RAF Air Vice-Marshal (1889-1964)

- Born: 15 April 1889
- Died: 25 February 1964 (aged 74)
- Military career
- Allegiance: United Kingdom
- Branch: Royal Navy (1915–18); Royal Air Force (1918–42)
- Service years: 1915-42
- Rank: Air Vice Marshal
- Commands: No. 3 Flying Training School (1932–37); RAF Hal Far (1929–31)
- Conflicts: First World War; Second World War
- Awards: Commander of the Order of the British Empire; Distinguished Service Cross; Mentioned in Despatches

Air Vice Marshal Charles William Nutting, CBE, DSC (15 April 1889 – 25 February 1964) was a wireless officer in the Royal Naval Air Service during the First World War, a Royal Air Force signals specialist during the inter-war years and the RAF's Director / Director-General of Signals during the first half of the Second World War. He retired from the RAF in 1942 and spent the remainder of the war as the Telecommunications Adviser to the British minister in the Middle East.

== Honours and awards ==
- 22 June 1916 – Lieutenant Charles William Nutting RNVR, Lieutenant Edward Raymond Peal, RNVR and Sub-Lieutenant Horace William Furnival, RNR are each awarded the Distinguished Service Cross:

In recognition of their services as aeroplane observers and continuous good work whilst attached to a Wing of the Royal Naval Air Service at Dunkirk.

— London Gazette

- 11 July 1940 – Air Commodore Charles William Nutting OBE, DSC, Royal Air Force is promoted to a Commander of the Order of the British Empire.
