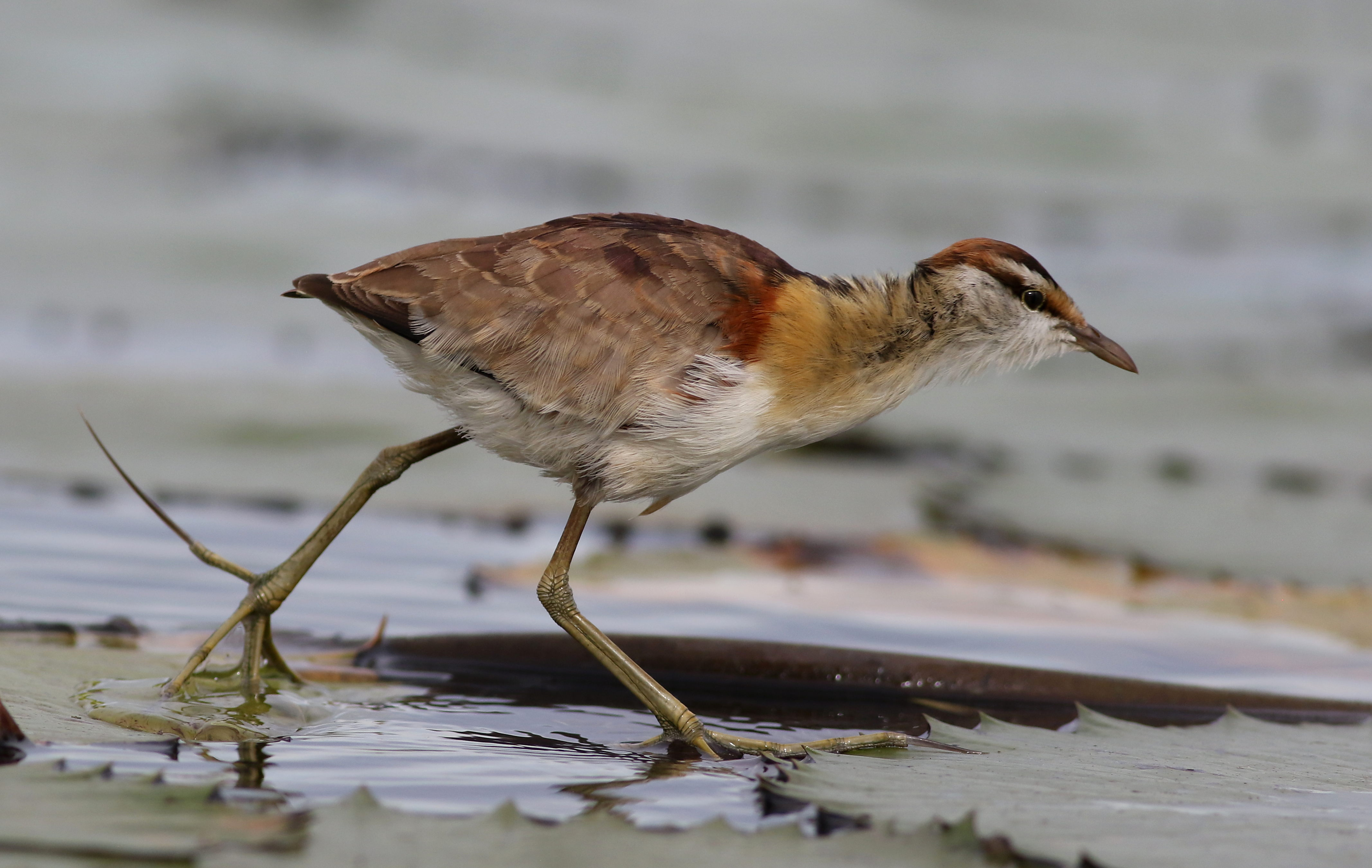
- Botswana

Conservation status
- Least Concern (IUCN 3.1)

Scientific classification
- Kingdom: Animalia
- Phylum: Chordata
- Class: Aves
- Order: Charadriiformes
- Family: Jacanidae
- Genus: Microparra; Cabanis, 1877
- Species: M. capensis

Binomial name
- Microparra capensis (Smith, 1839)

= Lesser jacana =

Species of bird

The lesser jacana (Microparra capensis) is a wader in the family Jacanidae and can be found in Africa. It can be recognized by its long legs and claws that allow it to walk on aquatic vegetation – although it is not to be confused with the larger African Jacana. The lesser jacana is insectivorous. Its conservation status is of least concern.

The name jacana is derived from a Tupi name of the bird, ñaha'nã.

== Description ==
The smallest species in the Jacanidae family, the lesser jacana is 15–16 cm (5.9–6.3 in) tall and weighs 41 g (1.4 oz). It has a white breast, golden forehead, cinnamon crown, and dark eyestripe. Its mantle and wings are also darker. As other jacanas, they have long legs and claws which are adapted for walking on lily-pads and aquatic grasses – which is why jacanas are sometimes referred to as lily trotters or Jesus birds because they appear as though they are walking on the surface of the water.

Lesser jacana eggs resemble African jacana eggs but are smaller. African jacana juveniles closely resemble adult lesser jacanas, and the two may be confused as their range overlaps in Southern Africa.

In the field, lesser jacanas are reportedly more easily identifiable when flying as they may hide in aquatic vegetation. In flight, its legs appear long and trail behind its body. Its wings have a white trailing edge.

The lesser jacana has minimal sexual dimorphism, with males and females being nearly identical, although the female is on average 4% larger than the male. Males are reported to have darker backs than females.

== Taxonomy ==
The lesser jacana is one of eight species in the family Jacanidae. It is monotypic within the genus Microparra meaning it does not have any sub-species. Within the family Jacanidae, the lesser jacana is most closely related to the comb-crested jacana of Australia – these two species are considered to be of the same clade. The family Jacanidae is divided into two clades: 1) the comb-crested, lesser jacana, bronze-winged jacana, african jacana, and 2) pheasant-tailed jacana, wattled jacana, northern jacana.

== Habitat and Distribution ==
The lesser jacana can be found in wetland habitats in Angola, Botswana, Burkina Faso, Burundi, Cameroon, Central African Republic, Chad, Democratic Republic of the Congo, Eswatini, Ivory Coast, Ethiopia, Kenya, Malawi, Mali, Mauritania, Mozambique, Namibia, Niger, Nigeria, Rwanda, Sierra Leone, South Africa, Sudan, Tanzania, Uganda, Zambia, and Zimbabwe. They occupy the shorelines of permanent and seasonally flooded wetlands in Africa. They hang out in areas that are partially grown with sedge and grass. As new pools are filled with rainfall, lesser jacanas may move into these newly flooded habitats. They favor areas where sedge and grass cover is sparse, but more abundant as compared to water lilies. They use aquatic vegetation for cover and may be inconspicuous as a result.

Lesser jacanas range overlaps with that of the African Jacana, and these species often coexist.

== Behaviour ==
=== Diet ===
As the lesser jacana trots across lily pads or climbs grass stems, it is able to forage insects from emergent vegetation. It has been observed to peck insects off surrounding vegetation, to search for insects by lifting submerged stems out of the water with its bill, and to swim for food at the water's surface.

=== Reproduction ===
Lesser jacanas are unique in their mating. All other jacanas in the Jacanidae family display a polyandrous mating strategy. Sex roles are reversed in these other jacana species, as males perform parental care and females breed with multiple species. Females are resultantly slightly larger than males in these other jacanas. Observations of the lesser jacana show that they do not follow this mating strategy. Lesser jacanas practice biparental care where both parents cooperate in caring for their young. Unlike other jacana species where the male takes on the role of incubating the chicks by himself, the male and female of the lesser jacana are both involved in nest-building and incubate the eggs equally. The lesser jacana shows minimal sexual dimorphism as a result. They have been observed to be monogamous. To reproduce, the male mounts the females back and copulation averages 7 seconds – shorter than other jacana species due to lower levels of sperm competition.

The lesser jacana lays two or three tan-colored eggs with black markings in a floating nest. Their eggs are identical in appearance to eggs of the African Jacana, but are smaller. Eggs are incubated for 19–21 days. To incubate, males and females hold their eggs against their breast with the underside of their wing. Once hatched, parents brood their young under their wing. When chicks face an apparent danger, the parent collects its chick and carries it under its wing.

=== Vocalizations ===
Lesser jacanas have been observed to make five distinct vocalizations. The first of these is a distress call that the lesser jacana will produce when its chicks are approached, a chatter that sounds like "hwi hwi hwi …." The most common vocalization is a melodic, low-pitch "woot" produced by both sexes. It has also been observed vocalizing a peeving "see sree shrrr," a soft "tchr tchr tchr," and repeating a "ti" or "hli" sound. If a lesser jacana was observed to call, its mate was seen to make this same call in response or synchronously. Prior to copulation, males have been observed to vocalize a hoot-like call to lure females toward him.
