= African jacana =

- Lake Baringo, Kenya

Conservation status
- Least Concern (IUCN 3.1)

Scientific classification
- Kingdom: Animalia
- Phylum: Chordata
- Class: Aves
- Order: Charadriiformes
- Family: Jacanidae
- Genus: Actophilornis
- Species: A. africanus

Binomial name
- Actophilornis africanus (Gmelin, JF, 1789)
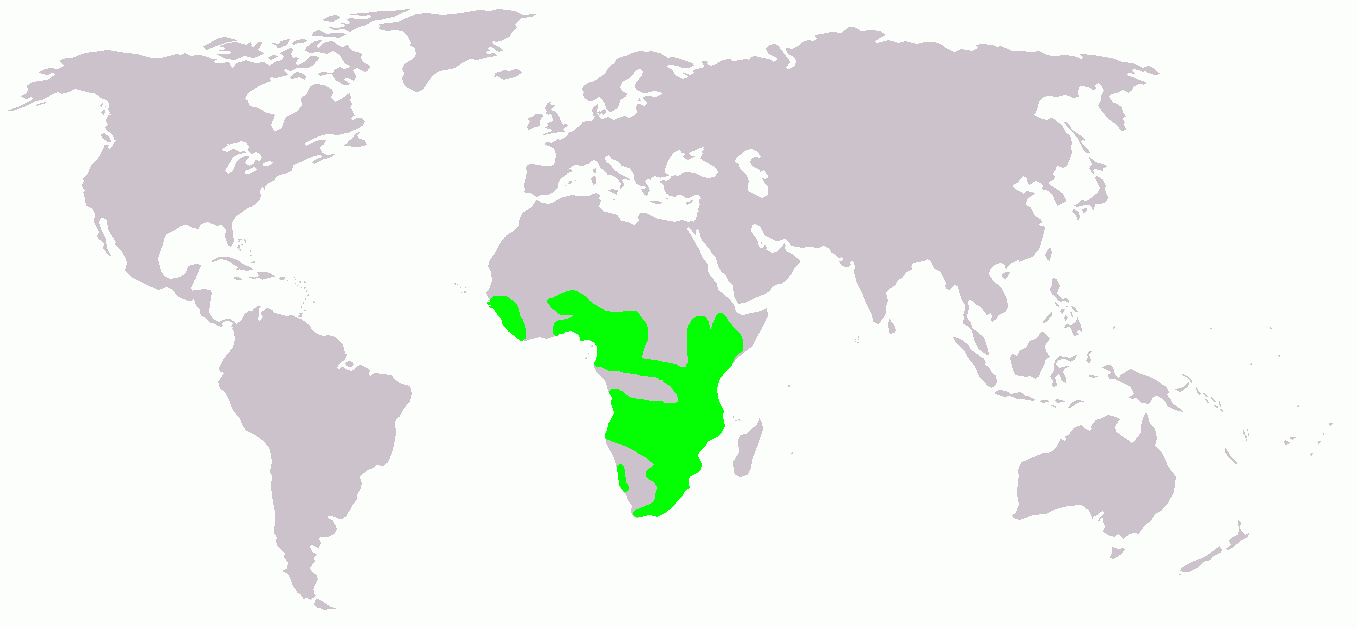

Species of bird

The African jacana (Actophilornis africanus) is a wader in the family Jacanidae. It has long toes and long claws that enable it to walk on floating vegetation in shallow lakes, its preferred habitat. It is widely distributed in sub-Saharan Africa. For the origin and pronunciation of the name, see Jacanidae.

== Taxonomy ==
The African jacana was formally described in 1789 by the German naturalist Johann Friedrich Gmelin in his revised and expanded edition of Carl Linnaeus's Systema Naturae. He placed it in the genus Parra and coined the binomial name Parra africana. Gmelin based his description on that by the English ornithologist John Latham who in 1785 had described and illustrated the species in his A General Synopsis of Birds. Gmelin and Latham gave the locality as "Africa": this was restricted to Ethiopia in 1915. The African jacana is now placed in the genus Actophilornis that was introduced in 1925 by the American ornithologist Harry C. Oberholser. The genus name combines the Ancient Greek aktē meaning "river bank" or "coastal strand", -philos meaning "-loving" and ornis meaning "bird". The species is considered to be monotypic: no subspecies are recognised.

== Description ==
The African jacana is a conspicuous and unmistakable bird. It measures 23 to 31 cm (9.1 to 12.2 in) in overall length. As in other jacanas, the female is on average larger than the male. Males can weigh from 115 to 224 g (4.1 to 7.9 oz), averaging 137 g (4.8 oz) and females from 167 to 290 g (5.9 to 10.2 oz), averaging 261 g (9.2 oz). Alongside the similarly-sized Madagascar jacana, this appears to be the heaviest jacana species. They have chestnut upperparts with black wingtips, rear neck, and eyestripe. The underparts are also chestnut in the adults, only in juveniles they are white with a chestnut belly patch. The blue bill extends up as a coot-like head shield, and the legs and long toes are grey.

== Behaviour ==
=== Food and feeding ===
African jacanas feed on insects and other invertebrates picked from the floating vegetations or the surface of the water.

=== Breeding ===
African jacanas breed throughout sub-Saharan Africa. It is sedentary apart from seasonal dispersion. It lays four black-marked brown eggs in a floating nest.

The jacana has evolved a highly unusual polyandrous mating system, meaning that one female mates with multiple males and the male alone cares for the chicks. Such a system has evolved due to a combination of two factors: firstly, the lakes that the jacana lives on are so resource-rich that the relative energy expended by the female in producing each egg is effectively negligible. Secondly the jacana, as a bird, lays eggs, and eggs can be equally well incubated and cared for by a parent bird of either sex. This means that the rate-limiting factor of the jacana's breeding is the rate at which the males can raise and care for the chicks. Such a system of females forming harems of males is in direct contrast to the more usual system of leks seen in animals such as stags and grouse, where the males compete and display in order to gain harems of females.

The parent that forms part of the harem is almost always the one that ends up caring for the offspring; in this case, each male jacana incubates and rears a nest of chicks. The male African jacana has therefore evolved some remarkable adaptations for parental care, such as the ability to pick up and carry chicks underneath its wings.

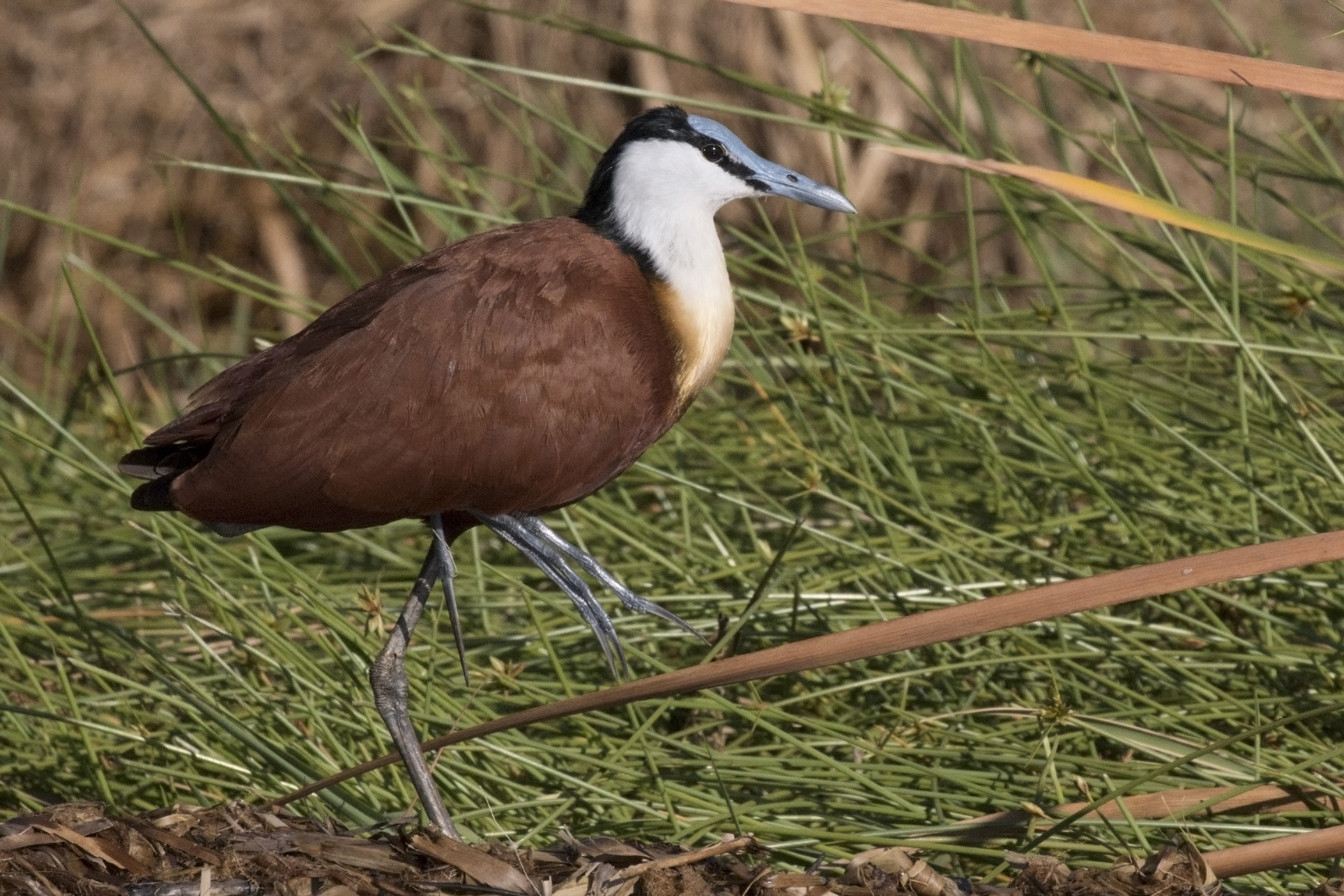
Adult, Lake Baringo, Kenya

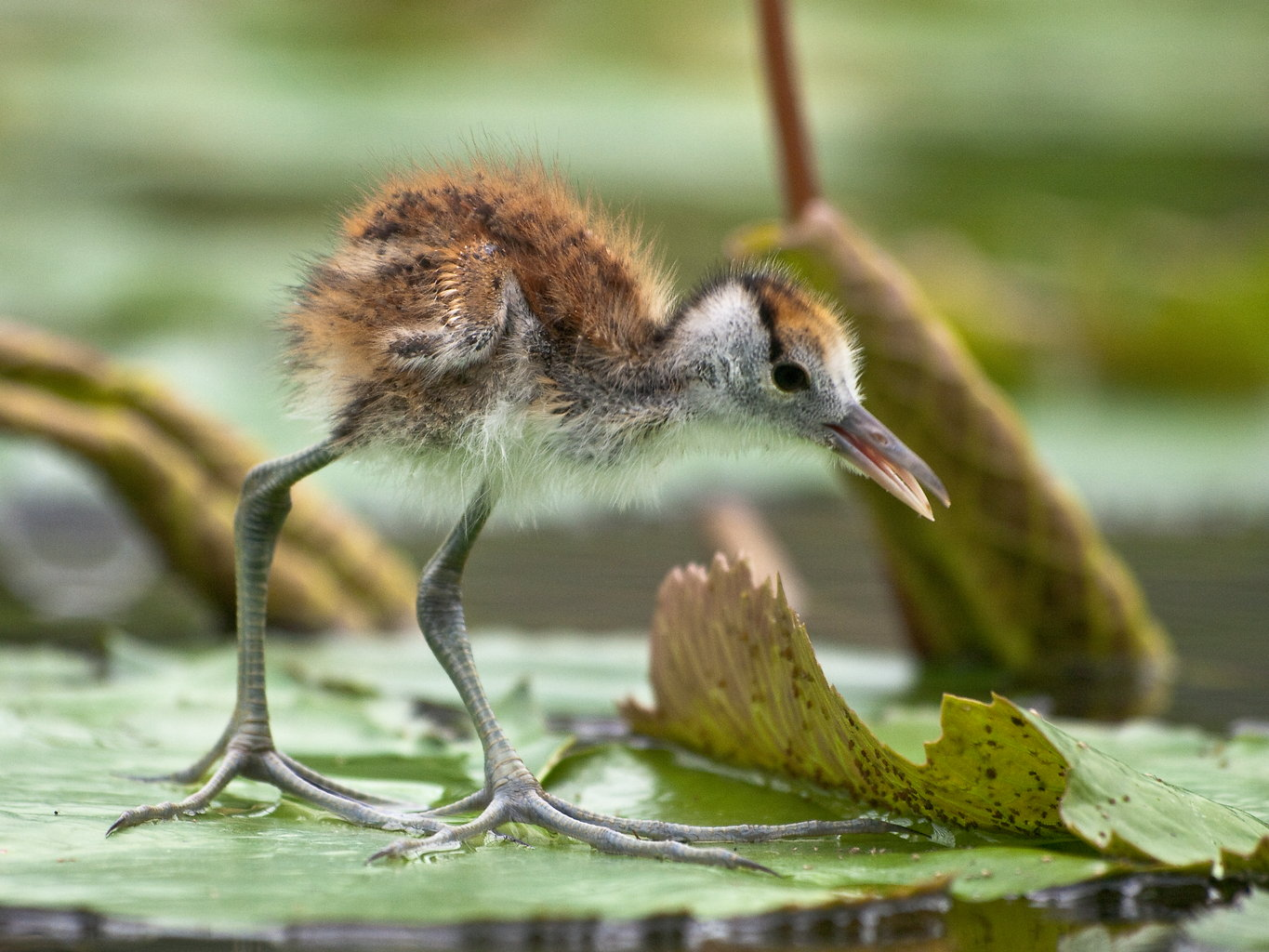
Chick at Kakegawa, Shizuoka, Japan

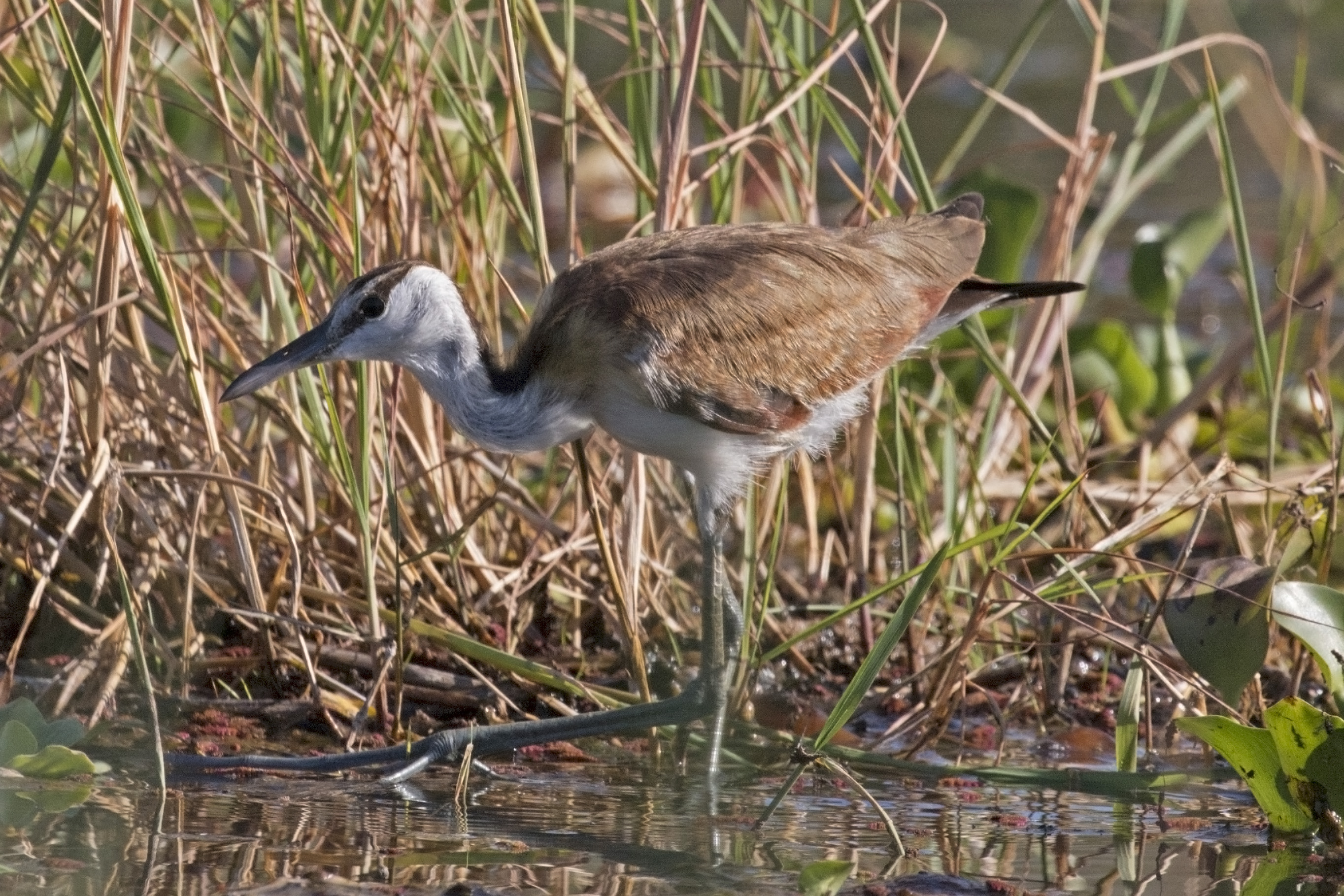
Juvenile, Lake Baringo, Kenya

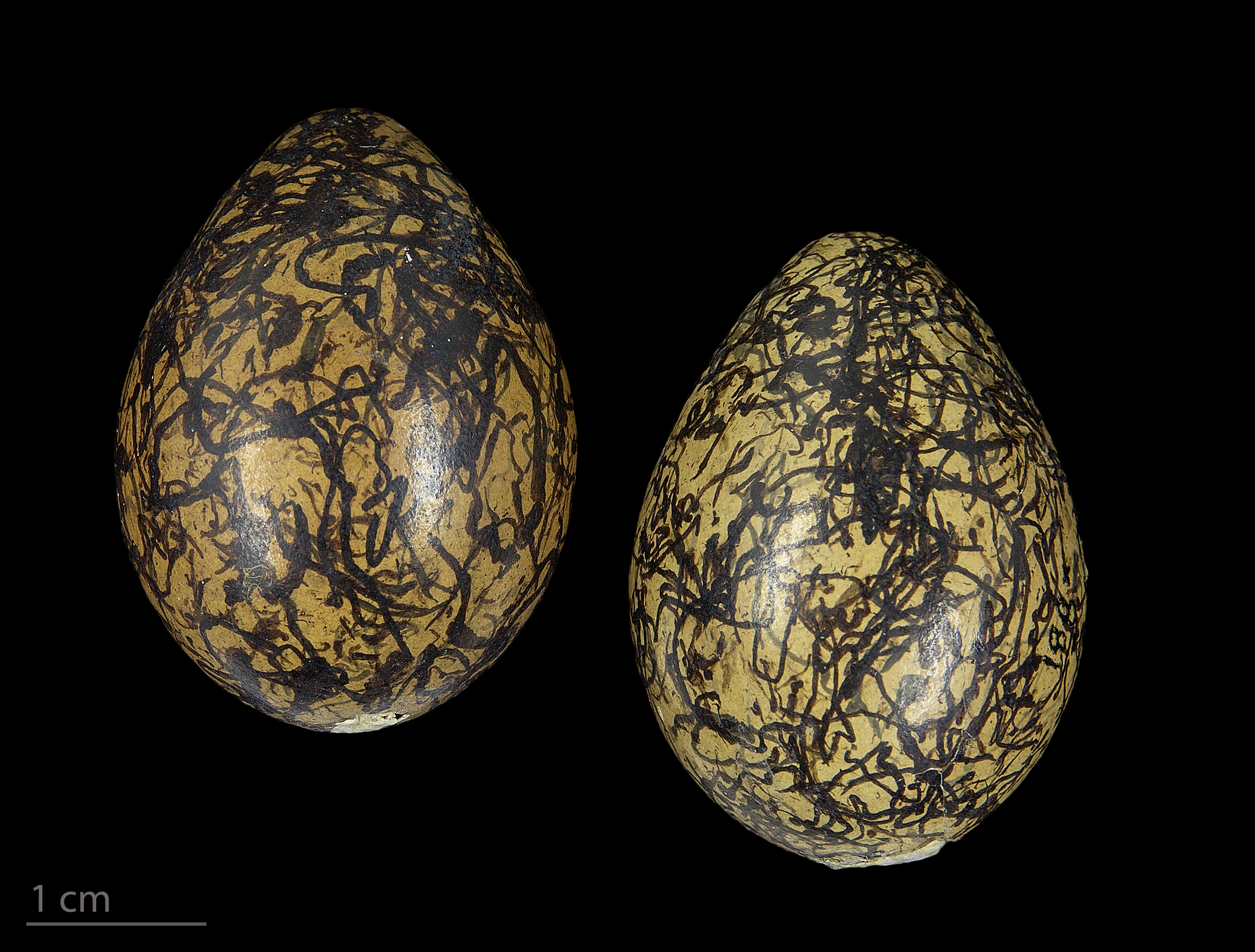
Actophilornis africanus - MHNT
