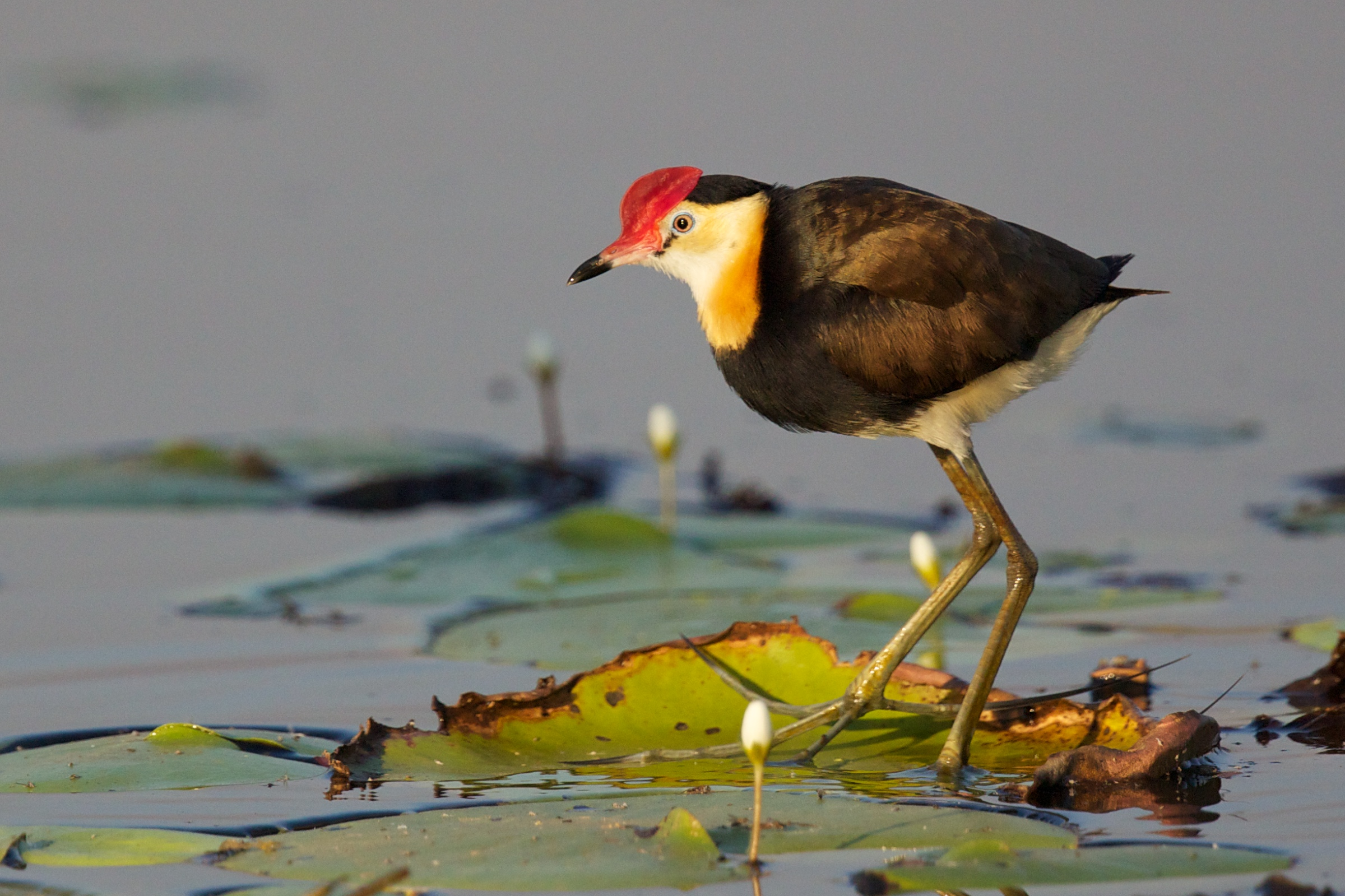
- Comb-crested jacana (Irediparra gallinacea)

Scientific classification
- Kingdom: Animalia
- Phylum: Chordata
- Class: Aves
- Order: Charadriiformes
- Suborder: Scolopaci
- Family: Jacanidae; Chenu & Des Murs, 1854

Type genus
- Jacana

Genera
- Microparra; Actophilornis; Irediparra; Hydrophasianus; Metopidius; Jacana

Synonyms
- Parridae

= Jacanidae =

Jacanas Temporal range: Oligocene to recent

Family of birds

The jacanas (sometimes referred to as Jesus birds or lily trotters) are a group of tropical waders in the family Jacanidae. They are found in tropical regions around the world. They are noted for their elongated toes and toenails that allow them to spread out their weight while foraging on floating or semi-emergent aquatic vegetation. They are also among the somewhat rare groups of birds in which females are larger, and several species maintain harems of males in the breeding season with males solely responsible for incubating eggs and taking care of the chicks.

== Taxonomy ==
The family Jacanidae was introduced in 1854 by the French naturalists Jean-Charles Chenu and Marc des Murs. They used the spelling "Jacaneinae". The modern spelling "Jacanidae" was used by Leonhard Stejneger in 1885.

The pronunciation of the word jacana is debated. Jacana is Linnæus' scientific Latin spelling of the Portuguese jaçanã which in turn is derived from a Tupi name of the bird, ñaha'nã. The Portuguese word is pronounced approximately [ʒɐsɐˈnɐ̃]. As in façade, Provençal, and araçari, the Ç is meant to be pronounced as an S. US dictionaries give various pronunciations: /ˌʒɑːsəˈnɑː/ ZHAH-sə-NAH, /ˌdʒɑːsəˈnɑː/ JAH-sə-NAH, as well as the anglicised /dʒəˈkɑːnə/ jə-KAH-nə, which is the only pronunciation in an Australian dictionary. A British dictionary gives /ˈdʒækənə/ JAK-ə-nə for the spelling "jacana" and /ʒæsəˈnɑː/ zhass-ə-NAH for "jaçana".

== Diversity ==
Relationships of the Jacanidae

- - - Lari
    - Scolopaci
      - Scolopacidae
      - - - Jacanidae
          - Rostratulidae
        - - Pedionomidae
          - Thinocoridae
  - Charadrii

Eight species of extant jacana are known from six genera and four fossil species have been described from the Oligocene of Egypt and from the Pliocene of Florida. A fossil from Miocene strata in the Czech Republic was assigned to this family, but more recent analysis disputes the placement and moves the species to the Coraciidae.

Jacanas are identifiable by their elongated toes and claws which enable them to walk on floating vegetation in the shallow lakes that are their preferred habitat. They have sharp bills and rounded wings, some with carpal spurs, and many species also have wattles and frontal lappets on their foreheads. Jacanas were once placed in the family Parridae based on the genus Parra but the family name is now Jacanidae based on the type genus Jacana. The family is placed within the order Charadriiformes under the suborder Scolopaci and is a sister of the Rostratulidae. They have 10 tail feathers unlike most others wader groups which have twelve. They have a rudimentary caecum. Most jacanas have five neck vertebrae with the exception of Hydrophasianus chirurgus which has six.

Wing bone adaptations in the jacanas

In terms of sexual size dimorphism, female jacanas are larger than the males but are alike in plumage. The latter, as in some other waders like the phalaropes, take responsibility for incubation and care of chicks, and most species (with the exception of the monogamous lesser jacana) are polyandrous. They construct relatively flimsy nests on floating vegetation, and lay eggs with dark irregular lines on their shells, providing camouflage amongst water weeds. The eggs are slightly smaller than in comparable species and it has been considered that this may be due to an evolutionary tradeoff given the larger number of clutches that are laid. Male jacanas brood eggs between the wings and the body. This wing-brooding may be assisted by a special adaptation in the wing bones with either a broadening of the radius or a widening of the gap between the radius and ulna. Young chicks may also be held under the wing and transported to safety by the parent bird in some species. Young chicks dive underwater and stay submerged with only their bill out of water. Some adult jacanas also use the same technique. African jacanas go through a simultaneous moult of their flight feathers leading to a period of flightlessness. Their moult is related to their ability to breed opportunistically based on the availability of rains.

Their diet consists mainly of insects and other invertebrates picked from floating vegetation or the water's surface but plant seeds may also be eaten. Wattled jacanas are known to pick ticks off capybaras. The stomach contents of jacanas have been found to include algae, as well as plant roots and stems, but it is thought that this may be incidentally ingested along with their invertebrate prey.

Most species have rounded wings and short tails. The flight tends to be slow and weak. Most species are sedentary, but the pheasant-tailed jacana migrates from the north of its range into peninsular India and southeast Asia.

== Species ==
- - - Jacana
    - Hydrophasianus
  - - - - Microparra
        - Irediparra
      - Metopidius
    - Actophilornis

Phylogeny of the extant genera within the Jacanidae based on an analysis of mitochondrial gene sequences

Species	Common name	Distribution	
Microparra capensis	Lesser jacana	Central and southeastern Africa	
Actophilornis africanus	African jacana	Central and southern Africa	
Actophilornis albinucha	Madagascar jacana	Madagascar	
Irediparra gallinacea	Comb-crested jacana	Malaysia, northeastern Australia	
Hydrophasianus chirurgus	Pheasant-tailed jacana	Asia	
Metopidius indicus	Bronze-winged jacana	Asia	
Jacana spinosa	Northern jacana	Mexico, Central America	
Jacana jacana	Wattled jacana	Panama, northeastern South America	
Extinct species
†Jacana farrandi		Pliocene, Florida	
†Janipes nymphaeobates		Lower Oligocene, Egypt	
†Nupharanassa bulotorum		Lower Oligocene, Egypt	
†Nupharanassa tolutaria		Lower Oligocene, Egypt	
†Boutersemia belgica?		Lower Oligocene, Belgium	Note: recovered as a jacanid in a morphology-based phylogenetic analysis, but suggested to be a member of the family Glareolidae based on other anatomical observations
†Boutersemia parvula?		Lower Oligocene, Belgium	
