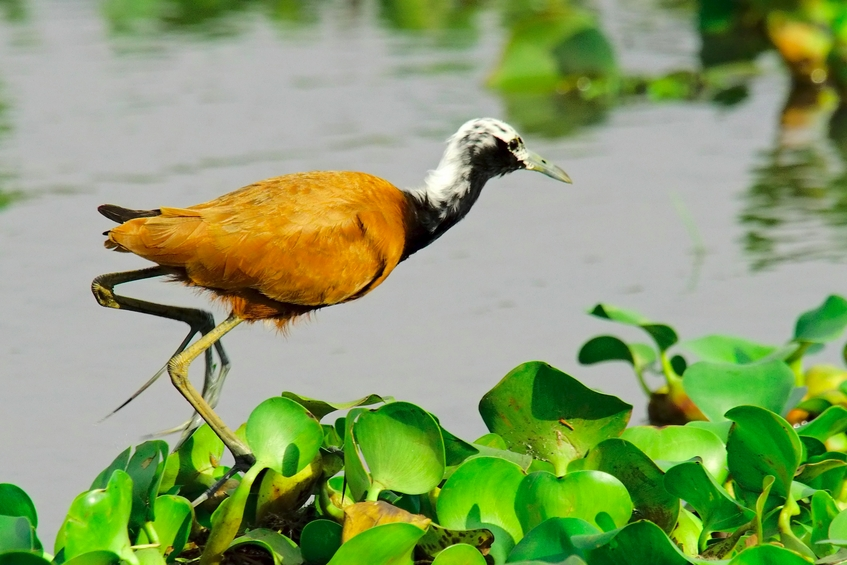

Conservation status
- Endangered (IUCN 3.1)

Scientific classification
- Kingdom: Animalia
- Phylum: Chordata
- Class: Aves
- Order: Charadriiformes
- Family: Jacanidae
- Genus: Actophilornis
- Species: A. albinucha

Binomial name
- Actophilornis albinucha (Geoffroy Saint-Hilaire, I, 1832)

= Madagascar jacana =

Species of bird

The Madagascar jacana (Actophilornis albinucha) is a species of bird in the family Jacanidae. It is endemic to Madagascar.

It is not wary of human activity, but it is hypothesized to be avoidant of the common moorhen. It inhabits different sites within Madagascar during wet versus dry season. Female Madagascar jacanas are significantly larger than males.
