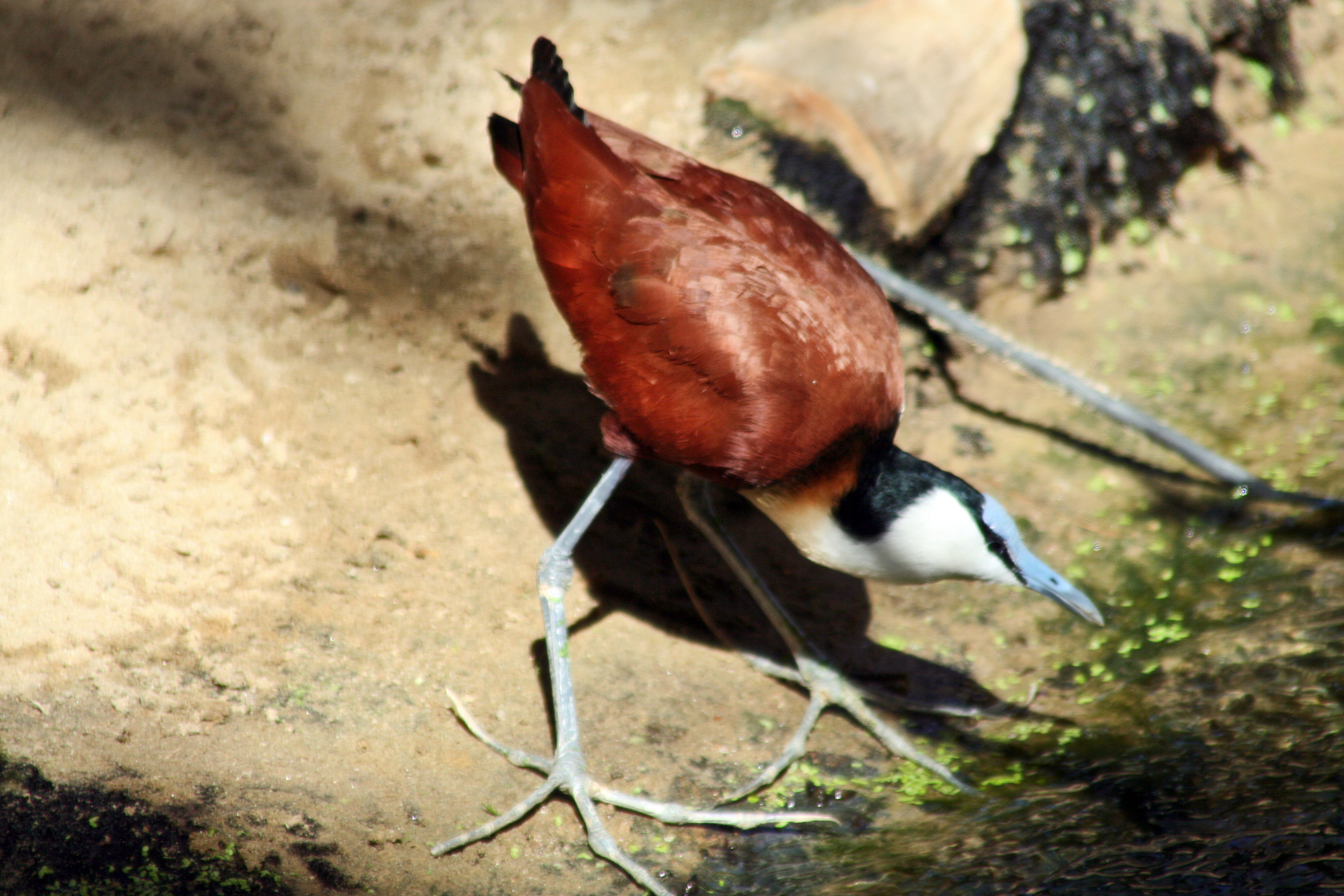
- African jacana, Actophilornis africanus

Scientific classification
- Kingdom: Animalia
- Phylum: Chordata
- Class: Aves
- Order: Charadriiformes
- Family: Jacanidae
- Genus: Actophilornis; Oberholser, 1925

Type species
- Parra africana (African jacana) Gmelin, JF, 1789

= Actophilornis =

Genus of birds

Actophilornis is a genus of jacana. It contains two species restricted to Africa and its surrounding islands.

== Taxonomy ==
The genus Actophilornis was introduced in 1925 by the American ornithologist Harry C. Oberholser with the African jacana as the type species. Actophilornis was a replacement name for Actophilus which was pre-occupied. The name combines the Ancient Greek aktē meaning "river bank" or "coastal strand", -philos meaning "-loving" and ornis meaning "bird".

The genus contains two species:

- African jacana, Actophilornis africanus
- Madagascar jacana, Actophilornis albinucha
