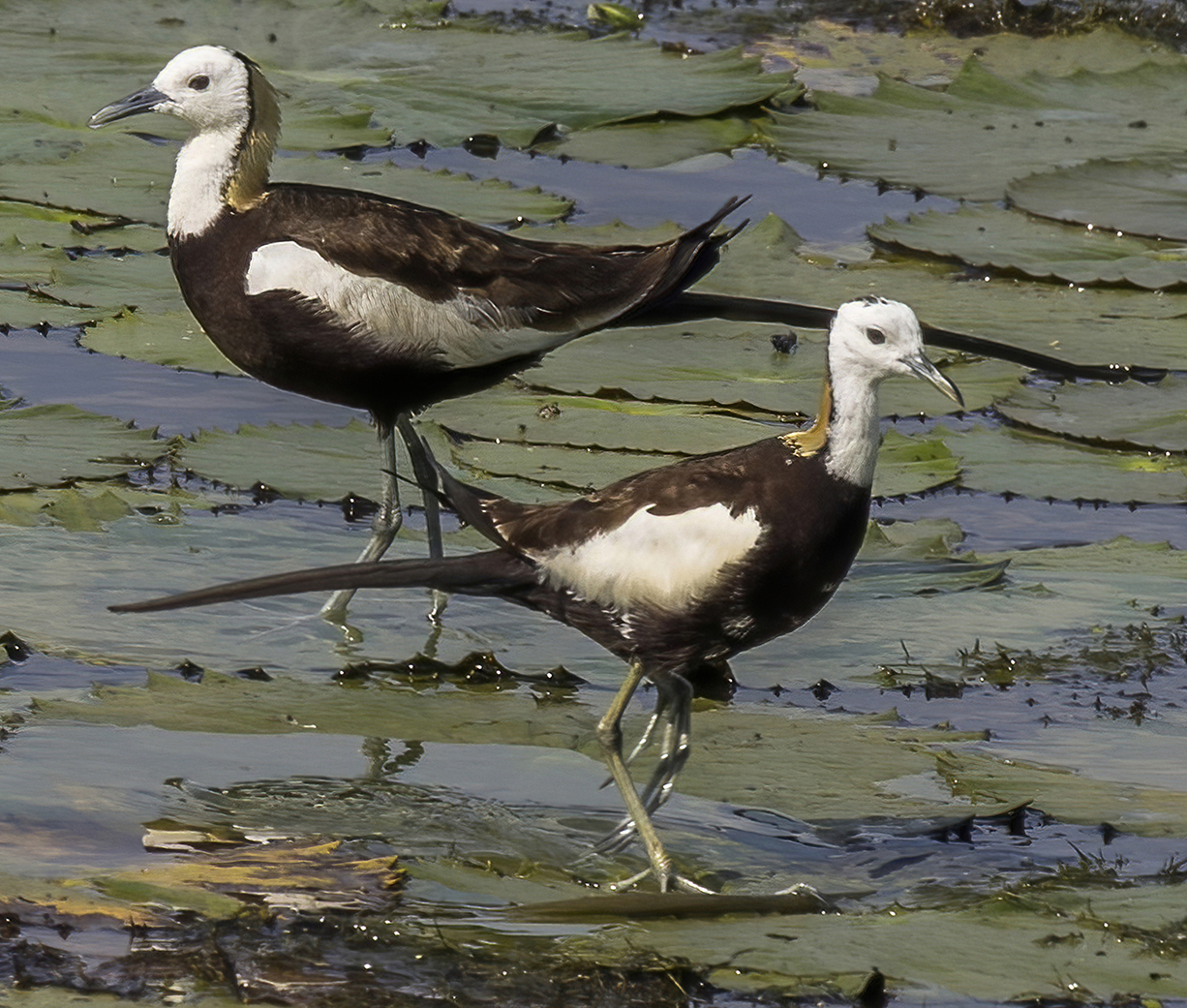
- The breeding plumage is marked by the elongated central tail feathers, white front and wing, and the silky golden nape feathers

Conservation status
- Least Concern (IUCN 3.1)

Scientific classification
- Kingdom: Animalia
- Phylum: Chordata
- Class: Aves
- Order: Charadriiformes
- Family: Jacanidae
- Genus: Hydrophasianus; Wagler, 1832
- Species: H. chirurgus

Binomial name
- Hydrophasianus chirurgus (Scopoli, 1786)
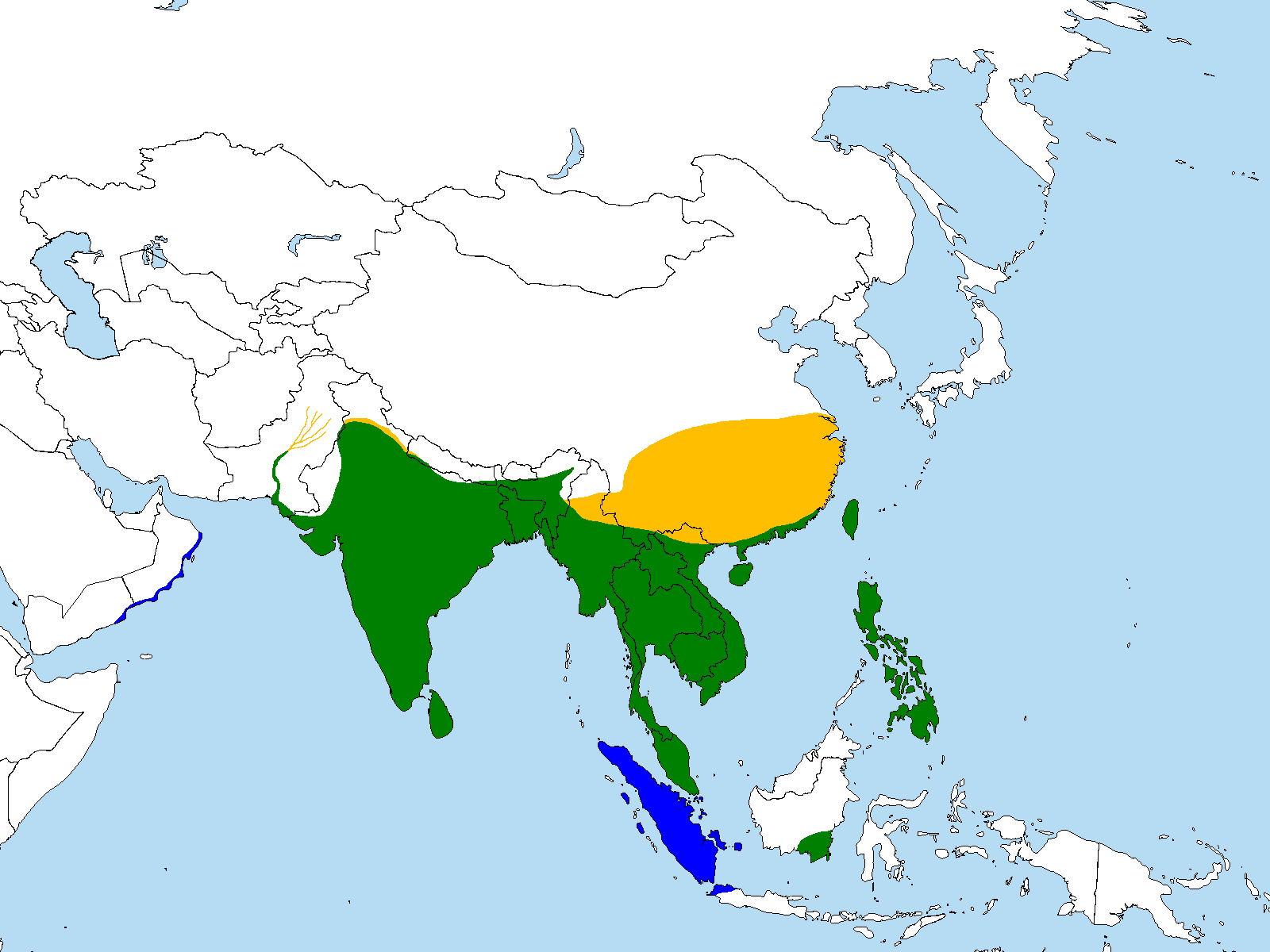

Synonyms
- Parra chinensis Parra luzonensis Tringa chirurgus

= Pheasant-tailed jacana =

Species of bird

The pheasant-tailed jacana (Hydrophasianus chirurgus) is a jacana in the monotypic genus Hydrophasianus. Like all other jacanas, they have elongated toes and nails that enable them to walk on floating vegetation in shallow lakes, their preferred habitat. They may also swim or wade in water reaching their body while foraging mainly for invertebrate prey. They are found in tropical Asia from Yemen in the west to the Philippines in the east and move seasonally in parts of their range. They are the only jacanas that migrate long distances and have different non-breeding and breeding plumages. The pheasant-tailed jacana forages by swimming or by walking on aquatic vegetation. Females are larger than males and are polyandrous, laying several clutches that are raised by different males in their harem.

== Description ==
The pheasant-tailed jacana is conspicuous and unmistakable. It is the longest species in the jacana family when the tail streamers are included. The breeding plumage is marked by the elongated central tail feathers that given the bird its name. The body is chocolate brown, the face is white, and the back of the crown is black with white stripes running down the sides of the neck, separating the white of the front of neck and the silky golden yellow of the nape. The wings are predominantly white. In flight the white wing shows a black border formed by black on the outermost primaries and the tips of the outer secondaries and the primaries. The wing coverts are pale brown and the scapulars may be glossed green or purple. In the non-breeding season the top of the head and back are dark brown and only a trace of the golden nape feathers may be seen. A dark eyestripe runs down the sides of the neck and forms a dark necklace on a slightly sullied white front. The outer two primaries have a slender (lanceolate or spatulate) extension that broadens at the tip. The fourth primary has an acute tip formed by the shaft after the loss of webbing. Young birds have brown upper parts and the dark necklace is broken. Some traces of the black stripe on the side of the neck and white wings separate them from somewhat similar looking immatures of the bronze-winged jacana. They have strongly developed sharp white carpal spurs which are longer in females. The spurs may also undergo moult, but this has not been specifically described in this species. The tail is short and strongly graduated. The bill is more slender than in the bronze-winged and is bluish-black with a yellow tip when breeding and dull brown with yellowish base when not breeding. The legs are dark bluish grey and the iris is brown.

Shufeldt described the skeletal features of a specimen from Luzon as being typical of jacanas except that the skull resembles in some ways those of sandpipers. The skull and mandibles are slightly pneumatized, unlike the other bones, and the sternum has a notch on the side which serve as attachment points to long and slender xiphoidal processes.

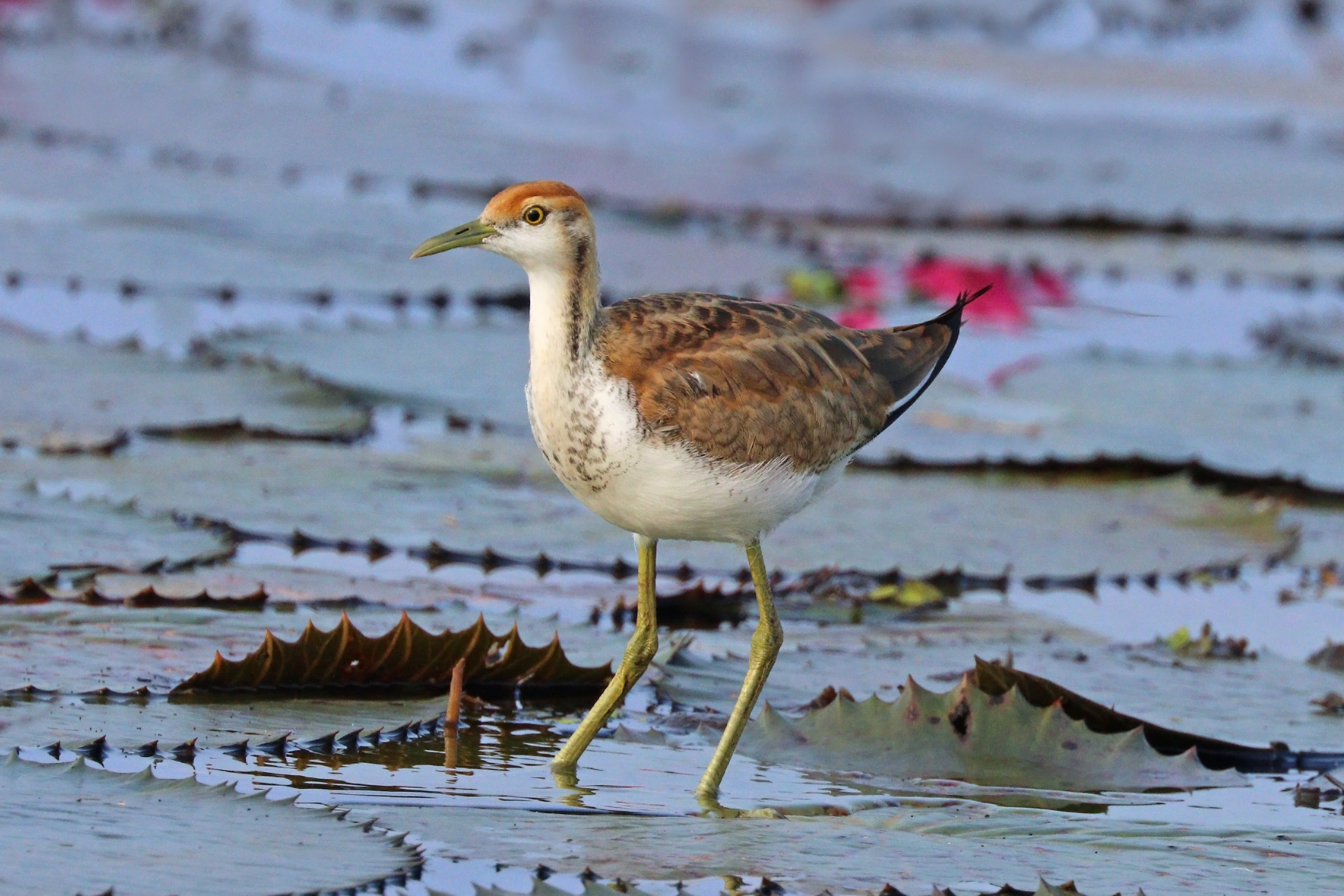
juvenile has a dark stripe on the side of the neck, unlike a young bronze-winged jacana.

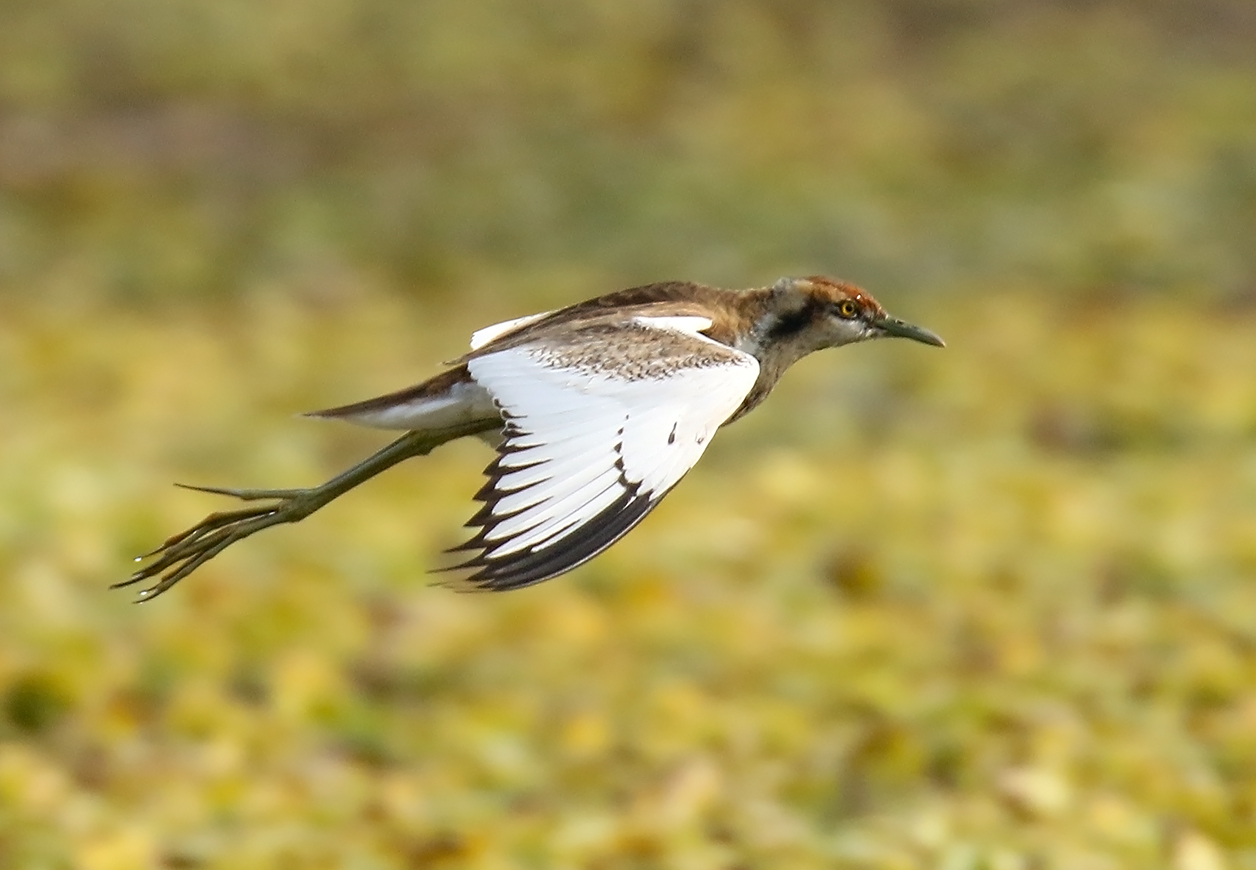
Non breeding plumage

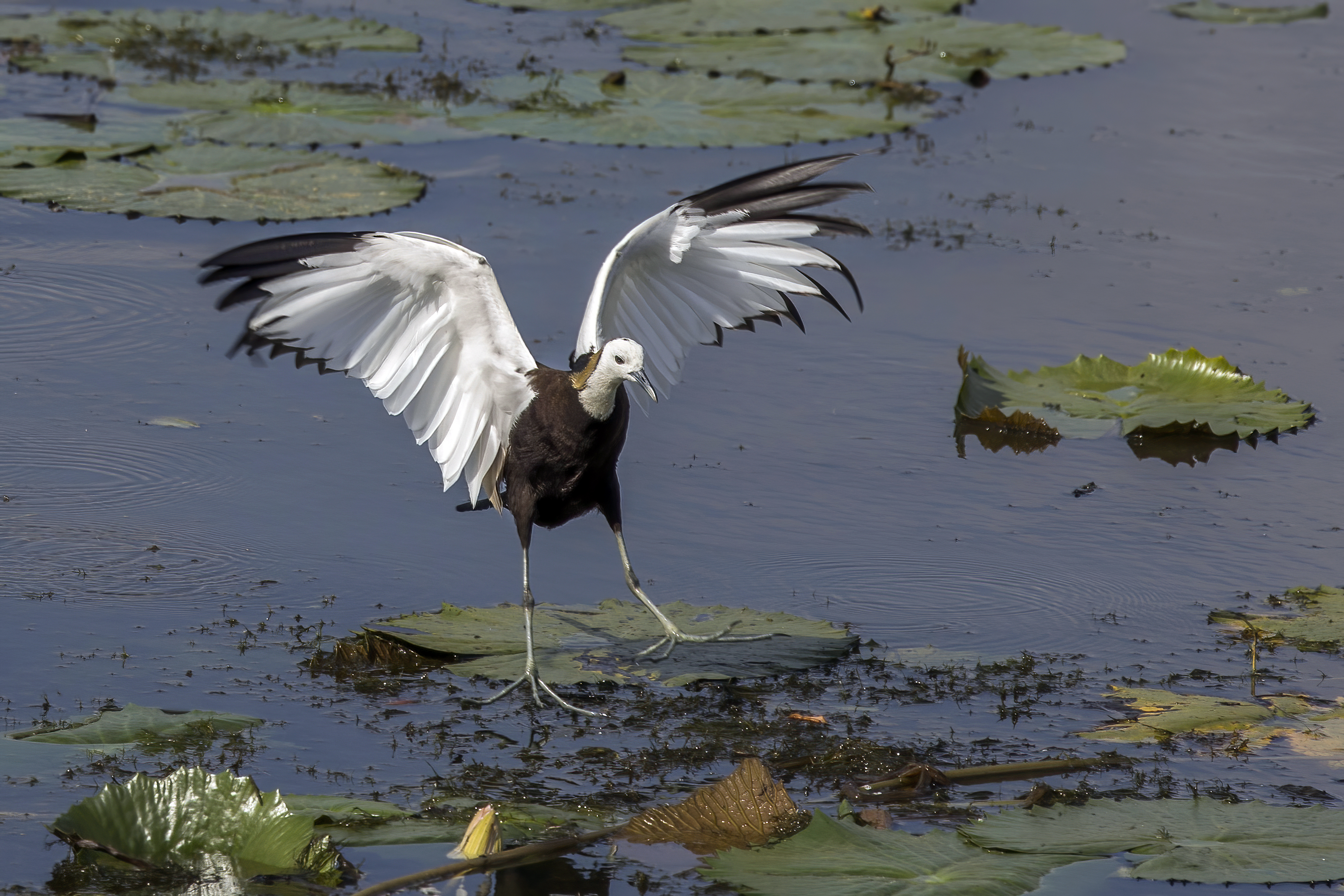
Breeding plumage
The pointed tip of the fourth primary is visible in flight

== Taxonomy and systematics ==
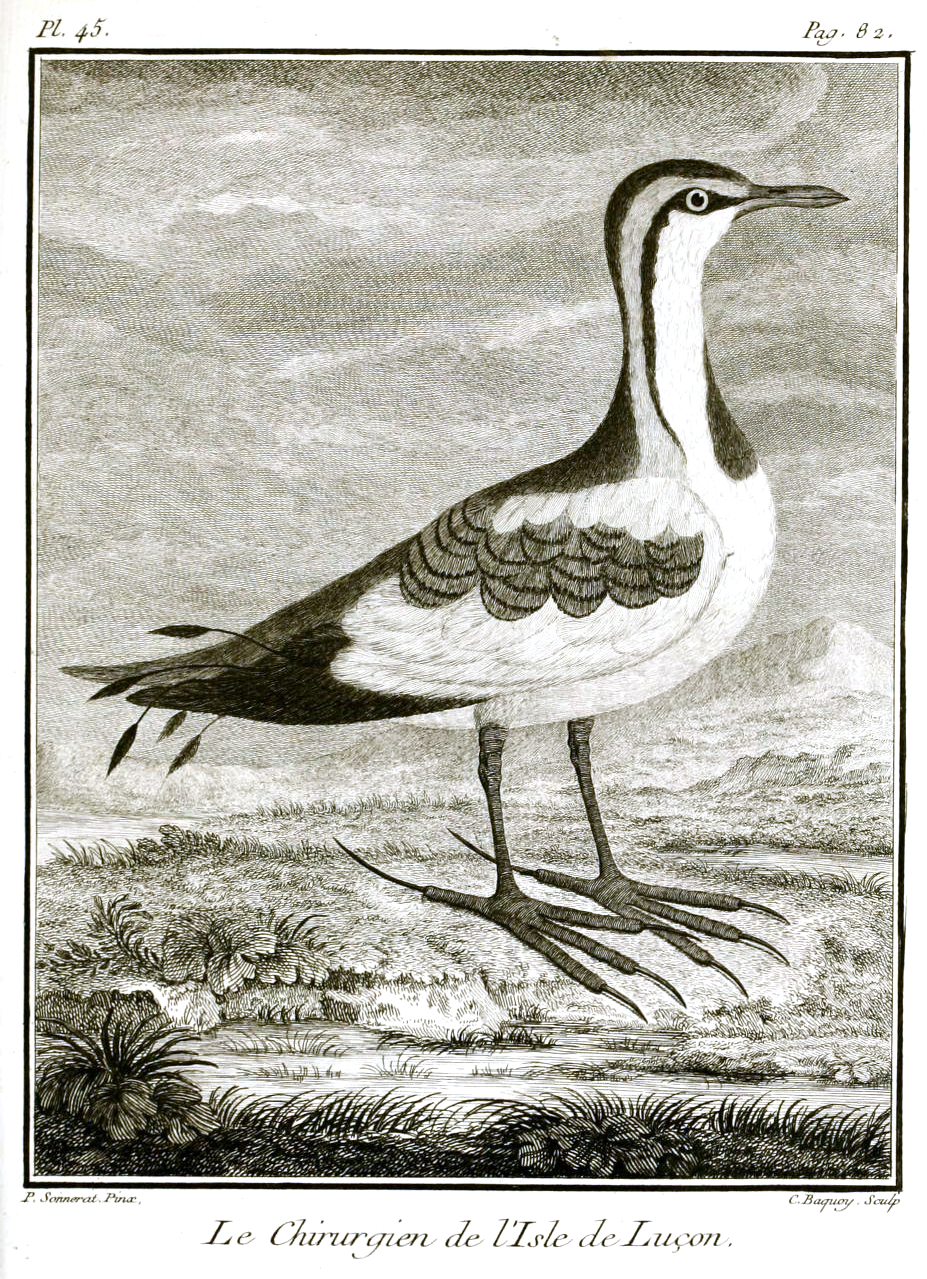
Sonnerat's "surgeon of the island of Luzon" (1776)

The pheasant-tailed jacana was described by the French explorer Pierre Sonnerat in his 1776 Voyage à la Nouvelle Guinée, in which he included an illustration of the bird that he called "Le Chirurgien de l'Isle de Luzon" or the surgeon of the island of Luzon. He described a bird with the long toes and the elongated feather extensions resembling the lancets used for blood-letting by surgeons of the period. Based on this description, the bird was given a binomial by Giovanni Scopoli in 1787 in his Deliciae Florae et Faunae Insubricae (Pars II), where he placed it in the genus Tringa. He retained the name chirurgus for the specific name. It was later placed in the genus Parra (under the junior synonym Parra luzonensis) along with other jacanas, and later still, the genera within the jacana family (then called Parridae) were separated.

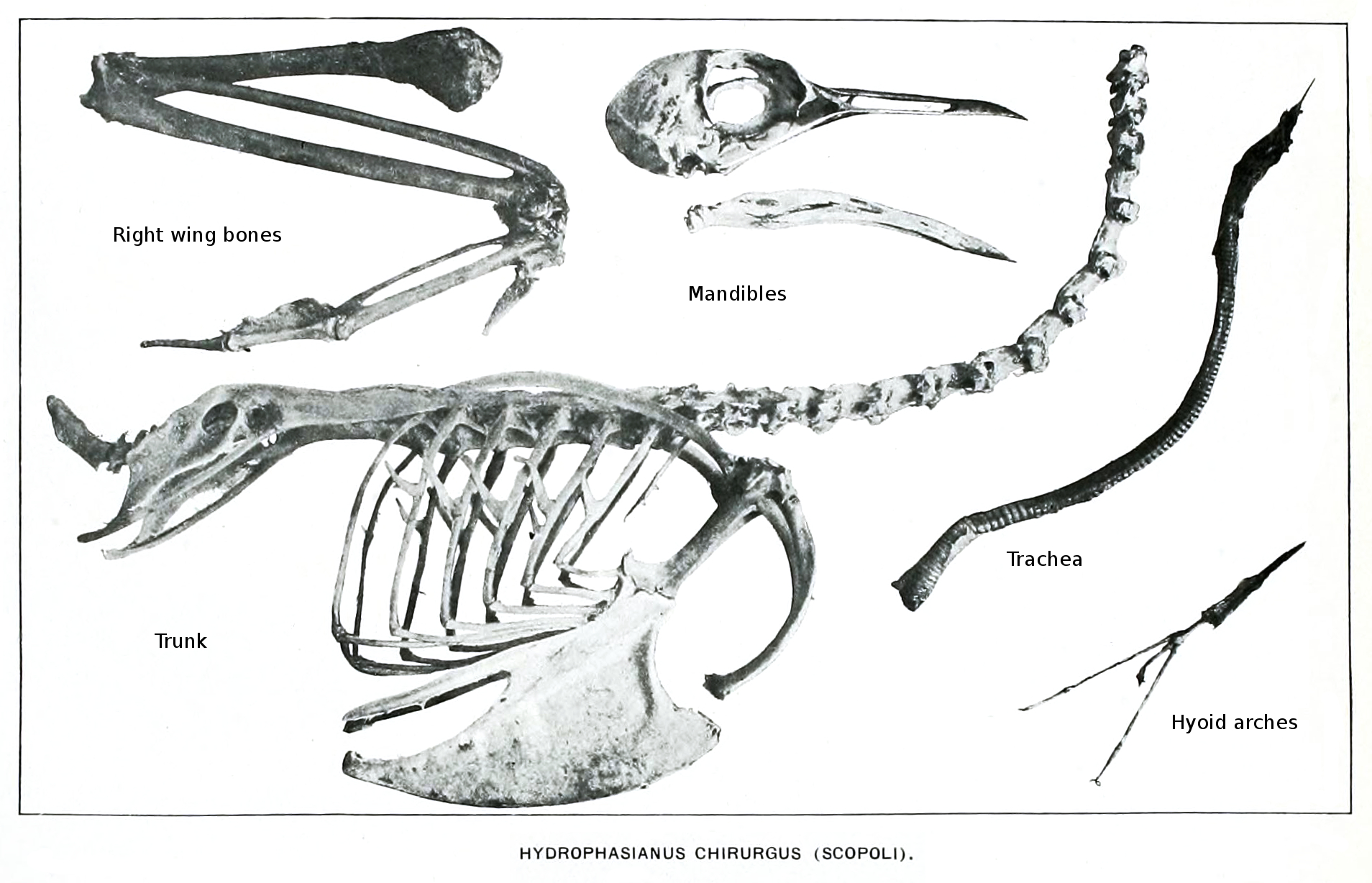
Skeleton of a female, showing the spur on the wing, pneumatization of the base of upper mandible, and trunk with sternum, trachea and hyoid

The genus Hydrophasianus, meaning "water pheasant", was erected by Johann Georg Wagler in 1832 as the species was distinctive in having a slender bill, lacking any frontal lappet, having a shorter hind claw than Metopidius, bearing on the outer two primaries lanceolate elongations, and having a pointed fourth primary. The distinct breeding and non-breeding plumage is unique within the jacanas.

=== Measurements ===
The following are standard measurements from a study based on living specimens during the breeding season in Thailand. They are averaged from 17 males and 4 females. A few measurements are from Rasmussen and Anderton (2005), where the head measurement (range given rather than mean) is from the tip of the bill to the back of the skull.

Measurements
	Male	Female
mass (g)	129.2	140.7
bill (cm)	2.89	3.12
wing (cm)	24.76	25.83
tarsus (cm)	5.72	6.33
tail (cm)	25.75	28.34
head (cm)	5.3-5.5	5.8-6.3
length (cm)	45.91	50.27

Body mass measurements can vary widely based on physiological conditions and are generally not used for taxonomic purposes. A dataset from the Philippines gives the body mass ranges as 120–140 g (4.2–4.9 oz) in males and 190–200 g (6.7–7.1 oz) in females.

== Distribution and habitat ==
The pheasant-tailed jacana is a resident breeder in tropical India, Southeast Asia, and Indonesia; it overlaps greatly in range with the bronze-winged jacana, but, unlike the bronze-winged jacana, is found in Sri Lanka. It is found on small to large lakes having sufficient floating vegetation. It is sedentary in much of its range, but northern breeders from south China and the Himalayas migrate south from their breeding ranges to Southeast Asia and peninsular India, respectively. In Nanking, the birds leave in November and return for summer in the third week of April. Some birds arrive in the non-breeding plumage. The species is resident in Taiwan, where it is considered endangered. Birds disperse in summer and have been recorded as vagrants in Socotra, Qatar, Australia and southern Japan (mainly Okinawa, Yonaguni, Ishigaki and Iriomote). The species tends to be commoner in lower elevations but climbs into the Himalayas in summer, and records exist of the species from altitudes of 3650 m in Kashmir (Vishansar Lake) and 3800 m in Lahul.

== Behaviour and ecology ==
The pheasant-tailed jacana's main sources of food are insects, molluscs, and other invertebrates picked from floating vegetation or the water's surface. It forages by walking on vegetation and also by swimming in water, somewhat like phalaropes (although Hoffmann claims that they wade in deeper water but never swim). It also ingests filamentous algae, seeds and plant material, but this may be purely accidental. Flocks of as many as 50 to 100 can be found on a body of water, and they can become tame and habituated to human presence. They usually fly low over the water surface but may also mob raptors higher in the air. On landing, they keep their wings open until they find firm footing.

The typical call is a mewing me-onp or a nasal teeun among winter flocks. Males and females have different calls during the breeding season, and several contextual variants exist. Young birds produce a low cheep with the bill closed.

=== Breeding ===
This jacana breeds on floating vegetation during the rainy season. In southern India, it breeds in the monsoon season, June–September. It is polyandrous; one female may lay up to ten clutches in a single season that are raised by different males. Female court males with flight displays around the males and with calling. The female builds a nest on floating vegetation made of leaves and stalks of plants with a depression in the centre. A single clutch consists of four glossy black-marked dark-olive-brown eggs (occasionally an egg in a clutch may be an odd pale sea-green in colour) which are laid in the mornings at 24 hour intervals. When an egg is removed at the one- or two-egg stage, the nest is torn down and a new one built, whereas a removal at the three-egg stage does not result in replacement. Once the clutch of four is laid, the male begins incubation and the female leaves to court a different male. In a study in Thailand it was found that it took a female 17 to 21 days to lay the next clutch. A study in China found females taking 9–12 days and laying nearly 7 to 10 clutches in a season. Males may move or drag eggs around by holding them between the bill and breast or between the wings and body. They may also push and float the eggs over water and onto nearby vegetation platforms when disturbed. Nests may be moved to distances of about 15 metres. Males near the nest may perform broken-wing and rodent-run displays to distract predators. The eggs are incubated for 26 to 28 days. During the first few days of incubation, the female defends the nest, chasing other waterbirds that may approach too close by flying at them. In close territorial combat they lock bills and strike simultaneously with both wings. Males actively forage in the morning and afternoon and tend to sit at the nest during the hottest part of the day. The downy nidifugous chicks freeze when threatened or when the male indicates alarm and may lie partly submerged with just the bill out of water.

Eggs may be preyed on by pond herons, while chicks may bet taken by birds of prey such as black-winged kites. The trematode parasite Renicola philippinensis was described from the kidney of a pheasant-tailed jacana in the New York Zoological Garden while Cycloceolum brasilianum was recorded in India. The bird louse species Rallicola sulcatus has been described from this species; it looks very similar to Rallicola indicus from the bronze-winged jacana. Another bird louse known from the species is Pseudomenopon pilosum.

== In culture ==
The pheasant-tailed jacana is commonly distributed in lily ponds in Sri Lanka and on account of its mewing call is known as the "cat teal" or juana in Sinhalese. In Cachar district of Assam, it is known by the name rani didao gophita, which translates to "little white water princess".
