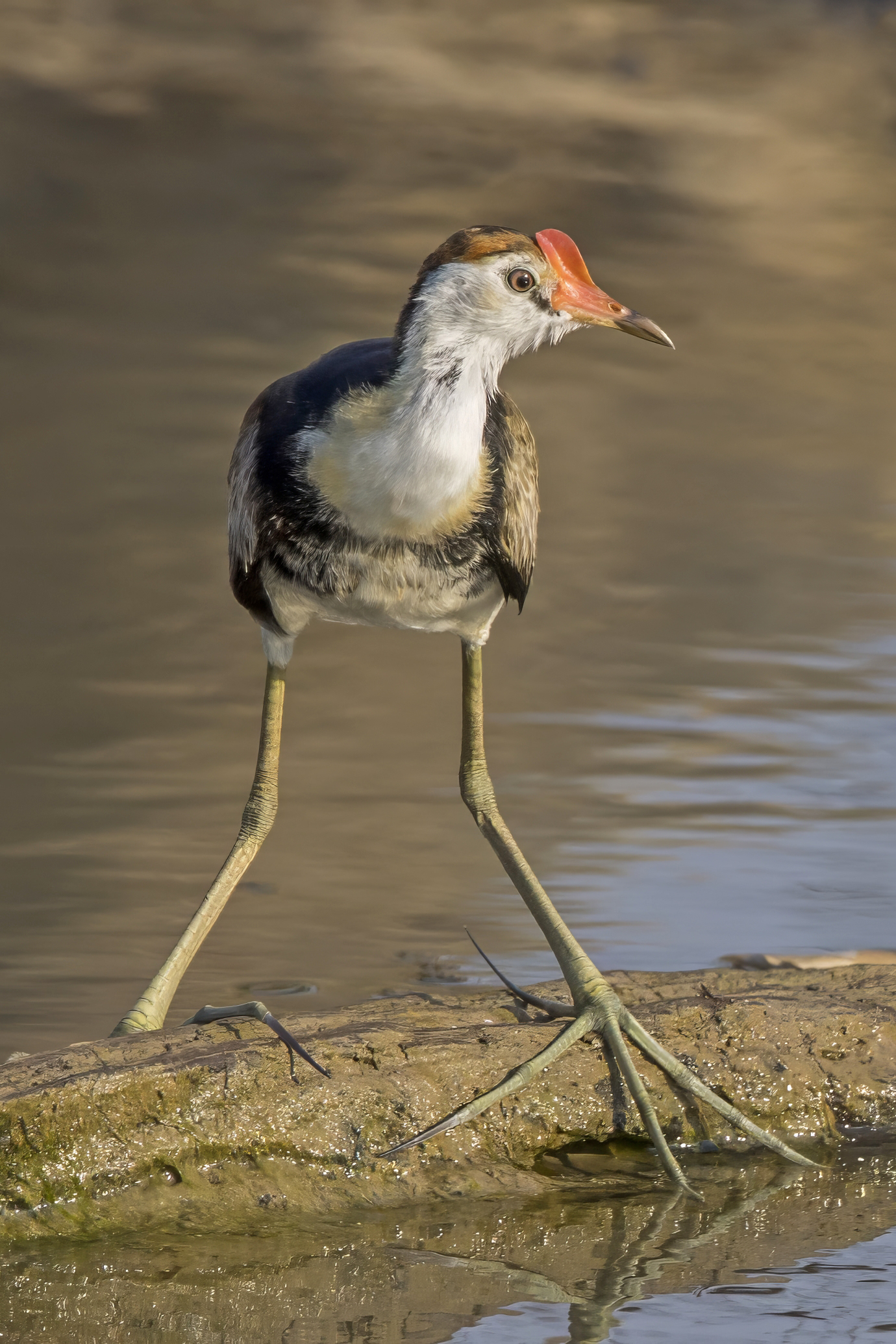

Conservation status
- Least Concern (IUCN 3.1)

Scientific classification
- Kingdom: Animalia
- Phylum: Chordata
- Class: Aves
- Order: Charadriiformes
- Family: Jacanidae
- Genus: Irediparra; Mathews, 1911
- Species: I. gallinacea

Binomial name
- Irediparra gallinacea (Temminck, 1828)

= Comb-crested jacana =

Species of bird

The comb-crested jacana (Irediparra gallinacea), also known as the lotusbird or lilytrotter (though these names are sometimes used to describe Jacanidae as a whole), is the only species of jacana in the genus Irediparra. Like other jacana species, it is adapted to the floating vegetation of tropical freshwater wetlands.

== Description ==
The comb-crested jacana has a black crown and hindneck with a fleshy red wattle covering the forehead and forecrown, contrasting with a white face and throat. The comb is pinker in breeding adults, more orange when not breeding. There is a broad black band on the lower breast with white belly. The underwing and flight feathers, which show most prominently in flight, are black. Back and upperwing mainly grey-brown with black primary coverts, rump and tail. The long legs with extremely long toes trail in flight. The male is slightly smaller than the female and measures 20–22 cm (7.9–8.7 in) in length and weighs 68–84 g (2.4–3.0 oz). The female measures 24–27 cm (9.4–10.6 in) in length and weighs 120–150 g (4.2–5.3 oz). The wingspan ranges from 39 to 46 cm (15 to 18 in).

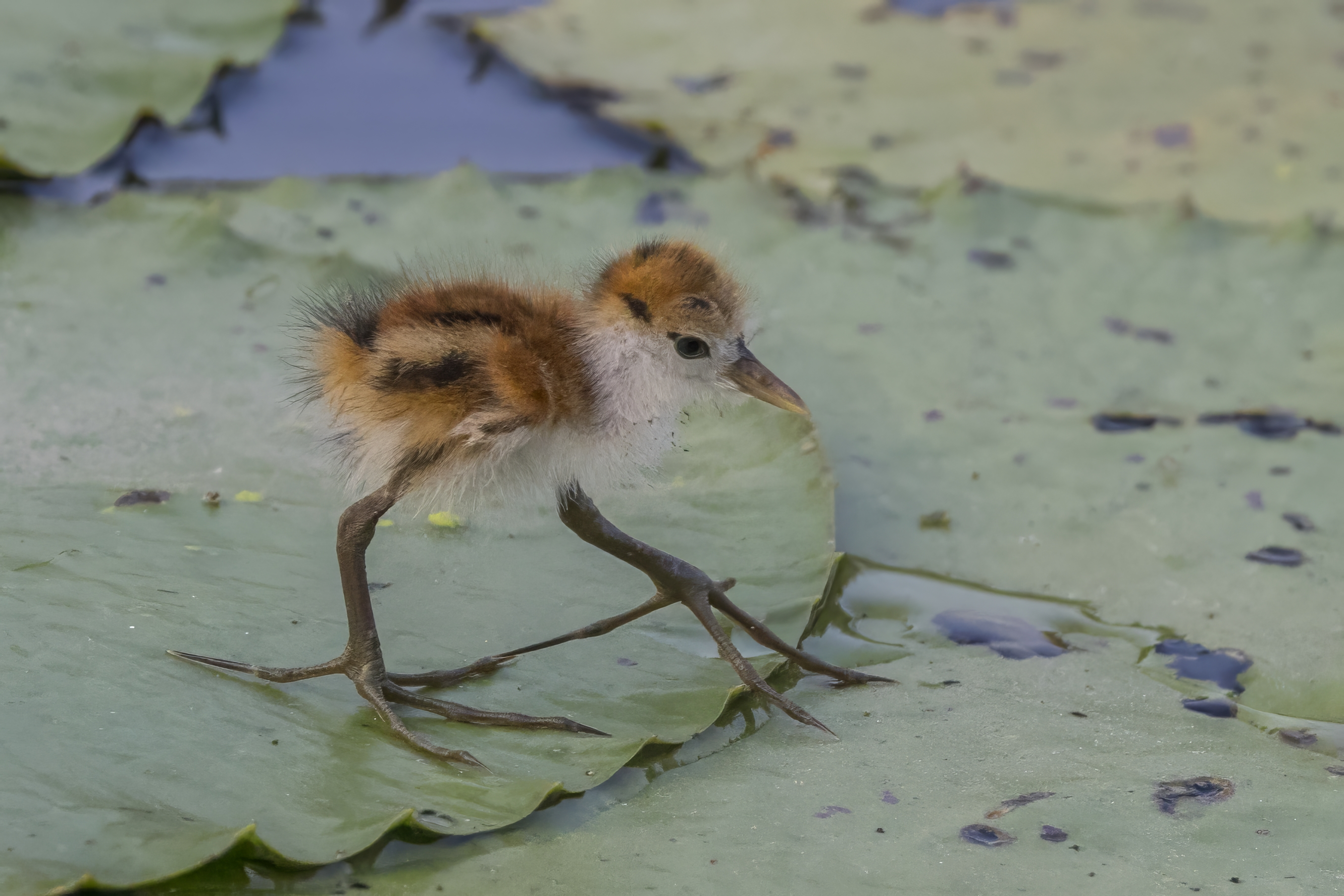
Chick

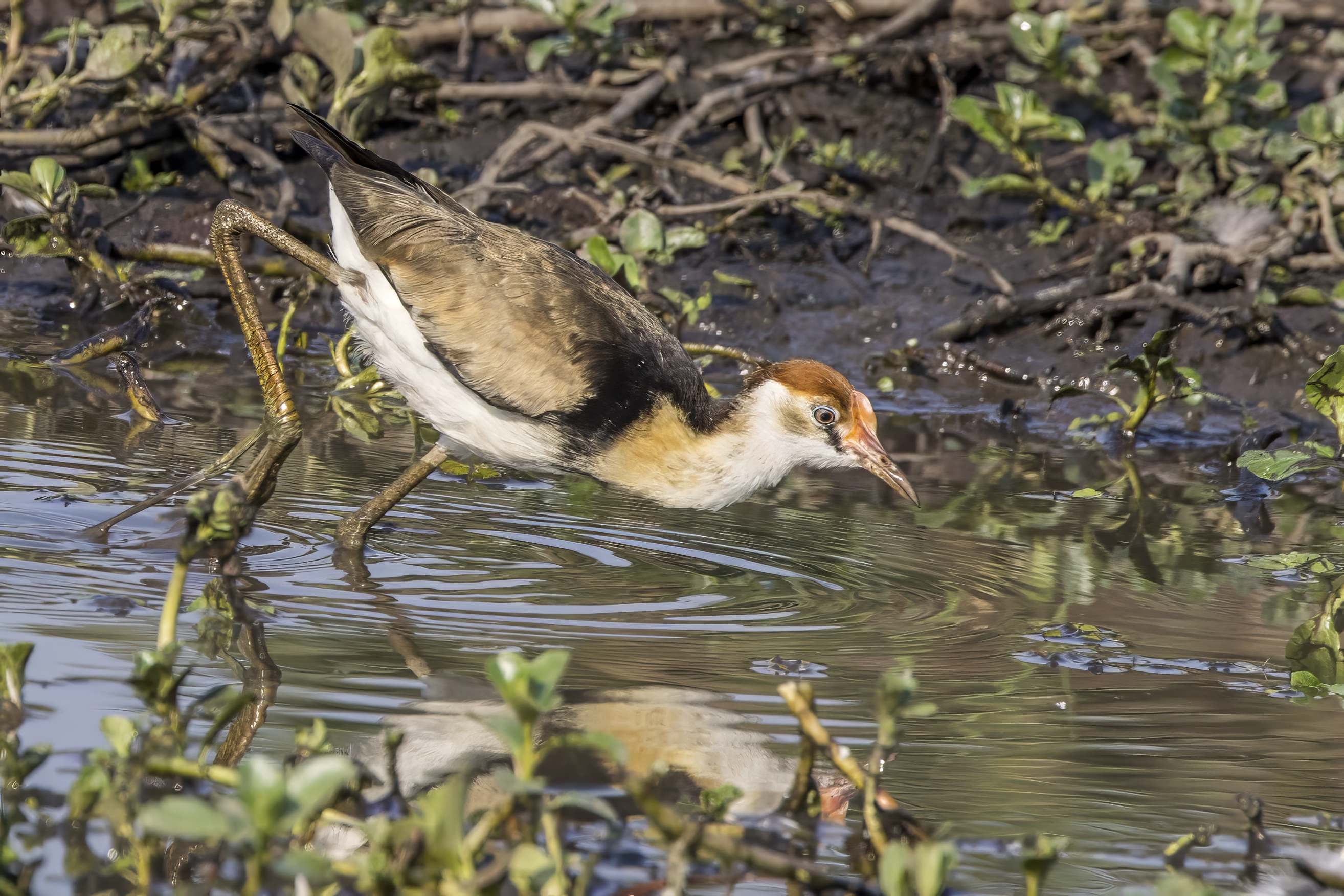
Juvenile

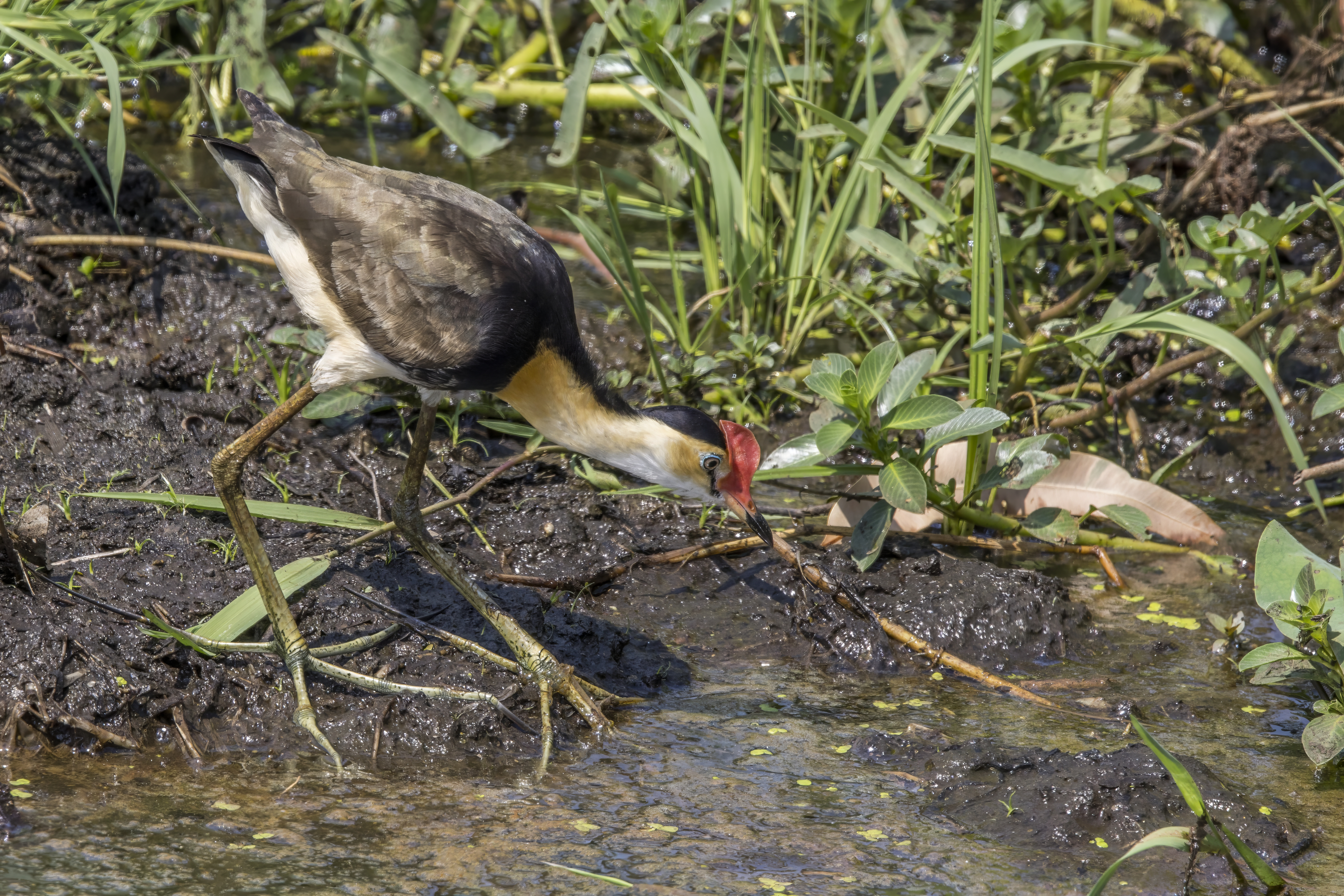
Adult

== Distribution and habitat ==
The bird occurs in south-eastern Borneo, the southern Philippines, Sulawesi, Moluccas, Lesser Sunda Islands, north and south-east New Guinea, New Britain (Lake Lalili), and northern and eastern Australia. Its habitat are large freshwater wetlands, swamps and lakes with abundant floating vegetation, such as water-lilies or water hyacinth, forming a mat on the water surface which it is able to walk on. Although the species is rare and localised it is not globally threatened.

== Behaviour ==
=== General behaviour ===
The comb-crested jacana walks slowly and deliberately. It often congregates in flocks. When disturbed, it flies low over water and lands again on open vegetation.

=== Breeding ===
The comb-crested jacana is polyandrous. It builds a flimsy nest on floating or emergent vegetation, in which the female lays four lustrous, pale brown eggs covered by black markings. Only males incubate. The young hatch well-developed and soon leave the nest.

=== Feeding ===
It eats seeds and aquatic insects gleaned from floating vegetation on the water surface.

=== Voice ===
This species gives a squeaky, high-pitched chittering, also described as a shrill trill with an explosive soft bugle.
